= List of paleoethnobotanists =

The following is a list of paleoethnobotanists.

- Amy Bogaard
- Camilla Dickson
- Gayle J. Fritz
- Dorian Fuller
- Kristina M. Gill
- Christine A. Hastorf
- Andreas G. Heiss
- Hans Helbaek
- Gordon Hillman
- Maria Hopf
- Stefanie Jacomet
- Glynis Jones
- Mordechai Kislev
- Udelgard Körber-Grohne
- Gyoung-Ah Lee
- Naomi F. Miller
- Paul Minnis
- Klaus Oeggl
- Deborah M. Pearsall
- Dolores Piperno
- Jane Renfrew
- Irwin Rovner
- Bruce Smith
- Marijke van der Veen
- Amber vanDerWarker
- Willem van Zeist
- George Willcox
- Ulrich Willerding
- Douglas E. Yen
- Daniel Zohary

== See also ==
- List of plant scientists
- Paleoethnobotany
