= Kristen Gremillion =

American anthropologist

Kristen Johnson Gremillion (born November 17, 1958) is an American anthropologist whose areas of specialization include paleoethnobotany, origins of agriculture, the prehistory of eastern North America, human paleoecology and paleodiet, and the evolutionary theory. Currently a professor in the Department of Anthropology at the Ohio State University and editor of the Journal of Ethnobiology, she has published many journal articles on these subjects.

== Personal life ==
Gremillion was born in Detroit, Michigan, but her family moved to New Orleans when she was still very young. She grew up in New Orleans and only left in 1982 when she went to attend graduate school at the University of North Carolina at Chapel Hill.

== Education ==
Gremillion began her college education at Vassar College in Poughkeepsie, New York, in 1976, majoring in anthropology. In 1979, she transferred to the University of New Orleans in Louisiana, where she graduated cum laude in 1980, receiving a B.A. in anthropology. In 1985, Gremillion received an M.A. in anthropology from the University of North Carolina, Chapel Hill, writing her thesis on Aboriginal Use of Plant Foods and European Contact in the North Carolina Piedmont. In 1989, she received her Ph.D. in anthropology, also from the University of North Carolina, Chapel Hill; her dissertation title was "Late Prehistoric and Historic Period Paleoethnobotany of the North Carolina Piedmont".

While in the process of completing her M.A. and Ph.D. in anthropology, Gremillion was self-employed as an archaeobotanical consultant. After completing her degrees, in 1990 she became a visiting lecturer for East Carolina University's Department of Sociology and Anthropology. From 1991 till 1997, Gremillion was an assistant professor at the Ohio State University in the Department of Anthropology. Then in 1997, she shifted from assistant professor to associate professor in the Department of Anthropology, where she continued to work. In 1999, Gremillion was granted an adjunct appointment in the Department of Evolution, Ecology, and Organismal Biology at the same university.

== Research ==
Gremillion has worked on research surrounding when and where the domestication of plants may have taken place in Eastern North America, focusing on the forager-farmers of the eastern Kentucky uplands. Her research suggests that experimentation in plant domestication may have started in the uplands, instead of the rich soiled flood plains as former theories have suggested. Gremillion suggests that domesticating plants in the uplands would have been more cost-effective than the flood plains because these people lived in the uplands and would be able to experiment with domestication without having to travel great distances to get to the fertile flood plains.

== Field work ==
In 1992 she was the project director and field supervisor for excavations at Rock Bridge shelter in Wolfe Co., KY.

Her other field work after this includes:

- Project director and field supervisor for an excavation at the Cold Oak Shelter in Lee Co., KY (1994)
- Project director of an archaeological survey in Lee Co., KY (1995)
- Project director for excavations at Mounded Talus shelter in Lee Co., KY (1996)
- Project director and field supervisor for excavations at Courthouse Rock shelter (1998) in Powell Co., KY.
- Project director and field supervisor at Sheldon Skidmore site and Shepherd site (2000) in Powell Co, KY
- Project director and field supervisor at the Anderson and Martin site (2001) in Powell Co., KY

== Publications ==
Gremillion's publications have centered on food production, crops, and dietary analysis of societies in the archaeological record.

- 2011 Ancestral Appetites: Food in Prehistory (Cambridge University Press, 2011). ISBN 9780521727075

=== Journal articles ===
- 2005 (Joe W. Saunders, Charles M. Allen, E. Thurman Allen, Daniel A. Bush, James K. Feathers, Kristen J. Gremillion, C. T. Hallmark, Edwin H. Jackson, Jay K. Johnson, Reca Jones, Rolfe D. Mandel, C. Garth Sampson, Roger T. Saucier, Gary L. Stringer, and Malcolm F. Vidrine). Watson Brake, A Middle Archaic Mound Complex in Northeast Louisiana. American Antiquity 70: 631–668.
- 2004 Seed Processing and the Origins of Food Production in Eastern North America. American Antiquity 69: 215–234.
- 2002 Foraging Theory and Hypothesis Testing in Archaeology: An Exploration of Methodological Problems and Solutions. Journal of Anthropological Archaeology 21: 142–164.
- 2002 Archaeobotany at Old Mobile. Historical Archaeology 21: 142–164.
- 1998 Changing Roles of Wild and Cultivated Plant Resources Among Early Farmers of Eastern Kentucky. Southeastern Archaeology 17: 140–157.
- 1998 (Paul Delcourt, Hazel Delcourt, Cecil Ison, William Sharp, and Kristen J. Gremillion). Prehistoric Human Use of Fire, the Eastern Agricultural Complex, and Appalachian Oak-Chestnut Forests: Paleoecology of Cliff Palace Pond, Kentucky. American Antiquity 63: 263–278.
- 1997 (Joe W. Saunders, Rolfe D. Mandel, Roger T. Saucier, E. Thurman Allen, C. T. Hallmark, Jay K. Johnson, Edwin H. Jackson, Charles M. Allen, Gary L. Stringer, Douglas S. Frink, James K. Feathers, Stephen Williams, Kristen J. Gremillion, Malcolm F. Vidrine, and Reca Jones). A 5400-5000 B.P. Mound Complex in Louisiana. Science 277:1796-1799.
- 1996 (Kristin D. Sobolik, Kristen J. Gremillion, Patricia Whitten, and Patty Jo Watson). Technical Note: Sex Determination and Dietary Analysis of Prehistoric Human Paleofeces. American Journal of Physical Anthropology 101:283-290.
- 1996 Diffusion and Adoption of Crops in Evolutionary Perspective. Journal of Anthropological Archaeology 15: 183–204.
- 1996 Early Agricultural Diet in Eastern North America: Evidence from Two Kentucky Rockshelters. American Antiquity 61: 520–536.
- 1996 Kristen J. Gremillion and Kristin D. Sobolik). Dietary Variability among Prehistoric Forager-Farmers of Eastern North America. Current Anthropology 37: 529–539.
- 1995 Comparative Paleoethnobotany of Three Native Southeastern Communities of the Historic Period. Southeastern Archaeology 14: 1–16.
- 1993 Prehistoric Maize from Bottle Creek. Journal of Alabama Archaeology 39: 133–150.
- 1993 The Evolution of Seed Morphology in Domesticated Chenopodium: An Archaeological Case Study. Journal of Ethnobiology 13: 149–169.
- 1993 Plant Husbandry at the Archaic/Woodland Transition: Evidence from the Cold Oak Shelter, Kentucky. Midcontinental Journal of Archaeology 18: 161–189.
- 1993 Crop and Weed in Prehistoric Eastern North America: The Chenopodium Example. American Antiquity 58: 496–509.
- 1993 Adoption of Old World Crops and Processes of Cultural Change in the Historic Southeast. Southeastern Archaeology 12: 15–20.
- 1989 The Development of a Mutualistic Relationship Between Humans and Maypops (Passiflora incarnata L.) in the Southeastern United States. Journal of Ethnobiology 9: 135–155.
