= Gayle J. Fritz =

American paleoethnobotanist

Gayle J. Fritz is an American paleoethnobotanist working out of Washington University in St. Louis. She is a world expert on ancient crops. Fritz runs the Paleoethnobotany Lab at Washington University in St. Louis under the auspices of the Anthropology Department.

== Biography ==
Fritz received her M.A at the University of Texas at Austin, 1975. She received her Ph.D. at the University of North Carolina at Chapel Hill in 1986.

Her work focuses on crops other than maize, such as chenopodium and amaranth, and emphasizes the importance of direct radiocarbon dating when establishing the models of early agriculture. She also proposes a diversity of pathways from hunting-gathering to agriculture, highly dependent on regional variations and the intricacies of local cultures, and explores the role of women in early societies, often challenging a "Big Chief" model of hierarchical dominance. Her research interests include grain amaranth, chenopod, maygrass, tobacco, and hickory nuts.

== Selected works ==
- Browman, D. L., Fritz, G. J., and Watson, P. J.: "Origins of Food-Producing Economies in the Americas." In The Human Past, edited by Christopher Scarre (2005), pp. 306–349. Thames and Hudson, London.
- Fritz, G. J.: "Paleoethnobotanical Methods and Applications." In Handbook of Archaeological Methods, edited by Herbert D. G. Maschner and Christopher Chippindale (2005), pp. 771–832. Altamira Press, Walnut Creek, California.
- Fritz, G. J. and Lopinot, N. H.: "Native Crops at Early Cahokia: Comparing Domestic and Ceremonial Contexts". Illinois Archaeology 14, in press.
