= Horses Grazing Site =

Horses Grazing, located in Moore County, North Carolina, is a sandy ridge that goes into wetlands in Little Crane Creek, and was inhabited throughout the Archaic and Woodland periods. An excavation in 2001 by Joel D. Gunn and Irwin Rovner yielded about 20,000 artifacts, a vast majority of which were quartz chippings from a downstream quarry. The distribution of the findings showed that the ridge was most likely the more settled part of the area.

== Site description ==
The site is a sandy ridge to the east of US Highway 1, near Little Crane Creek, which is a tributary of the Little River. Underneath the sand is a clay rich layer, which also supports a water table. The water comes out at the lower end of the ridge, but the higher end is dry, which would have been ideal for inhabitants. There is also a slope at the northern edge of the site, near the spring.

The top of the ridge or the northward slope are the places where inhabitants most likely lived. Both of these areas have a slope of about 2 to 4 degrees, which is typically ideal for inhabitation because it prevents water from building up in an area. The southern slope was likely not settled because it would have been exposed to more wind, as evidenced by a blowout. A quartz quarry is downstream.

Local Native Americans believe that a game migration trail passed through the Horses Grazing site. This could help account for the variation in the style and time period of the artifacts that were found.

== Excavation ==
Preliminary shovel tests in 1991 and again in 1995 did not yield many results, so the site was not considered promising for archaeologists to examine. Another excavation was started in 2001 by Joel D. Gunn and Irwin Rovner because a highway was going to be built near the site. This excavation yielded some ceramics, which were dated to the Early Archaic and Woodland periods. A reason that this site was difficult to find could be because Robert Benson found that the density of a site declines further north from Georgia, which makes the sites harder to locate.

The artifacts found were very patchily distributed. Seven 5x5 meter blocks were excavated, and while one only yielded 4 artifacts, another area held as many as 2,500 within a 2 meter diameter. Three of these blocks were by the ridge, and four were near the northern slope.

== Findings ==
The 2001 excavation recovered around 20,000 artifacts. This included about 50 projectile points. Fish and turtle remains were found on the ridge, which helps confirm that there were wetlands there.

78% of the artifacts found were quartz chippings, and there was a quartz quarry a few hundred yards downstream from the site. 115 ceramic pieces were found, mostly in the upper half of the area that was excavated. Below this was

Paleoindian tools were uniformly spread throughout the site, but very sparingly. This included scrapers, burins, gravers, and blades. A majority of the points found at the site were carefully sharpened, which means they were likely used as projectile points. These were likely used to kill game, brought back to the site inside the game, then discarded when they were found while eating it. A much smaller number of the points were dull, which are the ones that were vigorously used as knives. A large number of carefully crafted Rowan points were found with each other, which may have been cached by inhabitants to come back to later.

Around 10,000 of the artifacts were found on the ridge, and another 7,000 were found on the platform.
