= E. N. Anderson =

Professor of anthropology, born 1941

Eugene Newton Anderson (born 1941) is a professor of anthropology emeritus at the University of California, Riverside.

== Career ==
Anderson received a B.A. in anthropology from Harvard College in 1962 and a Ph.D. in anthropology from the University of California, Berkeley in 1967. He taught at Riverside from 1966 to 2006, when he became emeritus. He has worked on cultural anthropology, cultural ecology, ethnobiology, and food and nutrition in China, Pacific Northwest, and the Yucatán (Yucatec Maya).

He was President of the Society of Ethnobiology from 2007 to 2009 and received the Distinguished Ethnobiologist Award from it in 2013 for his "outstanding contributions" to the field. He has been a member of the editorial board of the Journal of Ethnobiology, Human Ecology, and the Journal of Ecological Anthropology.

He has done field work in Hong Kong, Malaysia, British Columbia, and Quintana Roo.

== Select bibliography ==
- E.N. Anderson. 1988. The Food of China, Yale University Press
- E.N. Anderson. 2003. Those Who Bring the Flowers. Chetumal, Q. Roo, Mexico: ECOSUR.
- B.B. Faust, E.N. Anderson and J. Frazier (eds.). 2004. Rights, Resources, Culture and Conservation in the Land of the Maya, Praeger
- E.N. Anderson. 2005, 2014.Everyone Eats, New York University Press
- E.N. Anderson and Felix Medina. 2005 Tzuc: Animals and the Maya in Southeast Mexico, Tucson: University of Arizona Press
- E.N. Anderson. 2005. Political Ecology in a Yucatec Maya Community, University of Arizona Press
- Christopher Chase-Dunn and E.N. Anderson (eds.). 2005 The Historical Evolution of World-Systems. Palgrave MacMillan
- E.N. Anderson. 2007. Floating World Lost, University Press of the South
- E.N. Anderson. 2008. Mayaland Cuisine, Lulu Publishing (online)
- E.N. Anderson. 2010. The Pursuit of Ecotopia: Lessons from Indigenous and Traditional Societies for the Human Ecology of Our Modern World, Praeger
- B.A. Anderson and E.N. Anderson. 2012. Warning Signs of Genocide, Lexington Books
- E.N. Anderson. 2014. Caring for Place, Left Coast Press
- E.N. Anderson. 2014. Food and Environment in Early and Medieval China, University of Pennsylvania Press
- M.Q. Sutton and E.N. Anderson. 2014. Introduction to Cultural Ecology, Altamira Press (3rd ed.)
- A. O'Connor and E.N. Anderson. 2017. K'oben: 3000 Years of the Maya Hearth, Routledge
- E.N. Anderson. 2019. The East Asian World-System: Climate and Dynastic Change, Springer
- Buell, P.D., E.N. Anderson, de Pablo, M. and M. Oskenbay. 2020. Crossroads of Cuisine: The Eurasian Heartland, the Silk Roads, and Foods. Brill
- E.N. Anderson & B.A. Anderson. 2020.Complying with Genocide: The Wolf You Feed. Rowman and Littlefield
- Buell, P. D. and E. N. Anderson. 2021. Arabic Medicine in China: Tradition, Innovation, and Change. Brill

== Honors ==
- 2013, Society of Ethnobiology, Distinguished Ethnobiologist Award
- 1986, American Anthropology Association, Lifetime Member
- 1981, American Association for the Advancement of Science, Fellow
