= Stefanie Jacomet =

Stefanie Jacomet (born 1952) is professor of archaeobotany at Basel University. Her research focuses on investigating wetland sites in Central Europe and developing archaeobotanical methodologies.

== Biography ==
Jacomet was born in 1952. She studied botany at Basel, receiving a PhD in 1979 on the subject of plant remains from Neolithic lakeshore settlements in Zurich.

During the 1980s Jacomet received a postdoctoral scholarship from the Swiss National Foundation for Scientific Research. Jacomet was a member of the scientific supervisory board of the Lower Saxony Institute for Historical Coastal Research from 1996 to 2009. In 1986 Jacomet was appointed lecturer for botany and archaeobotany at Basel University.

Jacomet has edited several special issues of Vegetation History and Archaeobotany. She is a member of the German Archaeological Institute, and previously associate editor of Vegetation History and Archaeobotany. Jacomet is a collaborator on the ongoing ERC funded PLANTCULT Project.

== Selected publications ==
- Jacomet, Stefanie & Kreuz, Angela. 1999. Archäobotanik. Aufgaben, Methoden und Ergebnisse vegetations- und agrargeschichtlicher Forschung. Ulmer, Stuttgart. 368 pages. ISBN 3-8252-8158-2
- Jacomet, Stefanie; Kucan, Dusanka; Ritter, Axel; Suter, Georg; Hagendorn, Andrea (2002) Punica granatum (pomegranates) from early Roman contexts in Vindonissa (Switzerland). Vegetation History and Archaeobotany 11, 1–2, 79–92.
- Bakels, C. and Jacomet, S. 2003. Access to luxury foods in Central Europe during the Roman period: the archaeobotanical evidence. World Archaeology.
- Jacomet, S. 2006. Plant economy of the northern Alpine lake dwellings—3500–2400 cal. BC. Environmental Archaeology.
- Jacomet, S. 2006. Identification of cereal remains from archaeological sites. Basel University.
- Jacomet, S. 2007. Neolithic plant economies in the northern Alpine Foreland from 5500-3500 cal BC. In The Origins and Spread of Domestic Plants in Southwest Asia and Europe, edited by S. Colledge and J. Connolly.
- Jacomet, Stefanie. 2009. Plant economy and village life in Neolithic lake dwellings at the time of the Alpine Iceman. Vegetation History and Archaeobotany 18/1, 47–59.
- Jacomet, S., Ebersbach, R., Akeret, Ö., Antolín, F., Baum, T., Bogaard, A., Brombacher, C., Bleicher, N. K., Heitz-Weniger, A., Hüster-Plogmann, H., Gross, E., Kühn, M., Rentzel, P., Steiner, B. L., Wick, L., Schibler, J. M. 2016. On-site data cast doubts on the hypothesis of shifting cultivation in the Late Neolithic (ca. 4300-2400 cal. BC). Landscape management as an alternative paradigm. The Holocene. DOI: 10.1177/0959683616645941.
