= Marijke van der Veen =

Dutch archaeobotanist

Marijke van der Veen FSA
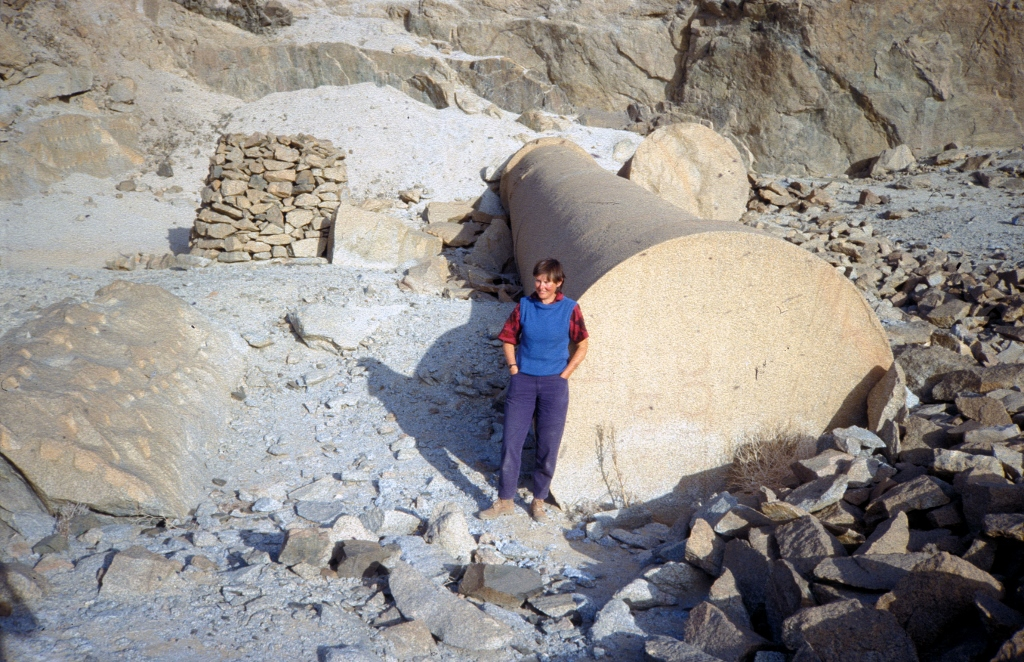
- van der Veen at one of the columns left at Mons Claudianus, Egypt

Academic background
- Education: University of Sheffield
- Thesis: Arable farming in north east England during the later prehistoric and Roman period: an archaeobotanical perspective (1991)

Academic work
- Discipline: Archaeology
- Sub-discipline: Archaeobotanist
- Institutions: University of Durham; University of Leicester

Marijke van der Veen, FSA is a Dutch archaeobotanist and Emeritus Professor of Archaeology at the University of Leicester.

== Biography ==
Van der Veen studied History and Archaeology at the University of Groningen. During this time she worked together with Jan Lanting on the Bronze Age barrow landscape, and their circular post settings, at the Hooghalen-estate in the Dutch province of Drenthe. At the University of Sheffield, she studied for a MA in Economic Archaeology and a PhD in Archaeobotany. Following her PhD, Van der Veen worked at Durham University as the English Heritage advisor for environmental archaeology in northern England. In 1992 Van der Veen joined the School of Archaeology and Ancient History, University of Leicester and was promoted to Professor in 2005.

Her research has focussed on the Iron Age and Roman periods in Britain, and Roman and Islamic periods in Egypt. Early work established statistical methodologies for archaeobotanical analysis, and pioneered the sampling of archaeological sites in northern Britain. This work demonstrated that Iron Age societies in northern England were undertaking cereal cultivation. More recently, Van der Veen has reconsidered the interpretation of the density of charred crop remains at Iron Age sites, and the comparison of modes of preservation. Van der Veen has studied the food supply to Roman quarry sites Mons Claudianus and Mons Porphyrites in the eastern desert of Egypt, which showed the wide range of foods grown and imported to these remote sites. A major archaeobotanical study of food remains from the port at Quseir al-Qadim, recovered from the 1999-2003 University of Southampton excavations, showed new insights to Roman and Islamic trade. Finds included garlic gloves, citrus rind, banana skins, and black pepper. Her study on Quseir al-Qadim has been described as showing "her ability to recount fascinating botanical investigations of the past in a stimulating and thorough way". Her recent work has focussed on the dispersal of imported plant foods, in Roman Britain, and the Indian Ocean spice trade.

Van der Veen received a Leverhulme Trust Major Research Fellowship (2008-2011), and a Research Fellowship at the Netherlands Institute for Advanced Studies (2011–12) for the project Seeds of Change.

Van der Veen has worked to advance archaeobotanical work in Africa, and has edited a proceedings of the International Workshop on African Archaeobotany and several issues of the journal World Archaeology. In 2002 Van der Veen was elected as a Fellow of the Society of Antiquaries.

== Selected publications ==
- 2014. Van der Veen, M. The materiality of plants: plant-people entanglements. World Archaeology 46(5): 799-812. doi:10.1080/00438243.2014.953710.
- 2011. Van der Veen, M. Consumption, Trade and Innovation: Exploring the Botanical Remains from the Roman and Islamic Ports at Quseir al-Qadim, Egypt. Frankfurt: Africa Magna Verlag.
- 2010. Van der Veen, M. Agricultural innovation: invention and adoption or change and adaptation? World Archaeology 42(1): 1-12. doi:10.1080/00438240903429649.
- 2008. Van der Veen, M. Food as embodied material culture – diversity and change in plant food consumption in Roman Britain. Journal of Roman Archaeology 21: 83-110.
- 2008. Livarda, A. and M. van der Veen "Social access and dispersal of condiments in North-West Europe from the Roman to the medieval period." Vegetation History and Archaeobotany 17(S1): 201-209.
- 2007. Van der Veen, M. "Formation processes of desiccated and carbonized plant remains-the identification of routine practice." Journal of Archaeological Science 34: 968-990.
- 2005. Van der Veen, M. Gardens and fields: the intensity and scale of food production. World Archaeology 37(2): 157-163. doi:10.1080/004382405000130731.
- 1998. Van der Veen, M. A life of luxury in the desert? The food and fodder supply to Mons Claudianus. Journal of Roman Archaeology 11: 101-116.
- 1992. Van der Veen, M. Crop Husbandry Regimes. An Archaeobotanical Study of Farming in Northern England: 1000 BC - AD 500. Sheffield, J. R. Collis Publications. ISBN 0906090415
- 1989. Van der Veen, M. and Lanting, J.N. "A group of tumuli on the 'Hooghalen' estate near Hijken (municipality of Beilen, province of Drenthe, the Netherlands)." Palaeohistoria 31: 191-234.
- 1982. Van der Veen, M. and Fieller, N. Sampling seeds. Journal of Archaeological Science 9: 287-298.
