= George Willcox =

George Willcox (born 1949) is an archaeobotanist who specialises in the origins of agriculture in the Near East. He has been employed as researcher with the CNRS (Centre national de la recherche scientifique) France since 1989. He has dual French and British nationality. He studied environmental archaeology under the late Prof. Dimbleby at the Institute of Archaeology in London during the early 1970s and was then employed as environmental archaeologist by the Museum of London. In 1977 he married and left his job to follow his interest in Near Eastern archaeobotany. An interest which he had acquired as an undergraduate working with Gordon Hillman in Turkey. During the next few years he worked in Turkey, Afghanistan Jordan, Oman, Kuwait, Tajikistan, India and Syria and started amassing a charred archaeobotanical collection and modern reference collection. These are now housed at the Muséum national d’Histoire naturelle in Paris. It was during this somewhat precarious period that he moved to France and founded a family. In 1984 Gordon Hillman introduced George to Jacques Cauvin and Patrica Anderson at the CNRS Institut de Préhistore Orientale in south east France where they developed a project on experimentally cultivating wild cereals In 1989 George entered the CNRS working on a number of early Neolithic sites in Syria in particular with Danielle Stordeur at Jerf el Amhar. He lectured at several French universities on archaeobotany and the origins of agriculture and supervised post graduate students. He was an associate editor for Vegetation History and Archaeobotany for many years and received an honorary doctorate from the University of Basel in 2013. His 117 scholarly publications are a measure of his research achievements. In 2014 with statutory retirement the CNRS awarded George the status of "Directeur de Recherche Emérite, CNRS" which allows him to continue to supervise students, sit on PhD panels, peer review manuscripts and carry out field work.

== Selected publications ==
- Willcox G. 2013 The Roots of Cultivation in Southwestern Asia. Science. Vol. 341 no. 6141 pp. 39–40.
- Tanno K. Willcox G. 2012 Distinguishing wild and domestic wheat and barley spikelets from early Holocene sites in the Near East. Vegetation History and Archaeobotany. Volume 21, Number 2, 107–115.
- Willcox G. 2012 Searching for the origins of arable weeds in the Near East. Vegetation History and Archaeobotany.Volume 21, Number 2, 163–167.
- Tanno K. Willcox G. 2006a How fast was wild wheat domesticated? Science 311: 1886.
- Willcox G., 1974 "A history of deforestation as indicated by charcoal analysis of four sites in eastern Anatolia" Anatolian Studies. Vol. XXIV 117–133.
