= Udelgard Körber-Grohne =

German archaeobotanist

Prof Udelgard Körber-Grohne

Academic work
- Sub-discipline: Archaeobotany
- Institutions: University of Hohenheim

Udelgard Körber-Grohne (July 11, 1923, in Hamburg – November 6, 2014, in Wiesensteig) was a German archaeobotanist.

== Early life and education ==
Körber-Grohne was born in Hamburg. Her father Ernst Grohne was an archaeologist and museum curator in Bremen. She studied biology at university, graduating from Braunschweig Technical University in 1948.

== Career ==
In 1949 she began work at the Lower Saxony State Institute for Marsh and Wound Research in Wilhelmshaven, where she studied archaeology and geology of the Lower Saxony coastal area. Her early work utilised pollen analysis to study vegetation history. Methodological advances included the identification of cereal pollen. She took over the archeobotanical analysis in the archaeological excavation project of the settlement Feddersen Wierde where she studied a large assemblage of waterlogged plant remains. This study was pioneering in the development of identification methods and the identification of past plant communities on the basis of archaeobotanical remains, the publication of which "set new standards for archaeobotany".

After a family break and the death of her husband Körber-Grohne moved in 1970 to the University of Hohenheim and worked at the local Botanical Institute under Burkhard Frenzel. In the following years she was involved in the field of archaeobotany in southern Germany. She habilitated with her research work on Feddersen Wierde and was appointed as a professor in 1970. During this period she worked on a range of archaeological projects in south-west Germany, including archaeobotanical remains from the Roman castellum of Welzheim, and from the grave of a Halstatt chief at Hochdorf. She developed methodologies for the identification of ancient textile fragments, including a study of Viking finds from Haithabu.

Körber-Grohne retired in 1988, after which she continued to produce academic research. A key study was on the history of cherries, damsons, plums and sloes.

Körber-Grohne was a member of the German Archaeological Institute.

== Honours ==
A festschrift was published in 1988 entitled Der prähistorische Mensch und seine Umwelt.

== Selected publications ==
- 1979. Nutzpflanzen und Umwelt im römischen Germanien. (Kleine Schriften zur Kenntnis der römischen Besetzungsgeschichte Südwestdeutschlands, Bd. 21) Stuttgart.
- 1987. Nutzpflanzen in Deutschland. Kulturgeschichte und Biologie. Theiss, Stuttgart.
- 1996. Pflaumen, Kirschpflaumen, Schlehen. Heutige Pflanzen und ihre Geschichte seit der Frühzeit. Theiss, Stuttgart.
- 1998. Geobotanische Untersuchungen auf der Feddersen Wierde. (Feddersen Wierde, Bd. 1), Steiner Franz Verlag.
