= Ulrich Willerding =

German botanist (1932–2021)

- Born: 8 July 1932; Querfurt, Germany
- Died: 20 December 2021 (aged 89); Göttingen, Lower Saxony, Germany
- Occupation: professor of botany

Ulrich Willerding (8 July 1932 – 20 December 2021) was a professor of botany at the Göttingen University, Germany. He was also an instructor at a local high school.

== Biography ==
Willerding was one of the leading European palaeo-ethnobotanists. He had specialized in Medieval Europe but also done work on other times. One of his special interests was weeds. He had worked on bibliographies of European paleoethnobotany. Although a biologist by training, he had worked extensively with archaeologists.

== Selected publications ==
- "Göttingen: II. Die Pflanzenreste aus der bandkeramischen Siedlung," NAFN II, 1965.
- "Mittelalterliche Pflanzenreste von der Büraburg," in Burg – „Oppidum“ – Bischofssitz in karolingischer Zeit ed. by Norbert Wand, 1974.
- Die Paläoethnobotanik und ihre Stellung im System der Wissenschaften (Berichte der Deutschen Botanischen Gesellschaft), 1978.
- (Co-editor) Beiträge zur Paläo- Ethnobotanik von Europa. Contributions to the Palaeo- Ethnobotany of Europe, 1978.
- Zur Geschichte der Unkräuter Mitteleuropas, 1986.
- "Landnutzung und Ernährung,“ in: Göttingen: Geschichte einer Universitätsstadt Band 1: Von den Anfängen bis zum Ende des Dreißigjährigen Krieges / Dietrich Denecke, Helga-Maria Kühn (Hrsg.), 1987.
- Frühmittelalterliche Gärten (Archäologische Mitteilungen aus Nordwestdeutschland), 1996.
- "Zur Verwendung von Pflanzen im Hausbau des Mittelalters und während der Neuzeit,“ in: Terra & Praehistoria. Festschrift für K.-D. Jäger, 1996.
- Umweltrekonstruktion (Archäologische Mitteilungen aus Nordwestdeutschland), 1996.
- "Die Landwirtschaft bei den Germanen und in den römischen Provinzen bis zur Völkerwanderungszeit: Haustierhaltung” and "Die Landwirtschaft im frühen Mittelalter (6.-10.Jh.): Garten, Obst und Weinbau” – Archäologische Fachliteratur (Beiträge zur Ur- und Frühgeschichte Mitteleuropas; 14), 2003.
- Die Pflanzenfunde von Starigard/Oldenburg, 2004.

- Frühe Nutzung pflanzlicher Ressourcen, ed. by Renate Rolle and Frank M. Andraschko (1999) is a festschrift dedicated to Willerding.
