= Deborah M. Pearsall =

American archaeologist (born 1950)

Deborah M. Pearsall (born 1950) is an American archaeologist who specializes in paleoethnobotany. She maintains an online phytolith database. She was a full professor in the Department of Anthropology at the University of Missouri in Columbia, Missouri, where she first began working in 1978 for 35 years. She is still in the department as a professor emerita after retiring in 2013.

== Life ==
Pearsall received her Ph.D. in anthropology from the University of Illinois at Urbana-Champaign in 1979, with a dissertation titled The Application of Ethnobotanical Techniques to the Problem of Subsistence in the Ecuadorian Formative.

Pearsall was awarded the 2002 Fryxell Award for Exceptional Interdisciplinary Research by the Society for American Archaeology. In 2020, she received the Distinguished Ethnobiologist Award by the Society of Ethnobiology.

== Selected publications ==
- Pearsall, D. M. 1993 "Contributions of Phytolith Analysis for Reconstructing Subsistence: Examples from Research in Ecuador." Pearsall, D. M. and Piperno, D. R. MASCA: Current Research in Phytolith Analysis: Applications in Archaeology and Paleoecology 10, 109-122.
- Pearsall, D. M. 2000 Paleoethnobotany: A Handbook of Procedures.
- Pearsall, D. M. 2002 "Maize is Still Ancient in Prehistoric Ecuador: The View from Real Alto, with Comments on Staller and Thompson." Journal of Archaeological Science 29:51-55.
- Pearsall, D. M., K. Chandler-Ezell, and J. A. Zeidler. 2004 "Maize in Ancient Ecuador: Results of Residue Analysis of Stone Tools from the Real Alto Site." Journal of Archaeological Science 31:423-442.
- Pearsall, D. M. and D. R. Piperno. 1990 "Antiquity of Maize Cultivation in Ecuador: Summary and Reevaluation of the Evidence." American Antiquity 55(2):324-337.
- Pearsall, D. M. 2003 "Integrating biological Data: Phytoliths and Starch grains, Health and Diet, at Real Alto, Ecuador." In Phytolith and Starch Research in the Australian-Pacific-Asian Regions: The State of the Art. Edited by D. M. Hart and L. A. Wallis. Terra Australis 19, Pandanus Books.
- Newsom, L. A. and D. M. Pearsall. 2003 "Trends in Caribbean Archaeobotany." pp. 347–412 in People and Plants in Ancient Eastern North America, edited by P. Minnis. Smithsonian Institution Press, Washington, D.C.
- Pearsall, D. M. 2006 "Modeling Agriculture through the Paleoenvironmental Record: Theoretical and Methodological Issues. In Rethinking Agriculture: Archaeological and Ethnoarchaeological Perspectives. Edited by T. P. Denham, J. Iriarte, and L. Vrydaghs. University College London Press.
- Pearsall, D. M. (ed.) 2008 Encyclopedia or Archaeology. Academic Press, San Diego and Oxford, UK.
