= Querfurt =

- Town
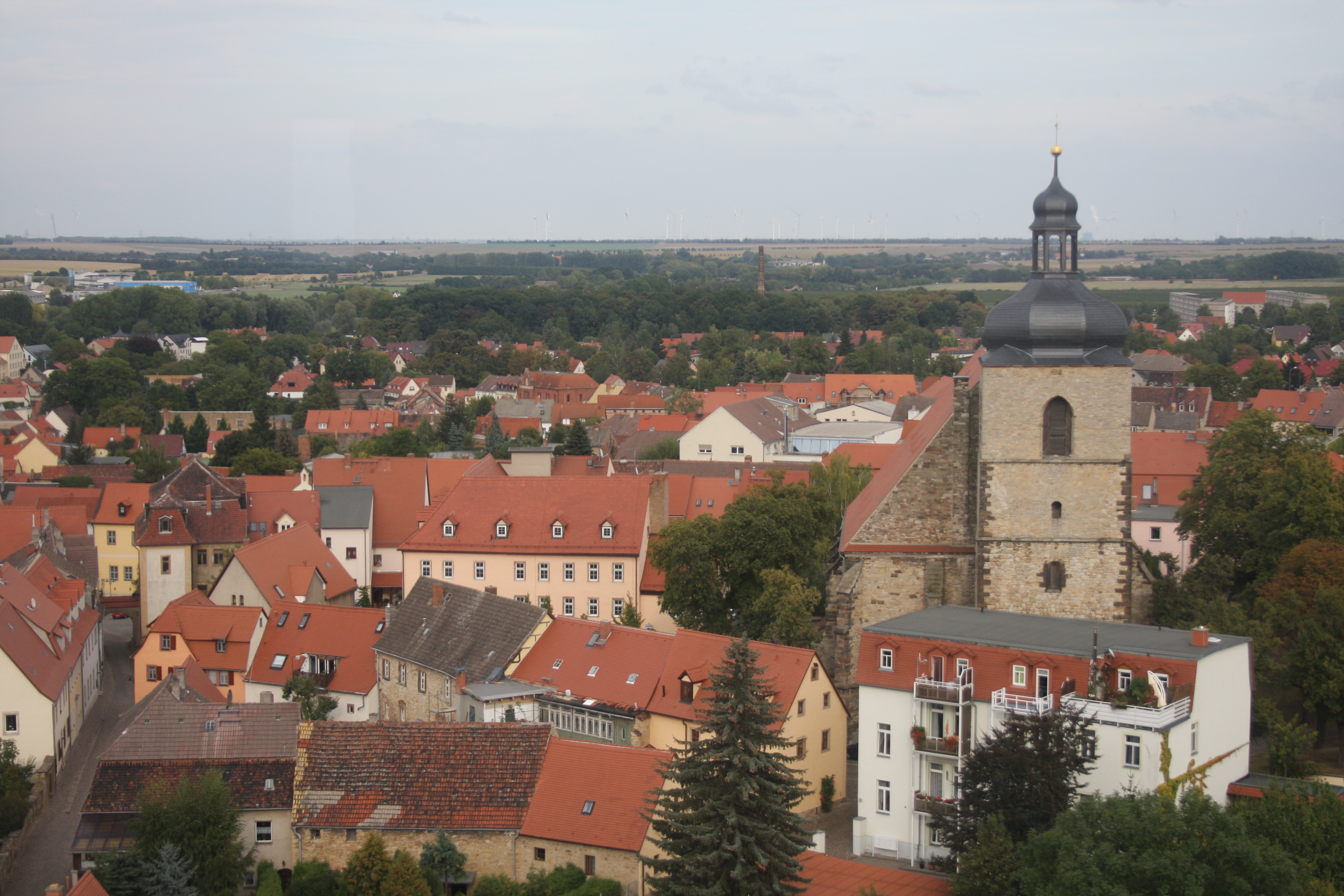
- Querfurt skyline

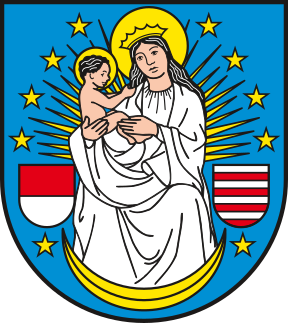
- Flag Coat of arms

- Location of Querfurt within Saalekreis district
- Interactive map of Querfurt
- Location within Germany Location within Saxony-Anhalt
- Coordinates: 51°23′N 11°36′E
- Country: Germany
- State: Saxony-Anhalt
- District: Saalekreis

Government
  - Mayor (2024–31): Andreas Nette

Area
  - Total: 155.23 km^{2} (59.93 sq mi)
- Elevation: 168 m (551 ft)

Population (2025-12-31)
  - Total: 9,868
  - Density: 63.57/km^{2} (164.6/sq mi)
- Time zone: UTC+01:00 (CET)
  - Summer (DST): UTC+02:00 (CEST)
- Postal codes: 06268
- Dialling codes: 034771
- Vehicle registration: SK, MER, MQ, QFT
- Website: www.querfurt.de

Querfurt (German: [ˈkveːɐ̯fʊʁt]) is a town in the Saalekreis district, or Kreis, in southern Saxony-Anhalt, Germany. It is located in a fertile area on the Querne, 18 miles (29 km) west of Merseburg. In 2020, the town had a population of 10,454. The town Querfurt consists of Querfurt proper and the following 8 Ortschaften or municipal divisions: Gatterstädt, Grockstädt, Leimbach, Lodersleben, Schmon, Vitzenburg, Weißenschirmbach and Ziegelroda.

Querfurt is known as the birthplace of Saint Bruno of Querfurt.

== History ==
For some time, Querfurt was the capital of a principality covering nearly 200 square miles (500 km^{2}), with a population of about 20,000. The ruling family having become extinct in 1496, it passed to that of Mansfeld. In 1635, according to the terms of the Peace of Prague, it was ceded to the Elector of Saxony, John George I, who handed it over to his son Augustus of Saxe-Weissenfels. In 1746, it was united once more with Saxony. It was incorporated into Prussia in 1815.

== Notable people ==
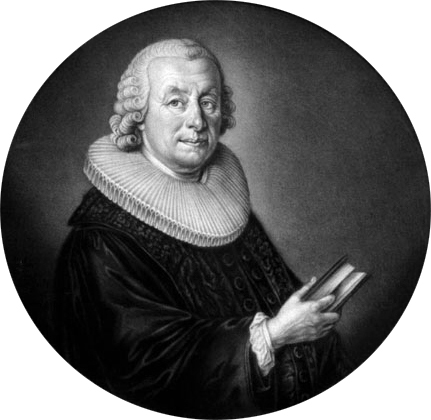
Jacob Christian Schäffer

- Jacob Christian Schäffer (1718–1790), a Protestant minister, naturalist, pioneer of the washing machine and the wood paper
- Johannes Schlaf (1862-1941), German playwright, author, and translator and an important exponent of Naturalism
- Georg Muche (1895–1987), Bauhaus artist, painter and graphic artist
- Walter Herrmann (1910–1987), physicist
- Ulrich Willerding (born 1932), botanist
- Dietmar Demuth (born 1955), football player and coach
- Jan Seyffarth (born 1986), racing driver

== Other personalities associated with the town ==
- Johann Gottfried Schnabel (born 1692, died between 1751 and 1758), German writer; settled down in 1719 as a barber in Querfurt.
- Julius von Kirchmann (1802–1884), lawyer and politician, law court official in Querfurt

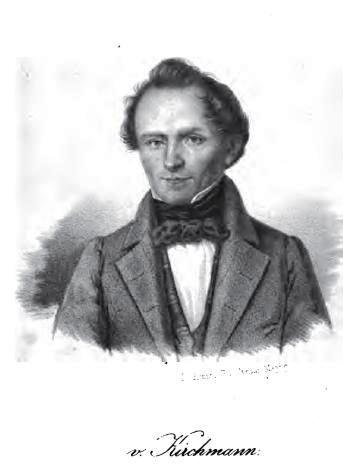
Julius von Kirchmann 1848/49

- Hans Schomburgk (1880–1967), explorer and pioneer of German wildlife films

== Gallery ==
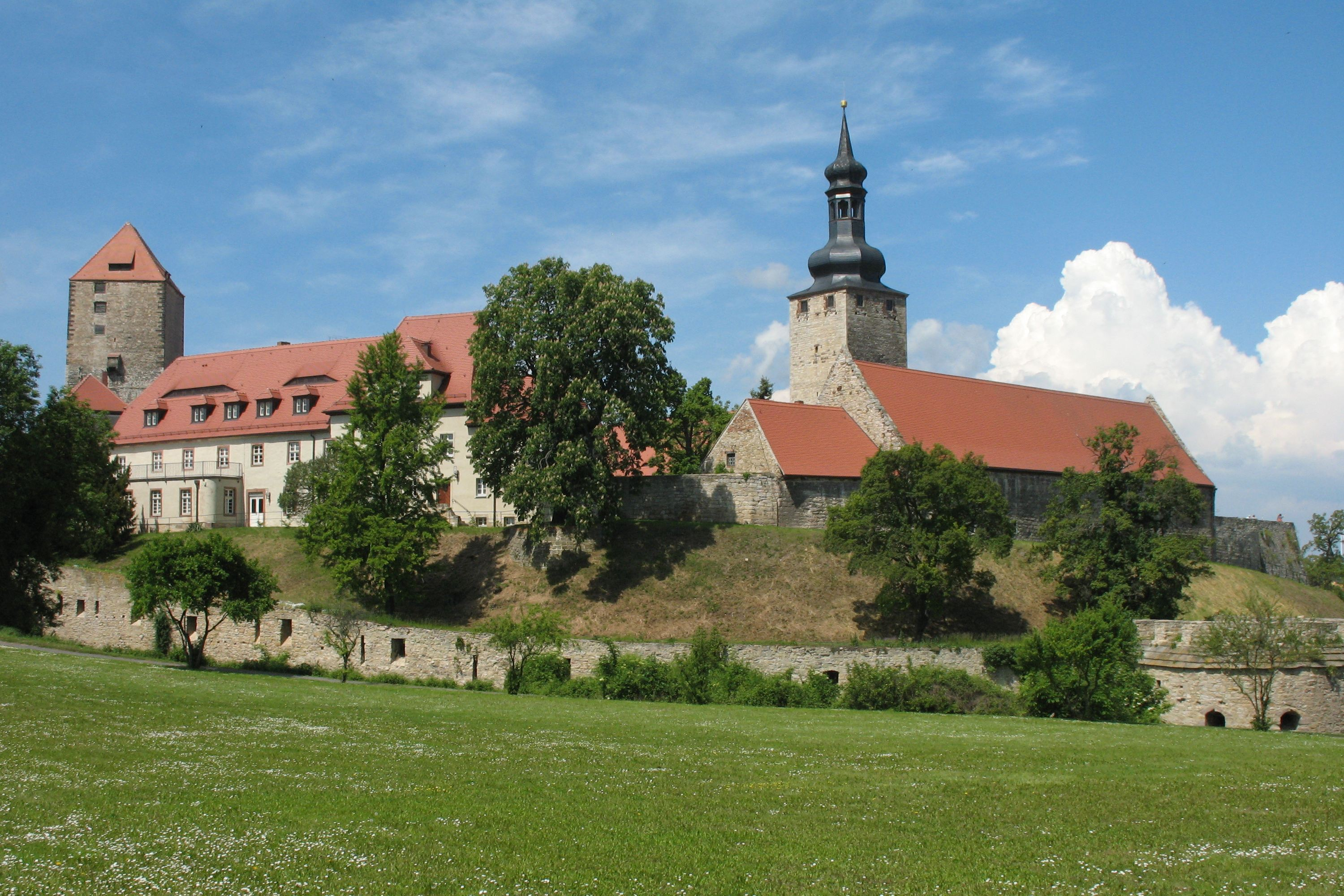
Castle

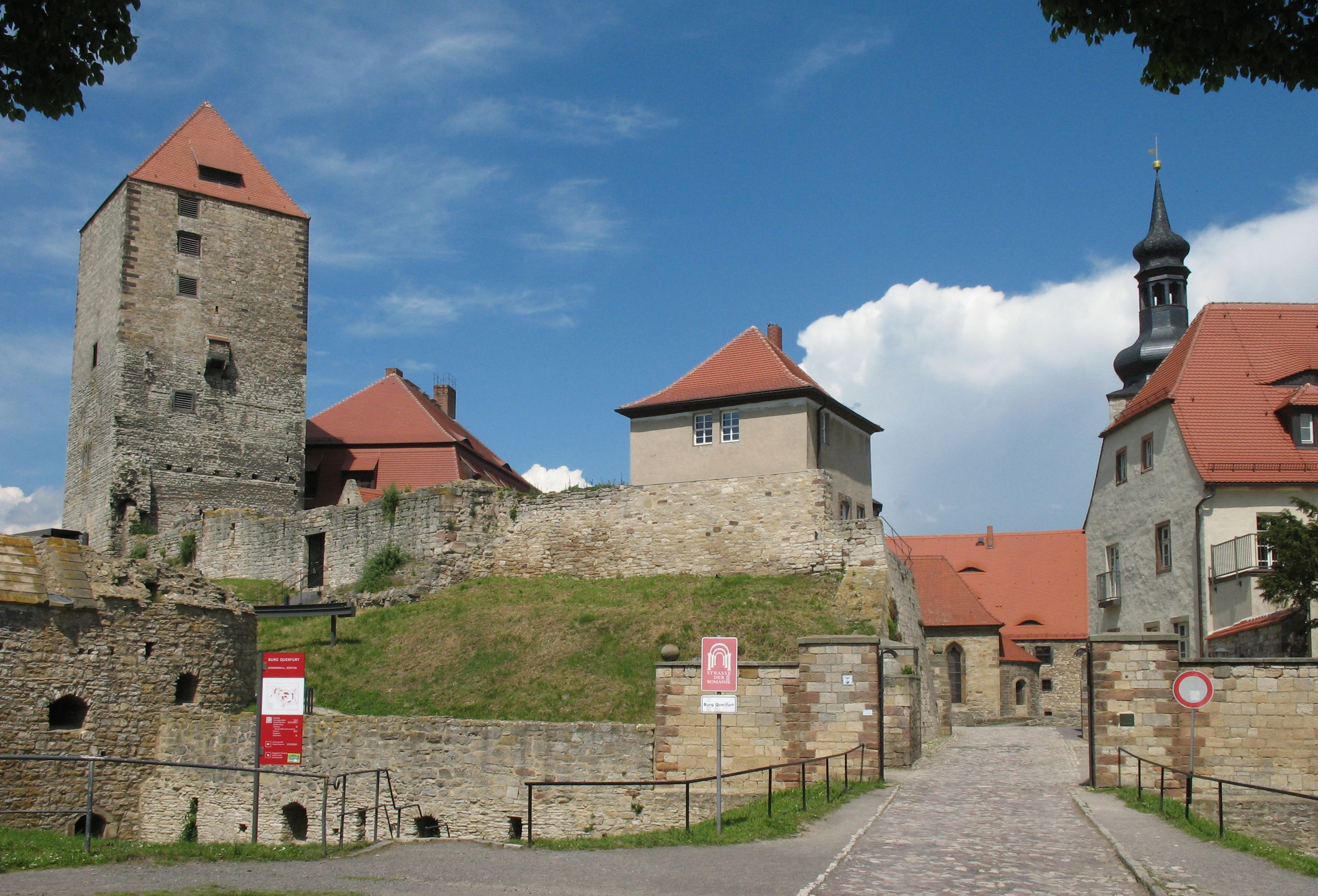

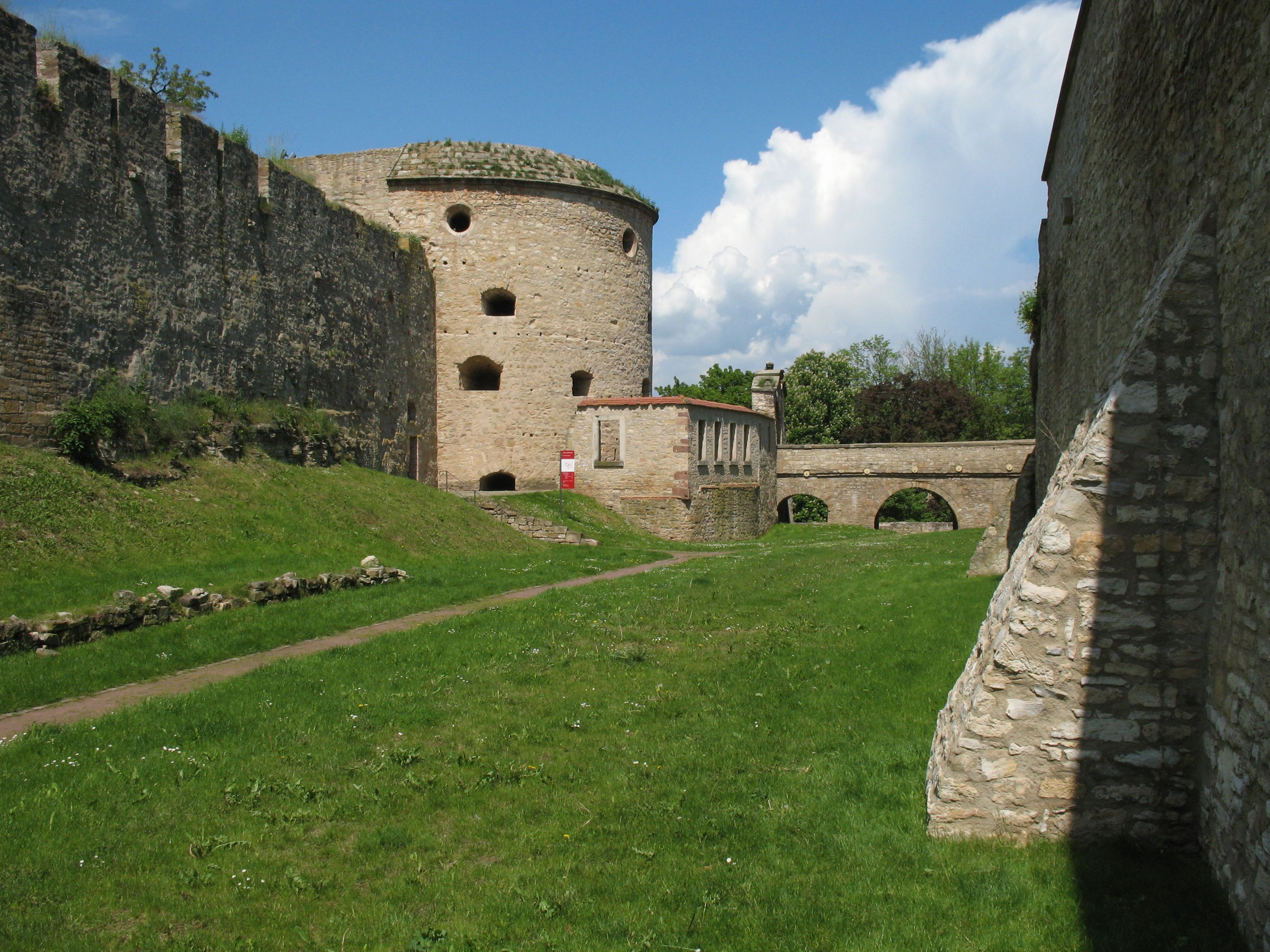

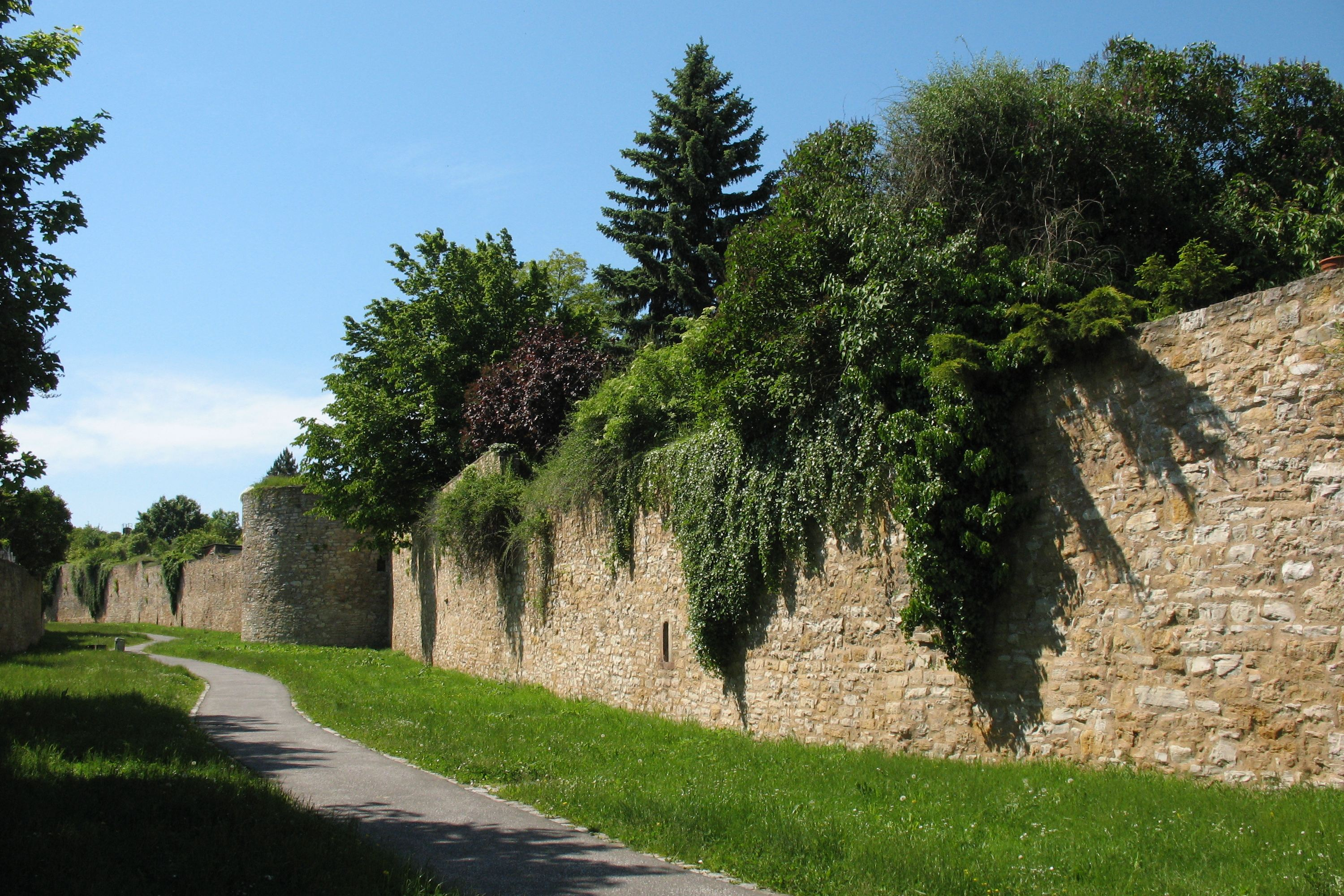
Town walls

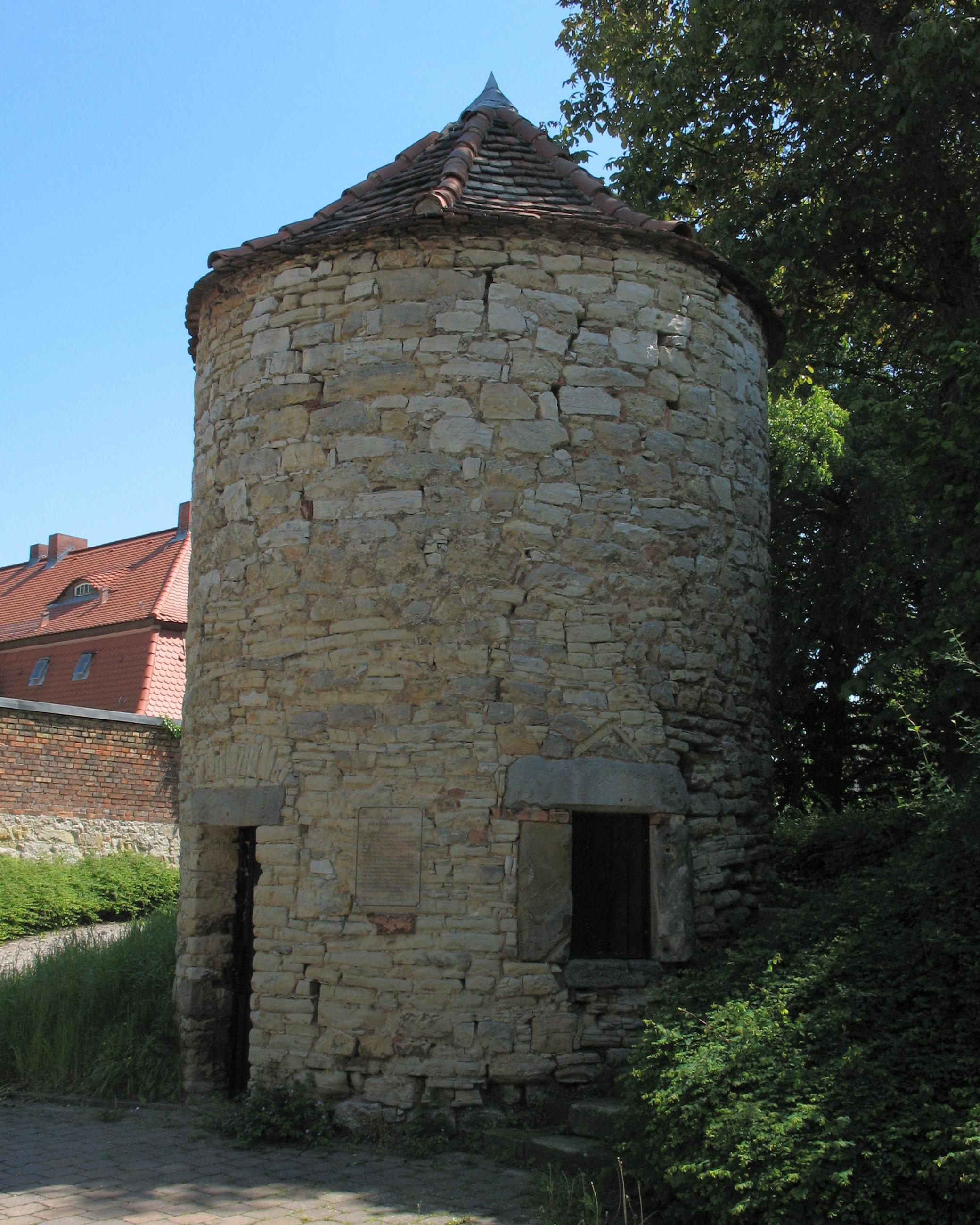
Defence tower

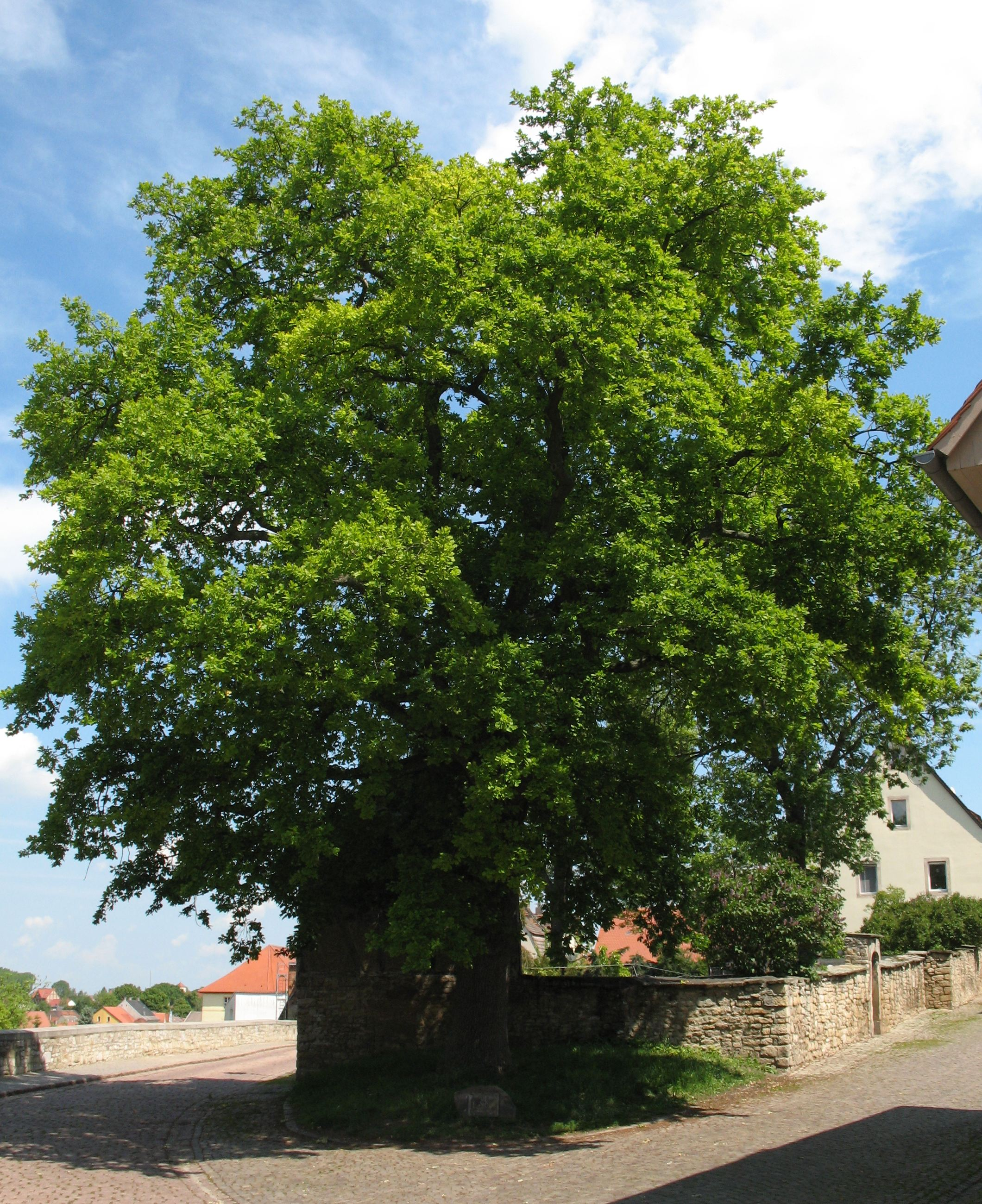
Oak of peace

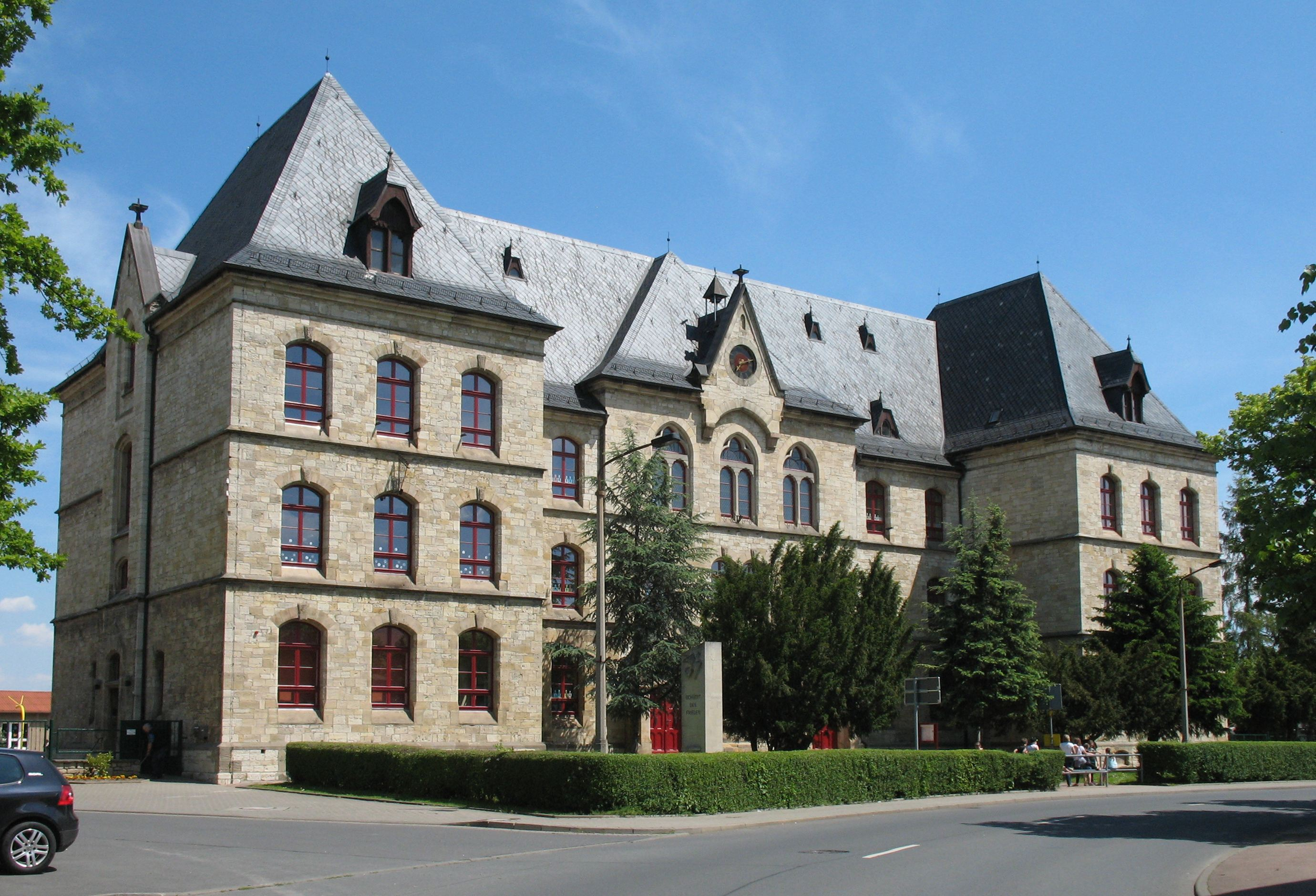
Elementary school
