= Mordechai Kislev =

Israeli emeritus professor

- מרדכי אפרים כסלו
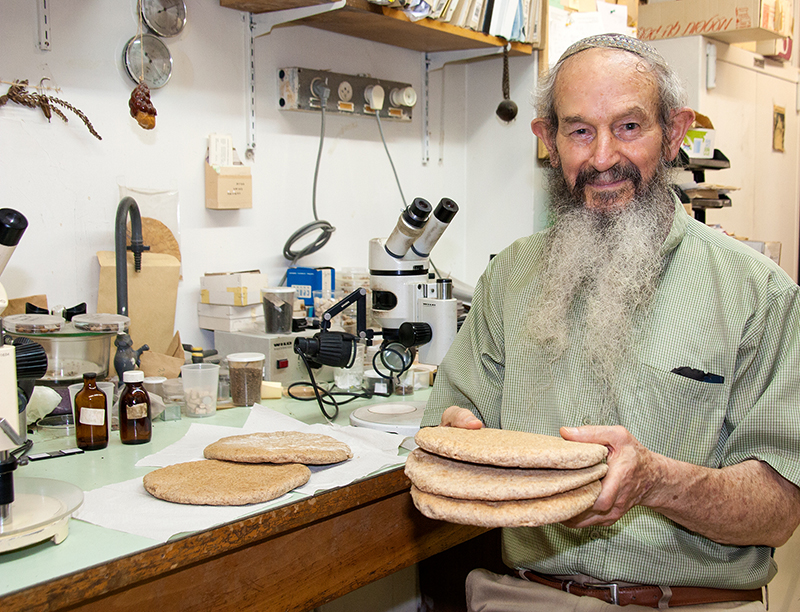
- Born: 8 May 1937 (age 89)
- Education: Hebrew University
- Scientific career
- Fields: archaeological botany
- Workplaces: Bar Ilan University
- Thesis: Pollination ecology of desert plants (1972)

Mordechai E. Kislev (Hebrew: מרדכי אפרים כסלו; born: 8 May 1937) is an Israeli emeritus professor in the Mina and Everard Goodman Faculty of Life Sciences at Bar-Ilan University, specializing in archaeological botany. Some of his prominent research focuses on prehistoric early agriculture and archaeological entomology. Other works explore the ancient landscape of the Land of Israel, as well as Torah and Science issues.

== Early life and education ==
Mordechai Kislev was born in Haifa. He studied at Kiryat Tiv'on high school, and when he was 17, enrolled in the Hebrew University and studied agriculture for a year. In 1955 he enlisted in the Nahal, and was one of the founders of Kibbutz Ein Gedi. Kislev continued to M.Sc. in botany (with minors: zoology and chemistry). He also studied in the Hebrew language department and for one year at the Talmud department in the Hebrew University, and his Ph.D. was received from the Hebrew University in botany in 1972. Kislev authored the thesis: Pollination ecology of desert plants under the supervision of Prof. M. Zohary and Prof. J. Galil.

== Career ==
Kislev was a postdoctoral researcher in archaeobotany during the years 1971–1973 at the Biologisch-Archaeologisch Institut, Groningen, Netherland and at the Institute of Archaeology, London, UK. He then joined Bar-Ilan University's department of Life Sciences as an instructor, and a year later as a Lecturer.

In 1974 he founded the archaeobotanical lab in Bar-Ilan. The lab is now run by his former students: Prof. Ehud Weiss, Dr. Yoel Melamed and Dr. Anat Schenkman-Hartmann. In 1979 he was promoted to a senior lecturer in the Life Science department and in the department of Eretz Israel Studies. Kislev became an associate professor in 1991 and a full professor in 1998, teaching and researching in both departments. Kislev was also a member of the appointments and discipline committees in the university. He was also a teacher in the Michlalah-Jerusalem College for 20 years.

In 2006 he retired as an emeritus professor, and continued working there for another 12 years. On 13 June 2008 an article was published in Science magazine about the germination of an about 1900 years old date seed, which was excavated at Masada.

== Research work ==
Kislev's research interests include: archaeobotany and storage archaeoentomology, origin of cultivated plants, archaeological entomology, Torah and Science.

Archaeobotany: using Archaeological findings such as seeds and fruits, Kislev's lab reconstructed ancient environments, climate changes, foods and commerce. Kislev has prepared together with his students computerized plant keys for classifying and identifying ancient seeds and fruits from the Middle East. Some of his prominent works include dating the beginning of agriculture using findings such as wheat, barley, olive and fig. In 1979 Kislev discovered a new, extinct wheat species, Triticum parvicoccum, found only in archaeological excavations. In 1985, Kislev found charred seeds of horse bean, dating back to the 7th millennium B.C. thus pushing back the known use of this vetch by about 2000 years. In 2006, Kislev's team discovered an early domesticated fig in the Jordan Valley, dating back to about 11,400 to 11,200 years ago.

Kislev is also engaged in identifying ancient species from the Middle East that disappeared as a result of climate changes. A sub-category of this field is the identification of fruit stones from the Roman age of Masada by comparing them with the varieties of olive, peach, plum and apricot that were preserved in the traditional arab agriculture in Israel.

Origin of domesticated plants: Kislev traces the beginnings of plants’ cultivation as well as that of the evolution of the species involved, such as the emergence of wheat agriculture.

Archaeological entomology: together with Dr. Orit Simchoni, Kislev studies the field that is influenced by the growing awareness to the usage of agriculture pest control. Kislev and Simchoni have found in archaeological site remains of a storage pest Lesser grain borer (Rhyzopertha Dominica). These insects feed, grow and reproduce in grains and other foods that are saved in storage houses. As a result of this study, Kislev suggests that this kind of pest was not present in Egypt during Joseph’s time. This can explain how he managed to store large amounts of food and save the Egyptians from hunger.

Torah and Science: Kislev work in this field focuses on Halachot relating to botany and zoology. The combination of Halacha and Archaeological Botany that Kislev pioneered, forms a base for new insights on the implementation of Halachot in areas such as Torah lessons, blessings, foods and more.

Notable examples are Kislev articles on Kezayit (in Hebrew: כְּזַיִת) – a volume unit in Jewish law which is approximately equal to the size of a common variety of olive), as well as on 'Kakotevet' (in Hebrew: כַּכּוֹתֶבֶת) – another volume unit similar to a date variety with very large fruits). In addition, in a recent article Kislev presents an actual question dealing on the Kashrut of insects in food – what is more healthy – eating 'clean' vegetables and fruits which contain harmful insecticides, or eating them with some unseen insects.

== Other professional work ==
Kislev is an advisory member of the Academy of the Hebrew Language and provides consultation on Hebrew Biological terms. He is also a member of the Committee on the Fauna and Flora of Israel in the Israel Academy of Sciences and Humanities.

== Publications ==
Prof. Kislev has authored more than 220 academic publications, eleven of them in Science Magazine. Kislev's articles were cited more than 5900 times and he has an h-index of 39.

=== Selected articles ===
- Kislev, M.E. 1982. Stem rust of wheat 3300 years old found in Israel. Science 216: 993–994.
- Kislev, M.E. 1985. Early Neolithic horsebean from Yiftah'el, Israel. Science 228: 319–320.
- Kislev, M.E. 1988. Pinus pinea in agriculture, culture and cult. Forschungen und Berichte zur Vor-und Frühgeschichte in Baden-Württemberg 31: 73–79.
- Kislev, M.E. and Bar-Yosef, O. 1988. The legumes: the earliest domesticated plants in the Near East? Current Anthropology 29: 175–179.
- Goren-Inbar, N., Feibel, C.S., Verosub, K.L., Melamed, Y., Kislev, M.E., Tchernov, E. and Saragusti, I. 2000. Pleistocene milestones on the out-of-Africa corridor at Gesher Benot Ya'aqov, Israel. Science 289: 944–947.
- Kislev, M.E., Weiss, E. and Hartmann, A. 2004. Impetus for sowing and the beginning of agriculture: Ground collecting of wild cereals. P.N.A.S. 101(9): 2692–2695.
- Nadel, D., Weiss, E., Simchoni, O., Tsatskin, A., Danin, A. and Kislev, M. 2004. Stone Age hut in Israel yields world's oldest evidence of bedding. P.N.A.S. 101 (17): 6821–6826.
- Goren-Inbar, N., Alperson, N., Kislev, M.E., Simchoni, O., Melamed, Y., Ben-Nun, A. and Werker, E. 2004. Evidence of Hominin control of fire at Gesher Benot Ya'aqov, Israel. Science 304: 725–727.
- Weiss, E. and Kislev, M.E. 2004. Plant remains as indicators for economic activity: a case study from Iron Age Ashkelon. Journal of Archaeological Science 31: 1–13.
- Kislev, M.E., Hartmann, A. and Galili, E. 2004. Archaeobotanical and archaeoentomological evidence from a well at Atlit-Yam indicates colder, more humid climate on the Israeli coast during the PPNC period. Journal of Archaeological Science 31: 1301–1310.
- Kislev, M.E., Hartmann, A. and Bar-Yosef, O. 2006. Early domesticated fig in the Jordan Valley. Science 312: 1372-1374 and 1292.
- Weiss, E., Kislev, M.E. and Hartmann, A. 2006. Autonomous cultivation before domestication. Science 312: 1608–1610.
- Hartmann, A., Kislev, M.E. and Weiss, E. 2006. How and when was wild wheat domesticated? Science 313: 296.
- Kislev, M.E., Hartmann, A. and Bar-Yosef, O. 2006. Response to comment on "Early domesticated fig in the Jordan Valley". Science 314: 1683a
- Sallon, S., Solowey, E., Cohen, Y., Korchinsky, R., Egli, M., Woodhatch, I., Simchoni, O. and Kislev, M. 2008. Germination, genetics and growth of an ancient date seed. Science 320: 1464.
- Sallon, S., Cohen, R., Egli, I., Solowey, E., Kislev, M. and Simchoni, O. 2008. Response to: Old seeds coming in from the cold. Science 322: 1789–1790.
- Melamed, Y., Plitmann, U. and Kislev, M.E. 2008. Vicia peregrina: an edible early Neolithic legume. Vegetation History and Archaeobotany 17 (suppl. 1): S29-S34.
- Weiss, E., Kislev, M.E., Simchoni, O., Nadel, D. and Tschauner, H. 2008. Plant-food preparation area on an Upper Paleolithic brush hut floor at Ohalo II, Israel. Journal of Archaeological Science 35: 2400–2414.
- Alperson-Afil, N., Sharon, G., Kislev, M., Melamed, Y., Zohar, I., Ashkenazi, S., Rabinovich, R., Biton, R., Werker, E., Hartman, G., Feibel, C. and Goren-Inbar, N. 2009. Spatial patterning revealing hominin behavioral modernity at Gesher Benot Ya'aqov, Israel. Science 326: 1677–1680.
- Kislev, M.E. 2015.
- Infested stored crops in the Iron Age I granary at Tel Hadar. Israel Journal of Plant Sciences 62: 86–97.
- Melamed, Y., Kislev, M., Geffen, E., Lev-Yadun, S. and Goren-Inbar, N. 2016. Acheulian fine vegetal dining at Gesher Benot Ya'aqov, Israel, 780,000 years ago. P.N.A.S. 113: 14674-14679

=== English abstracts of selected Hebrew articles ===
- Kislev, M.E. 1997. Dating the fall of Abi'or cave by the botanical remains. In: Y. Eshel (ed.). Judea and Samaria Research Studies 6: XV-XVI.
- Kislev, M.E. 2001. A man plant a seed from a gourd's fruit and it develops into a watermelon (Talmud Yerushalmi, Kilayim 1: 2). BDD 12: 56–57.
- Kislev, M. 2005. It's all in the eye of the beholder: reviewing the evaluation of the kezait, the volume of an olive. BDD 16: 95–96.
- Melamed, Y. and Kislev, M. 2005. Remains of seeds, fruits and insects from the excavations in the village of ‘En Gedi. ‘Atiqot 49: 139.
- Kislev, M. and Simchoni, O. 2007. A proposed explanation for the replacement of חותל by חותם in the Mishnah. Leshonenu 69 (1-2): III.
- Kislev, M., Tabak, Y. and Simchoni, O. 2007. Identifying the variety names of fruits in the Rabbinic literature. Leshonenu 69 (3-4): V.
- Kislev, M.E., Tabak-Kaniel, Y. and Simchoni, O. 2009. Identifying the plum names דורמסקן and אחון. Leshonenu 71: XII.
- Kislev, M.E. and Simchoni, O. 2009. The secret of a good life at Moyat Awad – a road station on the incense road. Judea and Samaria Research Studies 18: VIII.
- Kislev, M., Ziv, G. and Simchoni, O. 2009. The measure of Kakotevet Hagasa. BDD 22: 93–94.
- Kislev, M.E. and Simchoni, O. 2012. The kashrut of rye matzo. BDD 26: 70–71.
- Kislev, M.E. 2014. Can all Israel offer Paschal sacrifices in the limited space of the Holy Temple? BDD 29: 56.
- Kislev, M.E. and Simchoni, O. 2017. The kashrut of insects in food. BDD 32: 141–142.
