= Andreas G. Heiss =

Austrian archaeobotanist

- Born: 1978 (age 46–47)
- Education: University of Innsbruck; University of Natural Resources and Life Sciences, Vienna
- Scientific career
- Fields: Archaeobotany
- Institutions: Austrian Academy of Sciences

Andreas G. Heiss (born 1978) is an Austrian archaeobotanist and research group leader at the Austrian Archaeological Institute at the Austrian Academy of Sciences.

Originally from Schwaz, Tyrol, he studied at the University of Innsbruck (Master's degree, 2003; Doctorate, 2008) and the University of Natural Resources and Life Sciences, Vienna (Habilitation, 2020). He is co-founder and long-term board member of the Austrian Bioarchaeological Society and Committee Member of the International Work Group for Palaeoethnobotany.

== Research ==
Heiss investigates macrobotanical remains, such as seeds, fruits, wood and charcoal. He is known for pioneering methods using amorphous charred objects (ACOs) as a source of information for culinary archaeology. His work addresses cultures from Neolithic up to early modern period contexts in central Europe and the Mediterranean.

National and international media have reported on findings linked to Heiss's research on numerous occasions over the years. In 2019, the find of three charred cereal-based rings from Late Bronze Age Austria was compared to bagels and Cheerios by some media. In May 2020, coverage in German-language outlets (including Der Spiegel and ORF Science) quoted Heiss on evidence for possible beer brewing around Lake Constance and Lake Zurich in the 4th millennium BCE, based on a new microstructural marker for malting. In 2022, media outlets covered the discovery of an early Byzantine business and gastronomy district at Ephesos by an ÖAW team, for which Heiss conducted archaeobotanical analyses.

== Selected publications ==
- Stika, Hans-Peter; Heiss, Andreas G. (2013). "Plant Cultivation in the Bronze Age". In Fokkens, Harry; Harding, A. F. (eds.). The Oxford Handbook of the European Bronze Age. Oxford University Press. pp. 348–369. ISBN 978-0-19-957286-1.
- Anderson, Patricia C.; Peña-Chocarro, Leonor; Heiss, Andreas G., eds. (2015). EARTH: The Dynamics of Non-Industrial Agriculture: 8 000 Years of Resilience and Innovation. Vol. 1–3. Oxford: Oxbow Books. ISBN 978-1-78297-753-7.
- Heiss, Andreas G.; Berihuete Azorín, Marian; Antolín, Ferran; Kubiak-Martens, Lucy; Marinova, Elena; Arendt, Elke K.; Biliaderis, Costas G.; Kretschmer, Hermann; Lazaridou, Athina; Stika, Hans-Peter (7 May 2020). "Mashes to Mashes, Crust to Crust. Presenting a novel microstructural marker for malting in the archaeological record". PLOS ONE. 15 (5) e0231696. Bibcode:2020PLoSO..1531696H. doi:10.1371/journal.pone.0231696. PMC 7205394. PMID 32379784.

== Public outreach ==
In Austrian public broadcasting, Heiss has been discussing archaeobotany in a 31-episode Radio Wien series in 2012 and five Ö1 features in 2019 and 2020.

He has also contributed substantially to exhibitions on various topics, such as on the Iceman, "magical" plants, or ancient beer.
