= Irwin Rovner =

American archaeologist (1941–2025)

Irwin Rovner (May 30, 1941 – September 27, 2025) was an American archaeologist who initiated the study and use of phytoliths in archaeology. He retired from the faculty of North Carolina State University. Rovner was also CEO of Binary Analytical Consultants, which provides expert vision and computer-assisted morphometric analysis of micro- and macro- remains and artifacts in support of archaeological investigations. Rovner died on September 27, 2025, at the age of 84.

== Selected works ==
- 1971 "Potential of Opal Phytoliths for Use in Paleoecological Reconstruction," Quaternary Research 1: 343–359.
- 1983 "Plant Opal Phytolith Analysis: Major Advances in Archaeobotanical Research," pp. 225–266 in: Schiffer, Michael (ed.) Advances in Archaeological Method and Theory Academic Press, New York.
- John C. Russ and Irwin Rovner, 1989 "Stereological Identification of Opal Phytolith Populations from Wild and Cultivated Zea," American Antiquity 54 (4): 784–792.
