= Journal of Anthropological Archaeology =

Journal

- Discipline: Archaeology
- Language: English
- Edited by: M. Howey, G. R. Milner

Publication details
- History: 1982-present
- Publisher: Elsevier
- Frequency: Quarterly
- Impact factor: 2.287 (2020)

Standard abbreviations
- ISO 4: J. Anthropol. Archaeol.

Indexing
- ISSN: 0278-4165
- LCCN: 82644021
- OCLC no.: 637806874

Links
- Journal homepage

The Journal of Anthropological Archaeology is a peer-reviewed academic journal in the field of archaeology. The journal was founded in 1982, appears four times per year, and is published by Elsevier. Since its beginnings, the Journal of Anthropological Archaeology has produced 40 volumes. The current editor is John O'Shea (University of Michigan). Publications in the journal focus on understanding the operation, organization, and evolution of human societies. Contributions to the journal are not limited to those submissions by archaeologists only. Contributions from practitioners from fields and sub disciplines that complement the interests of the Journal of Anthropological Archaeology readership are commonplace. Articles may be published from ethnologists, ecologists, sociologists, and evolutionary biologists, in addition to archaeologists. The data expressed in the journal ranges from early archaeological evidence of human culture to work by contemporary ethnographers.

== Content Access ==
Authors have the option to choose between publishing their content as open access articles which allow the general public to access the information, or subscription access only. Subscription access only allows the article to be viewed by paying journal subscribers. Elsevier applies the same peer review criterion to articles regardless of the author's publication access decision.

== AudioSlides ==
The Journal of Anthropological Archaeology offers the AudioSlides service free of charge to the journal's contributors and readers. The service offers authors the opportunity to verbally explain their work. Audio files may be embedded in personal websites and are attached to their respective articles.

== Interactive Maps ==
The Journal of Anthropological Archaeology also offers interactive maps that allow readers to view geospatial data provided by the author through Google Maps. The interactive maps are KML or KMZ files uploaded by the author. These maps allow the author to pinpoint specific research locations and create annotations for those locations. They are also beneficial to readers who want to understand the author's geographical data and interact with it in an interesting way.
