= Illinois Archaeological Survey =

American professional society

- Formation: 1956
- Type: Society

The Illinois Archaeological Survey is a society of professional archaeologists and other technical professionals, dedicated to identifying and preserving important archaeological resources throughout the state of Illinois. The survey was founded in 1956 and is one of the oldest professional archaeological societies in the Americas. Beyond its bulletins, circulars, monographs, and special publications, the survey produces a peer-reviewed academic journal of archaeology entitled Illinois Archaeology. An annual fall conference focuses on some of the previous year's more significant archaeological endeavors. The annual business meeting takes place just prior to the conference.

The Illinois Archaeological Survey is governed by a board of directors, which convenes at the call of the president, typically three to four times per year. The board is composed of the survey's five elected officers (president, president-elect, secretary, treasurer, and editor), who typically serve two-year terms, and eight elected directors, who serve three-year terms.

The Illinois State Archaeological Survey is a distinct and separate entity with a similar name, although the Illinois Archaeological Survey was instrumental in joining the University of Illinois at Urbana–Champaign and the Illinois Department of Transportation to form the Illinois State Archaeological Survey. The latter is now housed at the Prairie Research Institute at the University of Illinois at Urbana–Champaign.

== History ==
The Illinois Archaeological Survey was conceived at the Urbana Archaeological Conference in January, 1956. The IAS has since been involved in a variety of activities. Illinois' state historic preservation office tasked the IAS with cataloging sites of interest in 1971. During that survey, the IAS, via partnerships with museums and universities, identified more than 25,000 sites, although not all of these have been made public. The IAS has sponsored the Illinois Archaeology Awareness Month, which takes place in September. Illinois celebrated its bicentennial in 2018, and the IAS produced a leaflet highlighting projects in the state beginning in the 1700-1800s. The site includes short videos depicting field work in Illinois.
