= Herbert D. G. Maschner =

Herbert D. G. Maschner (born 1959) is an American anthropologist and academic administrator. His research interests include biocomplexity and sustainability in prehistoric human ecology (particularly with respect to Arctic cultures), warfare and inequality in prehistory, the application of Darwinian theory and evolutionary psychology to archaeology, GIS in archaeology, isotope analysis and virtual museums and repositories.

Maschner was a professor at the University of Wisconsin–Madison (1993–1999), Idaho State University (1999–2015) and the University of South Florida (2015–2017). He resigned his professorship following controversy over his sexual harassment of a student at ISU and complaints about his conduct at USF.

== Career ==
Maschner studied at the University of Wyoming and at the University of New Mexico under Lewis Binford, graduating in 1980 with a BS in Anthropology. He received a master's degree in archaeology from the University of Alaska, Fairbanks in 1987 with a thesis entitled Site Structure, Site Use, and Site Reuse of an Ahtna (Na Dene) Spring Camp and a PhD in Anthropology from the University of California, Santa Barbara in 1992 with a dissertation entitled The Origins of Hunter-Gatherer Sedentism and Political Complexity: A Case Study from the Northern Northwest Coast. His PhD dissertation advisors included Brian Fagan and Napoleon Chagnon.

After a brief stint at UC Santa Barbara, Maschner was appointed assistant professor at the University of Wisconsin–Madison, a post he held from 1993 to 1999. He then moved to Idaho State University, where he was Research Professor in the Department of Anthropology. He created and directed the Center for Archaeology, Materials, and Applied Spectroscopy. Maschner was also affiliated with the Idaho Accelerator Center and was the Director of the Idaho Museum of Natural History between 2010 and 2015. In 2015 he moved to the University of South Florida as the director of the Center for Virtualization and Applied Spatial Technologies (CVAST), and a professor in the Department of Anthropology and School of Geosciences. In 2016, following the revelation that he had been reprimanded for sexual harassment in his former position at ISU, Maschner was demoted from his post as director of CVAST. He resigned from USF entirely in 2017, following further complaints about his conduct and a formal review.

Maschner was the keynote speaker for the Arctic Section of the 2003 conference of the American Association for the Advancement of the Sciences. He was named an Outstanding Researcher of Idaho State University in 2005 and 2006, an Idaho Academy of Science Distinguished Scientist in 2011, and most recently a visiting scientist at the Santa Fe Institute in 2012. He serves on the editorial boards of the Journal of World Prehistory and the Alaska Journal of Anthropology.

== Research ==
Maschner's research interests include complex systems analyses of the North Pacific Rim and Western North America, particularly the eastern Aleutian region, Northwest Coast, western sub-Arctic, and Idaho. Maschner's archaeological exploration of this geographic region is multidisciplinary and synthesizes both human and environmental factors to present a holistic understanding of the areas in question. Many native groups have drawn on Maschner's archaeological work as an aid in better understanding and preserving their cultural heritage. Maschner is also interested in the application of Darwinian evolutionary theory towards the study of social inequality and complexity in prehistory. He is one of the creators of the Virtual Zooarchaeology of the Arctic Project, an online database that contains comparative skeletal information on a wide range of fauna found in the Arctic. Also known as the VZAP, this online database is an example of the cutting-edge technology accessible to researchers like Maschner as well as the general public; it is utilized in a wide variety of archaeological disciplines to make otherwise difficult-to-access artifact or bone collections more easily viewed. Maschner is a prolific author, having written nine books, two monographs, one journal section, and numerous conference papers, professional reports, reviews, articles, and book chapters.

Maschner's field research has focuses on the archaeology and historical ecology of Alaska and the Pacific Northwest. He has directed field projects including:

- Forager Site Structure at Taznina Lake in Copper River Valley, Alaska (1985–1987)
- The Northwest Hunter-Gatherer Complexity Project at Tebenkof Bay at Kuiu Island in southeastern Alaska (1988–1994)
- The Warfare and Landscape in the North Project (1997–2002)
- The Lower Alaskan Peninsula and Eastern Aleutian Islands Catastrophic Change Project, on lagoon systems of the Bering Sea shore and at Morzhovoi and Cold Bays, particularly the Russell Creek Site (1994–2004)
- The Bering Sea Complexity Project (2001–2004)
- The Hot Springs site in Port Möller, Alaska (2002–2005)
- The Steller Sea Lion TEK and Aleut Historical Ecology/Geography Project on the Alaskan peninsula (2003–2006)
- The Sanak Island Complex Human-Ecological Systems Project (2004–2006)
- The Sanak Biocomplexity Project (2006–2010)
- The Virtual Zooarchaeology of the Arctic Project (2008–present)
- The Virtual Museum of Idaho Project (2011–present)
- The Virtual Repository of Arctic Archaeology (2012–present)

== Sexual harassment ==
Between July and October 2013, Maschner is alleged to have sexually harassed 28-year-old Kelly Pokorny, a graduate student employed as education resources coordinator at the Idaho Museum of Natural History. He was her supervisor at the time. According to Pokorny, he engaged in inappropriate conduct and showered her with unwanted attention for several months, culminating with him assaulting her in her office on October 25, 2013. Maschner allegedly entered her office, closed the door, grabbed her by the buttocks, and kissed her on the lips.

Pokorny filed a sexual harassment complaint with Idaho State University's Human Resources Office three days after the assault. Both the ISU Human Resources Office and Opportunity Office conducted investigations and determined that she was telling the truth. ISU issued a final report on January 9, 2014, concluding that her claim and statement of facts were credible, that Maschner's counterclaim and statement of facts were meritless, and that Maschner violated ISU's sexual harassment policy. Maschner was issued a formal reprimand and was suspended for two weeks without pay. He was also ordered to attend sexual harassment training, but he left Idaho State to begin work at South Florida before completing the required training. ISU's final report recommended that she be allowed to return to work as education coordinator at the museum with a different supervisor. Maschner requested on January 29, 2014, that the investigation of the original sexual harassment claim be reopened by the university. After further investigation, the equal opportunity office at ISU again reaffirmed the veracity of the sexual harassment claims against him.

=== Lawsuit ===
On 18 February 2015 Pokorny filed a lawsuit seeking monetary damages against Idaho State University for violations of the Idaho Human Rights Act and Title VII of the Civil Rights Act of 1964. Sixth District Judge Robert Naftz earlier rejected ISU's request to kill the case, writing that the original investigation by the school found the woman's claims credible and Maschner's claims meritless.

=== Employment at USF ===
Maschner took a position at the University of South Florida in August 2015. He did not inform his employer about his sexual harassment finding until more than a year later, when it became apparent that an Idaho newspaper was publishing an article about it. According to USF Maschner was not hired like other applicants and the university was not aware of the sexual harassment. In response, USF stripped him of his position as director of CVAST, although he remained employed as its tenured "chief scientist".

The following year, USF initiated a legal review of Maschner's conduct following complaints that he was a "hostile, sexist, boorish boss". The review concluded that Maschner was "hostile with many subordinates", but did not find evidence that his behaviour was discriminatory. Maschner resigned from USF shortly after the report was published.

== Selected publications ==
=== Monographs ===
- Archaeology of the Sapsuk River, Alaska. Herbert Maschner, Buck Benson, Garrett Knudsen, Nicole Misarti. 2010. Monographs of the Archaeology Branch, Alaska Region, Bureau of Indian Affairs.
- Peoples of the Northwest Coast: Their Prehistory and Archaeology. Kenneth Ames and Herbert Maschner. 1999. London: Thames and Hudson.

=== Edited volumes ===
- Sanak Island, Alaska: A Natural and Cultural History. Katherine Reedy‐Maschner and Herbert Maschner, editors. 2012. Idaho Museum of Natural History, Pocatello.
- The Northern World AD 900‐1400. Herbert Maschner, Owen Mason, Robert McGhee, editors. 2009.University of Utah Press, Salt Lake City.
- Time and Change: Archaeological and Anthropological Perspectives on the Long Term. Dimitra Papagianni, Robert H. Layton and Herbert Maschner. Edited by Dimitra Papagianni, Robert H. Layton, and Herbert Maschner. 2008. Oxford: Oxbow Press.
- Handbook of Archaeological Theories. R. Alexander Bentley, Herbert Maschner, and Christopher Chippindale, editors. 2007. Altamira Press.
- Handbook of Archaeological Methods. Herbert Maschner and Christopher Chippindale, editors. 2005. Altamira Press.
- Complex Systems and Archaeology: Empirical and Theoretical Applications. R. Alexander Bentley and Herbert D. G. Maschner, editors. 2003. University of Utah Press, Salt Lake City.
- Anthropology, Space, and Geographic Information Systems. Mark Aldenderfer and Herbert Maschner, editors. 1996. Oxford University Press.
- New Methods, Old Problems: Geographic Information Systems in Modern Archaeological Research. Herbert Maschner, editor. 1996. Center for Archaeological Investigations Press, Southern Illinois University.
- Darwinian Archaeologies. Herbert Maschner, editor. 1996. Interdisciplinary Contributions to Archaeology Series, Plenum Press.
- The Emergence of Cultural Complexity on the West Coast of North America. Herbert Maschner and Brian Fagan, editors. 1991. Special Section Antiquity, 65:921‐976.

=== Papers ===
- Indigenous, Ethnohistoric and Archaeological Perspectives on the Recent Decline of Steller Sea Lions (Eumetopias jubatus) in Alaska. Herbert D. G. Maschner, Andrew Trites, Katherine L. Reedy‐Maschner, Matthew Betts, Amber Tews, and Michael Livingston. Fish and Fisheries. 2012. Idaho State University Department of Anthropology, Pocatello, Idaho. 1-31
- Salmon, Complexity, and Sedentism along the North Pacific. Herbert D. G. Maschner, Oxford Handbook of Arctic Archaeology. Owen Mason and Max Frieson, editors. 2012. Oxford University Press, Oxford.
- Early retreat of the Alaska Peninsula Glacier Complex and the implications for coastal migrations of First Americans. Nicole Misarti, Bruce P. Finney, James W. Jordan, Herbert D. G. Maschner, Jason A. Addison, Mark D. Shapley, Andrea Krumhardt, James E. Beget. Quaternary Science Reviews. 2012. 48(1): 1-5.
- Oxford Handbook of North American Archaeology. Herbert D. G. Maschner, Archaeology of the North Pacific. Timothy Pauketat, editor. 2012. Oxford University Press, New York. Pp. 135‐145.
- Archaeology of the Northwest Coast. Herbert D. G. Maschner, Oxford Handbook of North American Archaeology. Pp. 160‐172. Timothy Pauketat, editor. 2012. Oxford University Press, New York.
- Reconstructing site organization in the eastern Aleutian Islands, Alaska, using multi‐element chemical analysis of soils. N. Misarti, N, B. Finney, and H. Maschner. 2011. Journal of Archaeological Science 38(7): 1441‐1455.
- The Virtual Zooarcaheology of the Arctic Project (VZAP). Herbert D. G. Maschner, Matthew Betts, Corey Schou. 2011. Pp. 41‐43. Society for American Archaeology Newsletter. January.
- Matthew W. Betts, Herbert D. G. Maschner, Corey D. Schou, Robert Schalder, Jonathan Holmes, Nicholas Clement, Michael Smuin. 2011. Journal of Archaeological Science. Volume: 38, Issue: 4, Pages: 755.e1‐755.e9.
- Virtual zooarchaeology: building a web‐based reference collection of northern vertebrates for archaeofaunal research and education. William Agger and Herbert Maschner. Norse Transatlantic Trade and the Spread of Typhus from North America to Eurasia. 2010. Gunderson Lutheran Medical Journal. Vol 6. No. 2. Pp. 54‐56.
- An Introduction to the Biocomplexity of Sanak Island, Western Gulf of Alaska. Herbert D. G. Maschner, M.W. Betts, J. Cornell, B. Finney, N. Huntly, J.W. Jordan, N. Misarti, K.L. Reedy‐Maschner, R. Russell, A. Tews, S. Wood, B. Benson. 2009. Pacific Science. 63(4):673-709.
- Medieval Norse and the Bi‐directional Spread of Epidemic Disease between Europe and Northeastern America: A New Hypothesis. William Agger and Herbert Maschner. 2009. In Herbert *Maschner, Owen Mason, Robert McGhee, editors. University of Utah Press. Pp. 321‐337.
- Fishtails, Ancestors, and Old Islanders: Chirikof Island, the Alaska Peninsula, and the Dynamics of Western Alaska Prehistory. Herbert D. G. Maschner. 2008. Alaska Journal of Anthropology. Pp. 171‐183.
- Catastrophic Events and Punctuated Culture Change: The Southern Bering Sea and North Pacific in a Dynamic Global System. Herbert D. G. Maschner and James W. Jordan. 2008. In Time and Change: Archaeological and Anthropological Perspectives on the Long Term edited by Dimitra Papagianni, Herbert Maschner, and Robert H. Layton. Oxford: Oxbow Press. Pp. 95‐113.
- Photon Activation for Archaeological Analysis at Idaho State University. Herbert D. G. Maschner, Buck Benson, Jaromy Green, and Douglas Wells. 2007. Photon Activation for Archaeological Analysis at Idaho State University. Proceedings of the 8th International Topical Meeting on Nuclear Applications and Utilization of Accelerators (AccAppʹ07), Pocatello, Idaho, July 29‐August 2, 2007. American Nuclear Society. Pp. 307‐312.
- Historic Warfare. Herbert Maschner. 2005. In The Encyclopedia of the Arctic. Edited by Mark Nuttall. Routledge Press. Pp. 2152‐2154
- Redating the Hot Springs Village Site. Herbert Maschner. 2004. Alaska Journal of Anthropology. Vol. 2, Nos 1‐2. Pp. 100‐116.
- Traditions Past and Present: Allen McCartney and the Izembek Phase of the Western Alaska Peninsula. Herbert Maschner. 2004. Arctic Anthropology. Vol. 41, No. 2, Pp. 98‐111.
- The Russell Creek Manifestation of the Arctic Small Tool Tradition on the Western Alaska Peninsula. Herbert Maschner and James Jordan. 2001. In Archaeology in the Aleut Zone of Alaska: Some Recent Research, Pp. 151‐172. Don E. Dumond, editor. University of Oregon Anthropological Papers No. 58.
- Coastal Paleogeography and Human Occupation of the Lower Alaska Peninsula. James Jordan and Herbert Maschner. 2000. Geoarchaeology: An International Journal. Volume 15, Issue 5, Pp. 385‐414.
- Sedentism, Settlement and Village Organization on the Lower Alaska Peninsula: A Preliminary Assessment. Herbert Maschner. 1999. Pp. 56‐76. In B. Billman and G. Feinman (editors). Settlement Pattern Studies in the Americas: Fifty Years since Viru. Washington: Smithsonian Institution Press.
- The Evolution of Northwest Coast Warfare. Herbert Maschner. 1997. In Troubled Times: Violence and Warfare in the Past. D.Martin and D.Frayer, editors. Gordon and Breach, Publishers. Pp. 267‐302.
- Settlement and Subsistence in the Later Prehistory of Tebenkof Bay, Kuiu Island. Herbert Maschner. 1997. Arctic Anthropology. Pp. 74‐99.
- American Beginnings and the Archaeology of Beringia: A Comment on Variability. Herbert Maschner. 1997. Review Article of American Beginnings, Frederick Hadleigh West, editor. Antiquity. Pp. 723‐728
- The Politics of Settlement Choice on the Prehistoric Northwest Coast. Herbert Maschner. 1996. Pp. 175‐189. In M. Aldenderfer and H. Maschner (editors). Anthropology, Space, and Geographic Information Systems. Oxford University Press.
- Geographic Information Systems in Archaeology. Herbert Maschner. 1996. Pp. 1‐21. In New Methods, Old Problems: Geographic Information Systems in Modern Archaeological Research H. Maschner, editor. Center for Archaeological Investigations Press.
- Theory, Technology, and the Future of Geographic Information Systems in Archaeology. Herbert Maschner. 1996. Pp. 301‐308. In New Methods, Old Problems: Geographic Information Systems in Modern Archaeological Research. H. Maschner, editor. Center for Archaeological Investigations Press.
- Darwinian Archaeologies: An Introductory Essay. Herbert Maschner and Steven Mithen. 1996. Pp. 3‐14. In H. Maschner, ed. Darwinian Archaeologies. Plenum Press.
- Kin‐Selection, Aggrandizement, and the Origin of Hereditary Social Inequality on the Northwest Coast. Herbert Maschner and John Patton. 1996. Pp. 89‐107. In H. Maschner, ed. Darwinian Archaeologies. Plenum Press.
- Geographic Information Systems in Archaeological Research. Herbert Maschner. 1996. Oxford Companion of Archaeology, Brian Fagan, general editor. Pp. 248‐250.
- Darwinian Approaches to Archaeology. Herbert Maschner. 1996. Oxford Companion of Archaeology, Brian Fagan, general editor. Pp. 167‐168.
