= Journal of Ethnobiology =

- Discipline: Ethnobiology
- Language: English
- Edited by: John Richard Stepp

Publication details
- History: 1981–present
- Publisher: Society of Ethnobiology
- Frequency: Quarterly
- Impact factor: 2.9 (2022)

Standard abbreviations
- ISO 4: J. Ethnobiol.

Indexing
- CODEN: JOUEE9
- ISSN: 0278-0771 (print); 2162-4496 (web)
- LCCN: 81643251
- OCLC no.: 819189649

Links
- Journal homepage; Journal page at SAGE; Online archive at SAGE

The Journal of Ethnobiology is a quarterly peer-reviewed academic journal covering ethnobiology. Founded in 1981, JoE is the oldest ethnobiological journal in the world. JoE is an interdisciplinary and transdisciplinary journal publishing work from across the biological sciences, ecological sciences, humanities and social sciences that explores human engagement with, and knowledge of, biophysical environments across space and time.

The journal publishes high-quality and high-impact research in the field of ethnobiology sensu lato. Work published in the journal demonstrates how an ethnobiological perspective can not only inform other related disciplines but also policy and practice for biocultural conservation.

The editor-in-chief is John Richard Stepp. According to the Journal Citation Reports, it has a 2022 impact factor of 2.9, making it the 7th (out of 92) highest ranked journal in the field of Anthropology, and in the top third of all Biology journals.
