= Paleoethnobotany =

Study of plants used by people in ancient times

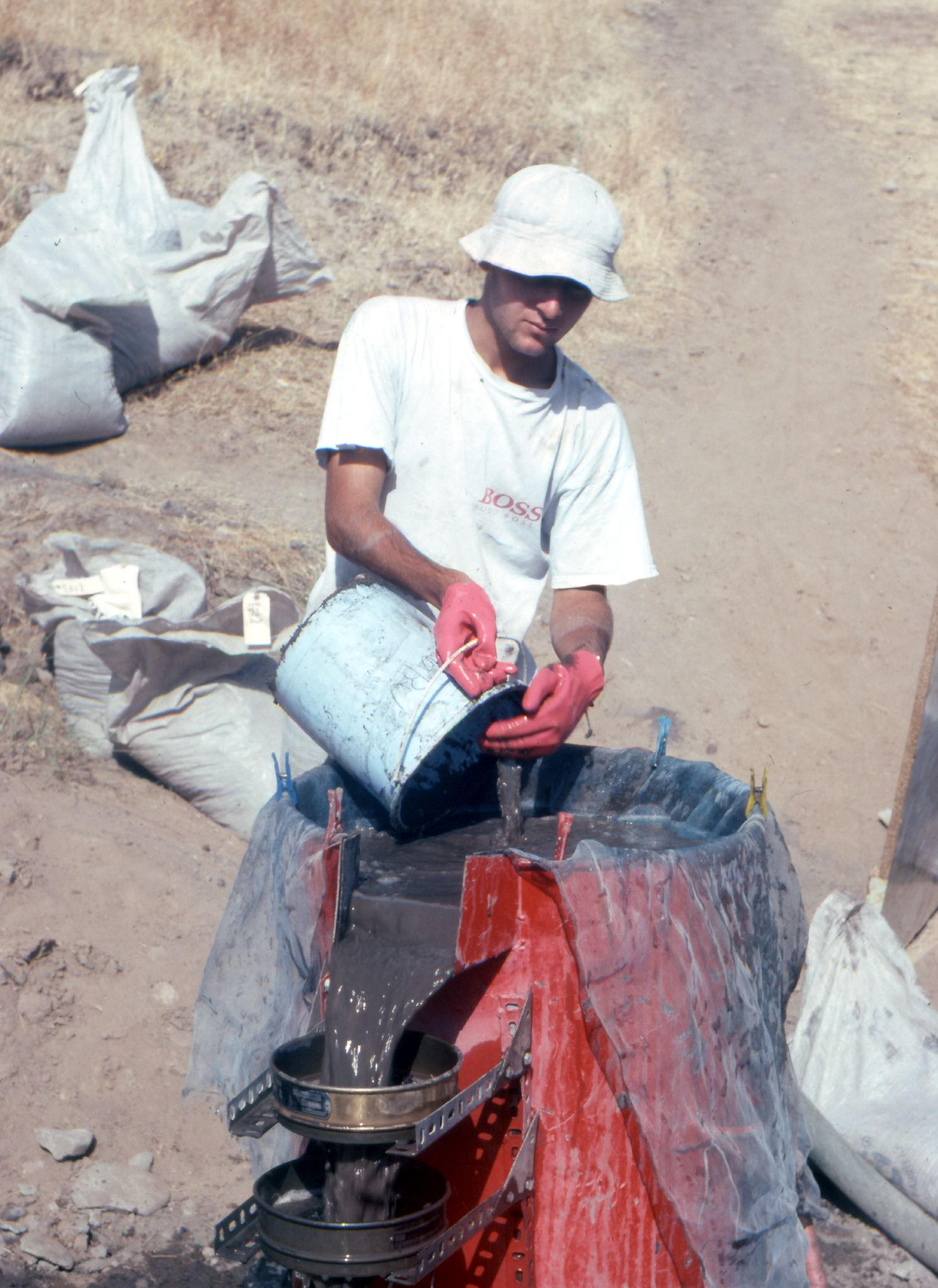
Flotation machine in use at Hallan Çemi, southeast Turkey, c. 1990. Note the two sieves catching charred seeds and charcoal, and the bags of archaeological sediment waiting for flotation.

Paleoethnobotany (also spelled palaeoethnobotany), or archaeobotany, is the study of past human-plant interactions through the recovery and analysis of ancient plant remains. Both terms are synonymous, though paleoethnobotany (from the Greek words palaios [παλαιός] meaning ancient, ethnos [έθνος] meaning race or ethnicity, and votano [βότανο] meaning plants) is generally used in North America and acknowledges the contribution that ethnographic studies have made towards our current understanding of ancient plant exploitation practices, while the term archaeobotany (from the Greek words archaios [αρχαίος] meaning ancient and votano) is preferred in Europe and emphasizes the discipline's role within archaeology.

As a field of study, paleoethnobotany is a subfield of environmental archaeology. It involves the investigation of both ancient environments and human activities related to those environments, as well as an understanding of how the two co-evolved. Plant remains recovered from ancient sediments within the landscape or at archaeological sites serve as the primary evidence for various research avenues within paleoethnobotany, such as the origins of plant domestication, the development of agriculture, paleoenvironmental reconstructions, subsistence strategies, paleodiets, economic structures, and more.

Paleoethnobotanical studies are divided into two categories: those concerning the Old World (Eurasia and Africa) and those that pertain to the New World (the Americas). While this division has an inherent geographical distinction to it, it also reflects the differences in the flora of the two separate areas. For example, maize only occurs in the New World, while olives only occur in the Old World. Within this broad division, paleoethnobotanists tend to further focus their studies on specific regions, such as the Near East or the Mediterranean, since regional differences in the types of recovered plant remains also exist.

== Macrobotanical vs. microbotanical remains ==
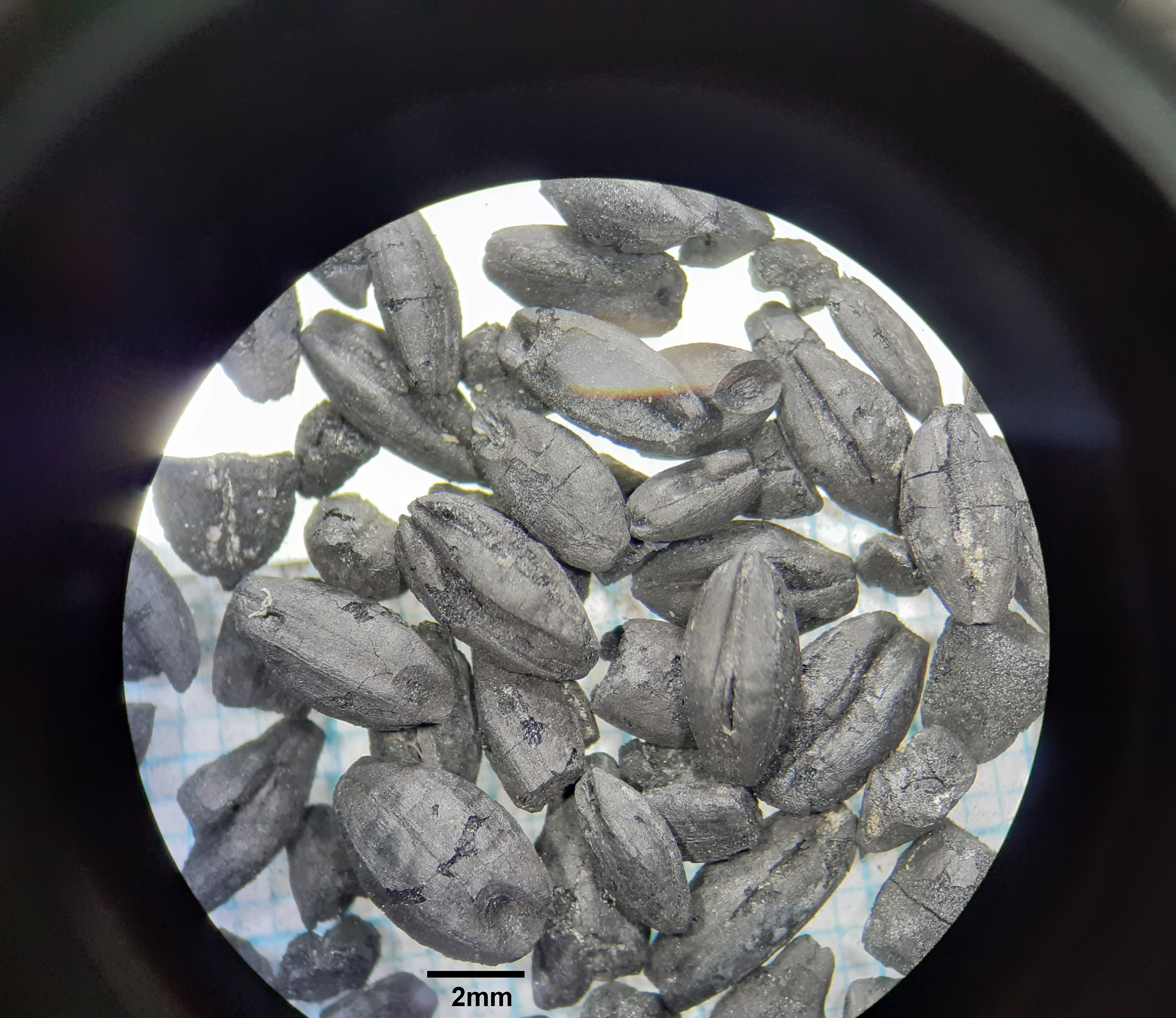
Charred barley grains viewed through a low-powered microscope.

Plant remains recovered from ancient sediments or archaeological sites are generally referred to as either 'macrobotanicals' or 'microbotanicals.'

Macrobotanical remains are vegetative parts of plants, such as seeds, leaves, stems and chaff, as well as wood and charcoal that can either be observed with the naked eye or with the use of a low-powered microscope.

Microbotanical remains consist of microscopic parts or components of plants, such as pollen grains, phytoliths and starch granules, that require the use of a high-powered microscope in order to see them.

The study of seeds, wood/charcoal, pollen, phytoliths and starches all require separate training, as slightly different techniques are employed for their processing and analysis. Paleoethnobotanists generally specialize in the study of a single type of macrobotanical or microbotanical remain, though they are familiar with the study of other types and can sometimes even specialize in more than one.

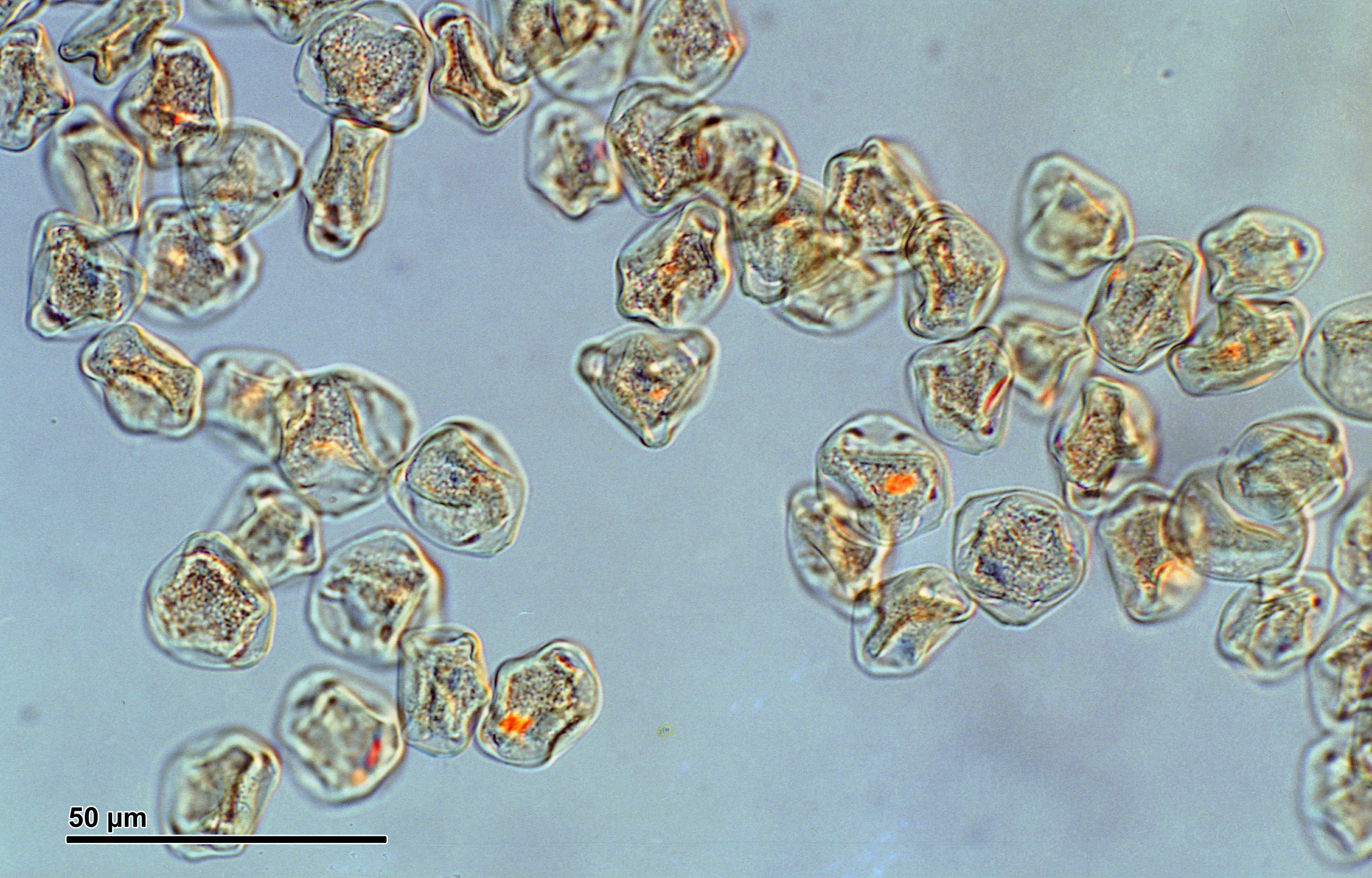
Pollen grains viewed through a high-powered microscope.

== History ==
The state of Paleoethnobotany as a discipline today stems from a long history of development that spans more than two hundred years. Its current form is the product of steady progression by all aspects of the field, including methodology, analysis and research.

=== Initial work ===
The study of ancient plant remains began in the 19th century as a result of chance encounters with desiccated and waterlogged material at archaeological sites. In Europe, the first analyses of plant macrofossils were conducted by the botanist C. Kunth (1826) on desiccated remains from Egyptian tombs and O. Heer (1866) on waterlogged specimens from lakeside villages in Switzerland, after which point archaeological plant remains became of interest and continued to be periodically studied from different European countries until the mid-20th century. In North America, the first analysis of plant remains occurred slightly later and did not generate the same interest in this type of archaeological evidence until the 1930s when Gilmore (1931) and Jones (1936) analysed desiccated material from rock shelters in the American Southwest. All these early studies, in both Europe and North America, largely focused on the simple identification of the plant remains in order to produce a list of the recovered taxa.

=== Establishment of the field ===
During the 1950s and 1960s, Paleoethnobotany gained significant recognition as a field of archaeological research with two significant events: the publication of the Star Carr excavations in the UK and the recovery of plant material from archaeological sites in the Near East. Both convinced the archaeological community of the importance of studying plant remains by demonstrating their potential contribution to the discipline; the former produced a detailed paleoenvironmental reconstruction that was integral to the archaeological interpretation of the site and the latter yielded the first evidence for plant domestication, which allowed for a fuller understanding of the archaeological record. Thereafter, the recovery and analysis of plant remains received greater attention as a part of archaeological investigations. In 1968, the International Work Group for Palaeoethnobotany (IWGP) was founded.

=== Expansion and growth ===
With the rise of Processual archaeology, the field of Paleoethnobotany began to grow significantly. The implementation in the 1970s of a new recovery method, called flotation, allowed archaeologists to begin systematically searching for plant macrofossils at every type of archaeological site. As a result, there was a sudden influx of material for archaeobotanical study, as carbonized and mineralized plant remains were becoming readily recovered from archaeological contexts. Increased emphasis on scientific analyses also renewed interest in the study of plant microbotanicals, such as phytoliths (1970s) and starches (1980s), while later advances in computational technology during the 1990s facilitated the application of software programs as tools for quantitative analysis. The 1980s and 1990s also saw the publication of several seminal volumes about Paleoethnobotany that demonstrated the sound theoretical framework in which the discipline operates. And finally, the popularization of Post-Processual archaeology in the 1990s, helped broaden the range of research topics addressed by paleoethnobotanists, for example 'food-related gender roles'.

=== Current state of the field ===
This image is part of reference collection work for archaeological dental calculus - i.e. looking at plants, animals and fungi from the inside to better understand them when finding them in archaeological samples. This image shows a piece of cranberry. This image was altered with AI to improve the quality and the colours

Paleoethnobotany is a discipline that is ever evolving. Since the 1990s, the field has continued to gain a better understanding of the processes responsible for creating plant assemblages in the archaeological record and to refine its analytical and methodological approaches accordingly. For example, current studies have become much more interdisciplinary, utilizing various lines of investigation in order to gain a fuller picture of the past plant economies. Research avenues also continue to explore new topics pertaining to ancient human-plant interactions, such as the potential use of plant remains in relation to their mnemonic or sensory properties. Interest in plant remains surged in the 2000s alongside the improvement of stable isotope analysis and its application to archaeology, including the potential to illuminate the intensity of agricultural labor, resilience, and long-term social and economic changes.

Archaeobotany had not been used extensively in Australia until recently. In 2018 a study of the Karnatukul site in the Little Sandy Desert of Western Australia showed evidence of continuous human habitation for around 50,000 years, by analysing wattle and other plant items.

== Modes of preservation ==
As organic matter, plant remains generally decay over time due to microbial activity. In order to be recovered in the archaeological record, therefore, plant material must be subject to specific environmental conditions or cultural contexts that prevent their natural degradation. Plant macrofossils recovered as paleoenvironmental, or archaeological specimens result from four main modes of preservation:

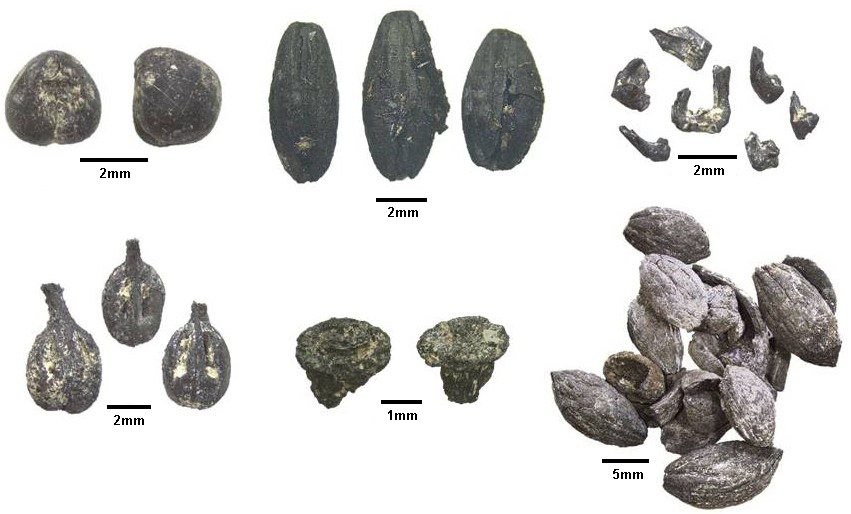
Charred Plant Remains. Clockwise from top left: bitter vetch (Vicia ervilia); barley (Hordeum sp.); glume wheat (Triticum sp.) glumebases and spikelet; olive stones (Olea europaea); grape pedicels (Vitis vinifera sp.); and grape pips (Vitis vinifera sp.).

1. Carbonized (Charred): Plant remains can survive in the archaeological record when they have been converted into charcoal through exposure to fire under low-oxygen conditions. Charred organic material is more resistant to deterioration, since it is only susceptible to chemical breakdown, which takes a long time (Weiner 2010). Due to the essential use of fire for many anthropogenic activities, carbonized remains constitute the most common type of plant macrofossil recovered from archaeological sites. This mode of preservation, however, tends to be biased towards plant remains that come into direct contact with fire for cooking or fuel purposes, as well as those that are more robust, such as cereal grains and nut shells.
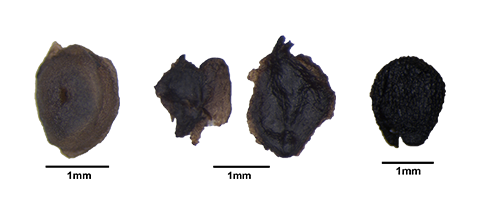
  Waterlogged Plant Remains. From left to right: bog pond weed (Potamogeton poligonifolius); birch (Betula sp.); and common scurvygrass (Cochlearia officinalis).
2. Waterlogged: Preservation of plant material can also occur when it is deposited in permanently wet, anoxic conditions, because the absence of oxygen prohibits microbial activity. This mode of preservation can occur in deep archaeological features, such as wells, and in lakebed or riverbed sediments adjacent to settlements. A wide range of plant remains are usually preserved as waterlogged material, including seeds, fruit stones, nutshells, leaves, straw and other vegetative matter.
3. Desiccated: Another mode by which plant material can be preserved is desiccation, which only occurs in very arid environments, such as deserts, where the absence of water limits decomposition of organic matter. Desiccated plant remains are a rarer recovery, but an incredibly important source of archaeological information, since all types of plant remains can survive, even very delicate vegetative attributes, such as onion skins and crocus stigmas (saffron), as well as woven textiles, bunches of flowers and entire fruits.
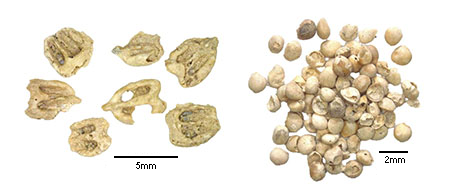
  Mineralized Plant Remains. Left to right: grape endosperms (Vitis vinifera sp.); and fig seeds (Ficus cf. carica).
4. Mineralized: Plant material can also preserve in the archaeological record when its soft organic tissues are completely replaced by inorganic minerals. There are two types of mineralization processes. The first, 'biomineralization,' occurs when certain plant remains, such as the fruits of Celtis sp. (hackberry) or nutlets of the Boraginaceae family, naturally produce increased amounts of calcium carbonate or silica throughout their growth, resulting in calcified or silicified specimens. The second, 'replacement mineralization,' occurs when plant remains absorb precipitating minerals present in the sediment or organic matter in which they are buried. This mode of preservation by mineralization only occurs under specific depositional conditions, usually involving a high presence of phosphate. Mineralized plant remains, therefore, are most commonly recovered from middens and latrine pits – contexts which often yield plant remains that have passed through the digestive track, such as spices, grape pips and fig seeds. The mineralization of plant material can also occur when remains are deposited alongside metal artefacts, especially those made of bronze or iron. In this circumstance, the soft organic tissues are replaced by the leaching of corrosion products that form over time on the metal objects.

In addition to the above-mentioned modes of preservation, plant remains can also be occasionally preserved in a frozen state or as impressions. The former occurs quite rarely, but a famous example comes from Ötzi, the 5,500 year old mummy found frozen in the French Alps, whose stomach contents revealed the plant and meat components of his last meal. The latter occurs more regularly, though plant impressions do not actually preserve the macrobotanical remains themselves, but rather their negative imprints in pliable materials like clay, mudbrick or plaster. Impressions often result from the deliberate employment of plant material for decorative or technological purposes (such as the use of leaves to create patterning on ceramics or the use of chaff as temper in the construction of mudbricks), however, they can also derive from accidental inclusions. Identification of plant impressions is achieved by creating a silicone cast of the imprints and studying them under the microscope.

== Recovery methods ==
In order to study ancient plant macrobotanical material, Paleoethnobotanists employ a variety of recovery strategies that involve different sampling and processing techniques depending on the kind of research questions they are addressing, the type of plant macrofossils they are expecting to recover and the location from which they are taking samples.

=== Sampling ===
In general, there are four different types of sampling methods that can be used for the recovery of plant macrofossils from an archaeological site:

- Full Coverage sampling: involves taking at least one sample from all contexts and features
- Judgement sampling: entails the sampling of only areas and features most likely to yield ancient plant remains, such as a hearth
- Random sampling: consists of taking random samples either arbitrarily or via a grid system
- Systematic sampling: involves taking samples at set intervals during excavation

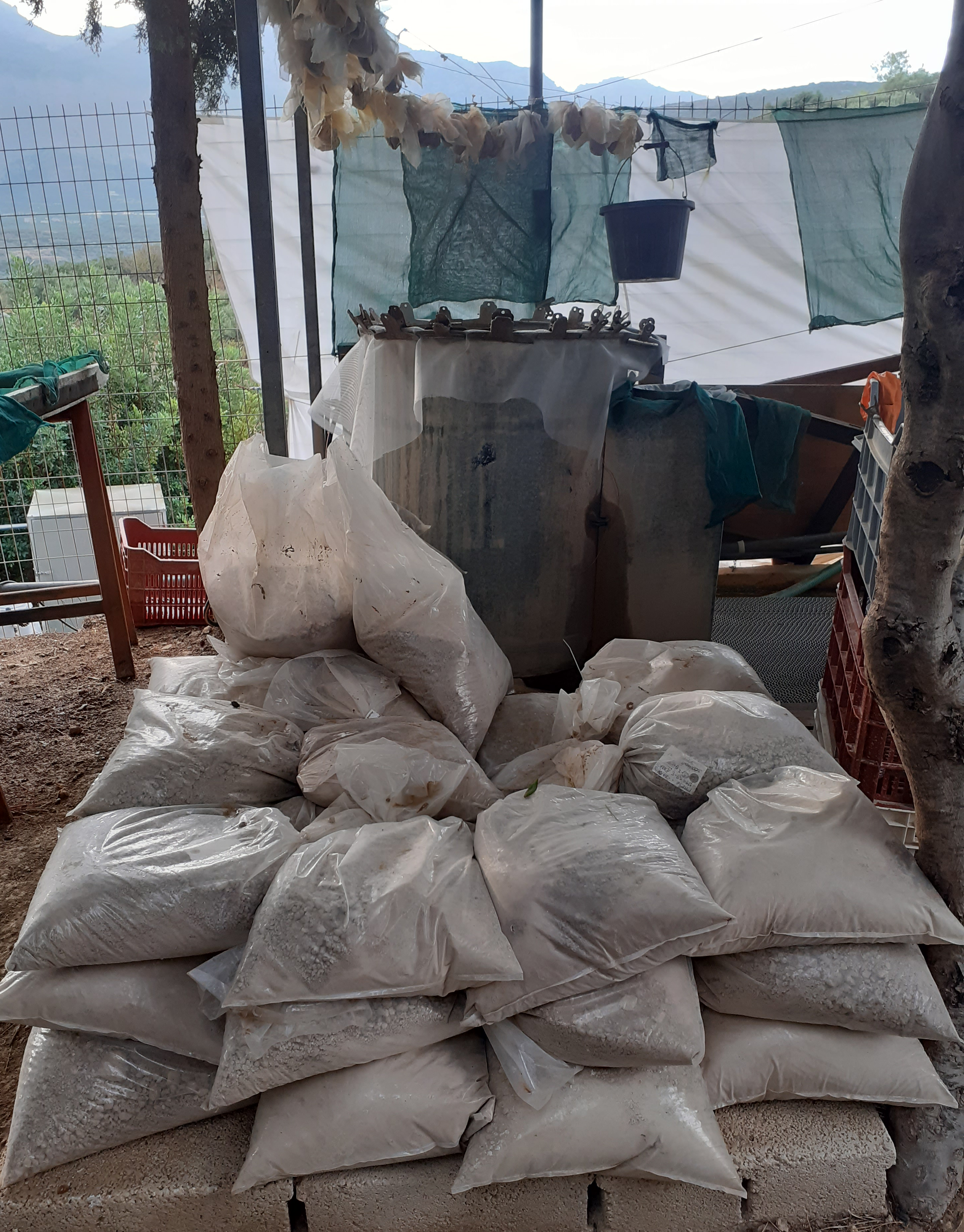
Sediment samples waiting to be processed by water flotation.

Each sampling method has its own pros and cons and for this reason, paleoethnobotanists sometimes implement more than one sampling method at a single site. In general, Systematic or Full Coverage sampling is always recommended whenever possible. The practicalities of excavation, however, and/or the type of archaeological site under investigation sometimes limit their use and Judgment sampling tends to occur more often than not.

Aside from sampling methods, there are also different types of samples that can be collected, for which the standard, recommended sample size is ~20L for dry sites and 1-5L for waterlogged sites.

- Point/Spot samples: consist of sediment collected only from a particular location
- Pinch samples: consist of small amounts of sediment that are collected from across the whole context and combined in one bag
- Column samples: consist of sediment collected from the different stratigraphic layers of a column of sediment that was deliberately left unexcavated

These different types of samples again serve different research aims. For example, Point/Spot samples can reveal the spatial differentiation of food-related activities, Pinch samples are representative of all activities associated with a specific context, and Column samples can show change or variation or time.

The sampling methods and types of samples used for the recovery of microbotanical remains (namely, pollen, phytoliths, and starches) follows virtually the same practices as outline above, with only some minor differences. First, the required sample size is much smaller: ~50g (a couple of tablespoons) of sediment for each type of microfossil analysis. Secondly, artefacts, such as stone tools and ceramics, can also be sampled for microbotanicals. And third, control samples from unexcavated areas in and around the site should always be collected for analytical purposes.

=== Processing ===
There are several different techniques for the processing of sediment samples. The technique a paleoethnobotanist chooses depends entirely upon the type of plant macrobotanical remains they expect to recover.

- Dry Screening involves pouring sediment samples through a nest of sieves, usually ranging from 5–0.5 mm. This processing technique is often employed as a means of recovering desiccated plant remains, since the use of water can weaken or damage this type of macrofossil and even accelerate its decomposition.
- Wet Screening is most often used for waterlogged contexts. It follows the same basic principle as dry screening, expect water is gently sprayed onto the sediment once it has been pour into the nest of sieves in order to help it break up and pass down through the various mesh sizes.

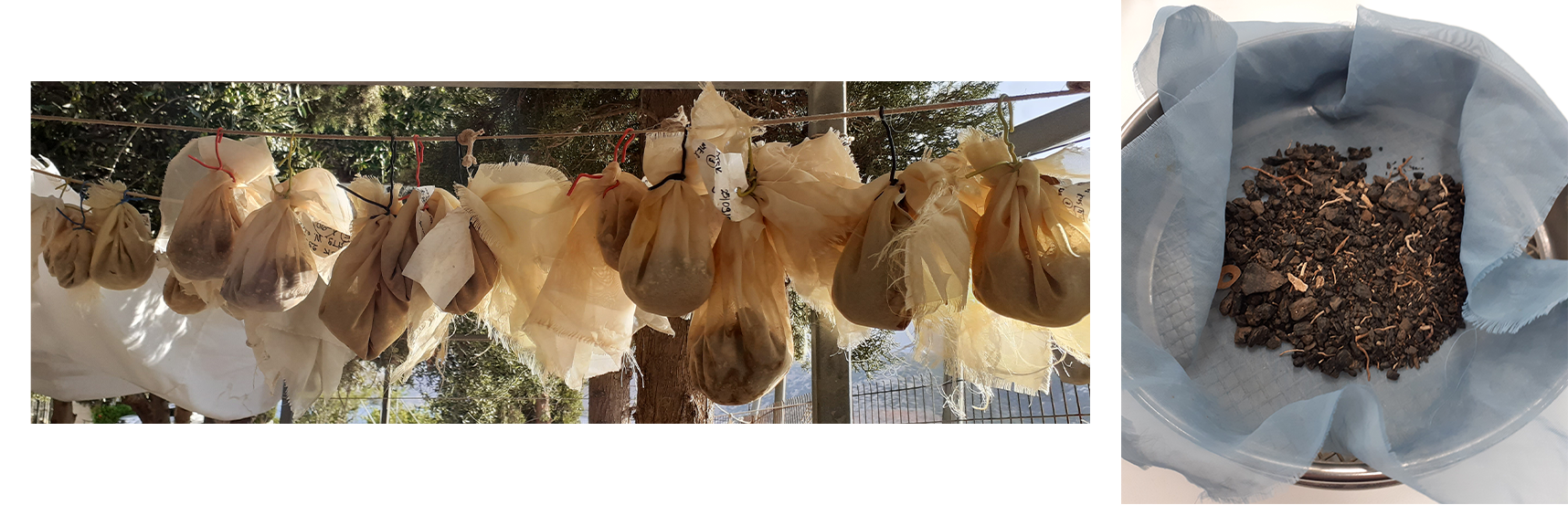
Left to right: Flots drying after water flotation processing; a dried flot ready to be analysed under the microscope.

- The Wash-Over technique was developed in the UK as an effective way of processing waterlogged samples. The sediment is poured into a bucket with water and gently agitated by hand. When the sediment has effectively broken up and the organic matter is suspended, all the contents from the bucket, expect for the heavy inorganic matter at the bottom, is carefully poured out onto a 300μ mesh. The bucket is then emptied and the organic matter carefully rinsed from the mesh back into the bucket. More water is added before the contents are again poured out through a nest of sieves.

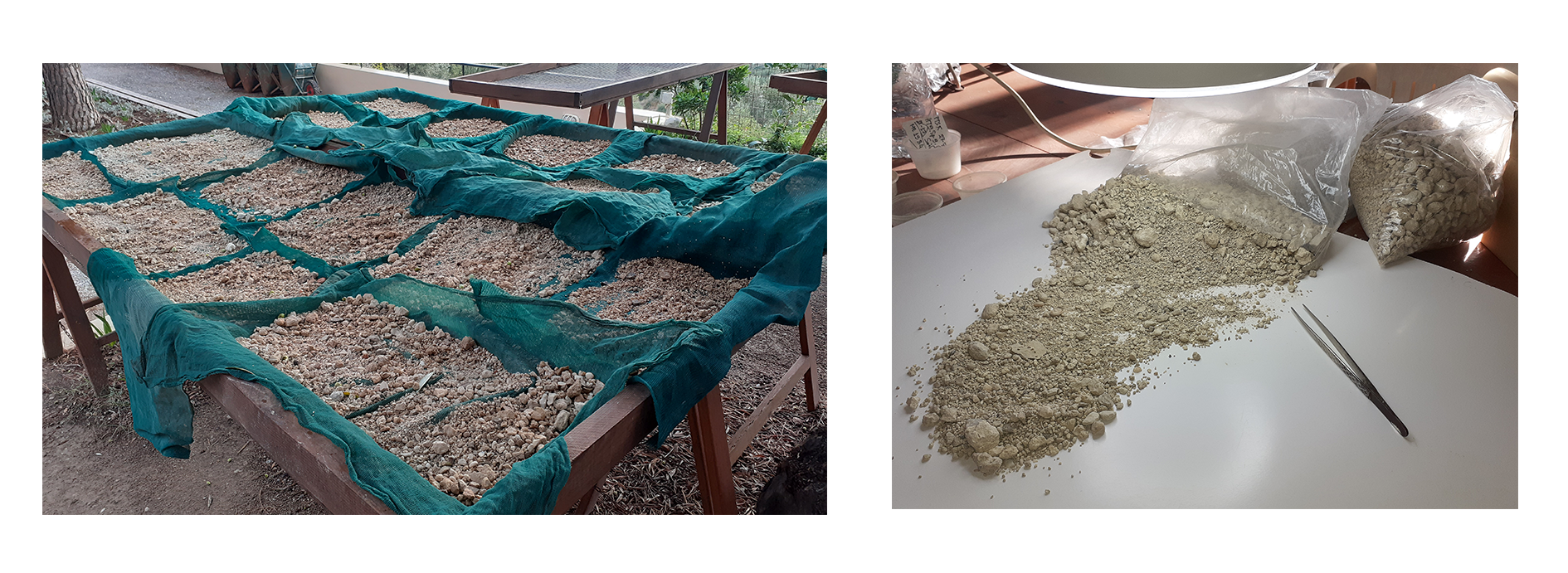
Left to right: Heavy residues drying after water flotation processing; a dried heavy residue being sorted with the naked eye.

- Flotation is the most common processing technique employed for the recovery of carbonized plant remains. It uses water as a mechanism for separating charred and organic material from the sediment matrix, by capitalizing on their buoyancy properties. When a sediment sample is slowly added to agitated water, the stones, sand, shells and other heavy material within the sediment sink to the bottom (heavy fraction or heavy residue), while the charred and organic material, which is less dense, float to the surface (light fraction or flot). This floating material can either be scooped off or spilled over into a fine-mesh sieve (usually ~300 μm). Both the heavy and light fractions are then left to dry before being examined for archaeological remains. Plant macrofossils are mostly contained within the light fraction, though some denser specimens, such as pulses or mineralized grape endosperms, are also sometimes found in the heavy fraction. Thus, each fraction must be sorted to extract all plant material. A microscope is used in order to aid the sorting of the light fractions, while heavy fractions are sorted with the naked eye. Flotation can be undertaken manually with buckets or by machine-assistance, which circulates the water through a series of tanks by means of a pump. Small-scale, manual flotation can also be used in the laboratory on waterlogged samples.

Microbotanical remains (namely, pollen, phytoliths and starches) require completely different processing procedures in order to extract specimens from the sediment matrix. These procedures can be quite expensive, as they involve various chemical solutions, and are always carried out in the laboratory.

== Analysis ==
Analysis is the key step in paleoethnobotanical studies that makes the interpretation of ancient plant remains possible. The quality of identifications and the use of different quantification methods are essential factors that influence the depth and breadth of interpretative results.

=== Identification ===
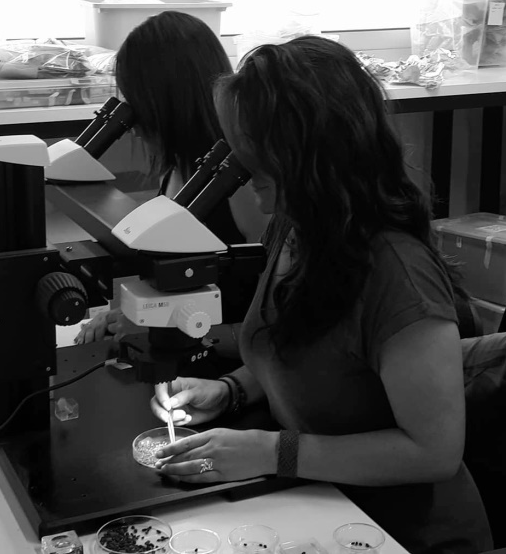
Archaeobotanist and student analysing plant remains under the microscope.

Plant macrofossils are analyzed under a low-powered stereomicroscope. The morphological features of different specimens, such as size, shape and surface decoration, are compared with images of modern plant material in identification literature, such as seed atlases, as well as real examples of modern plant material from reference collections, in order to make identifications. Based on the type of macrofossils and their level of preservation, identifications are made to various taxonomic levels, mostly family, genus and species. These taxonomic levels reflect varying degrees of identification specificity: families comprise big groups of similar type plants; genera make up smaller groups of more closely related plants within each family, and species consist of the different individual plants within each genus. Poor preservation, however, may require the creation of broader identification categories, such as 'nutshell' or 'cereal grain', while extremely good preservation and/or the application of analytical technology, such as Scanning Electron Microscopy (SEM) or Morphometric Analysis, may allow even more precise identification down to subspecies or variety level

Desiccated and waterlogged macrofossils often have a very similar appearance with modern plant material, since their modes of preservation do not directly affect the remains. As a result, fragile seed features, such as anthers or wings, and occasionally even color, can be preserved, allowing for very precise identifications of this material. The high temperatures involved in the carbonization of plant remains, however, can sometimes cause the damage to or loss of plant macrofossil features. The analysis of charred plant material, therefore, often includes several family- or genus-level identifications, as well as some specimen categories. Mineralized plant macrofossils can range in preservation from detailed copies to rough casts depending on depositional conditions and the kind of replacing mineral. This type of macrofossil can easily be mistaken for stones by the untrained eye.

Microbotanical remains follow the same identification principles, but require a high-powered (greater magnification) microscope with transmitted or polarized lighting. Starch and phytolith identifications are also subject to limitations, in terms of taxonomical specificity, based on the state of current reference material for comparison and considerable overlap in specimen morphologies.

=== Quantification ===
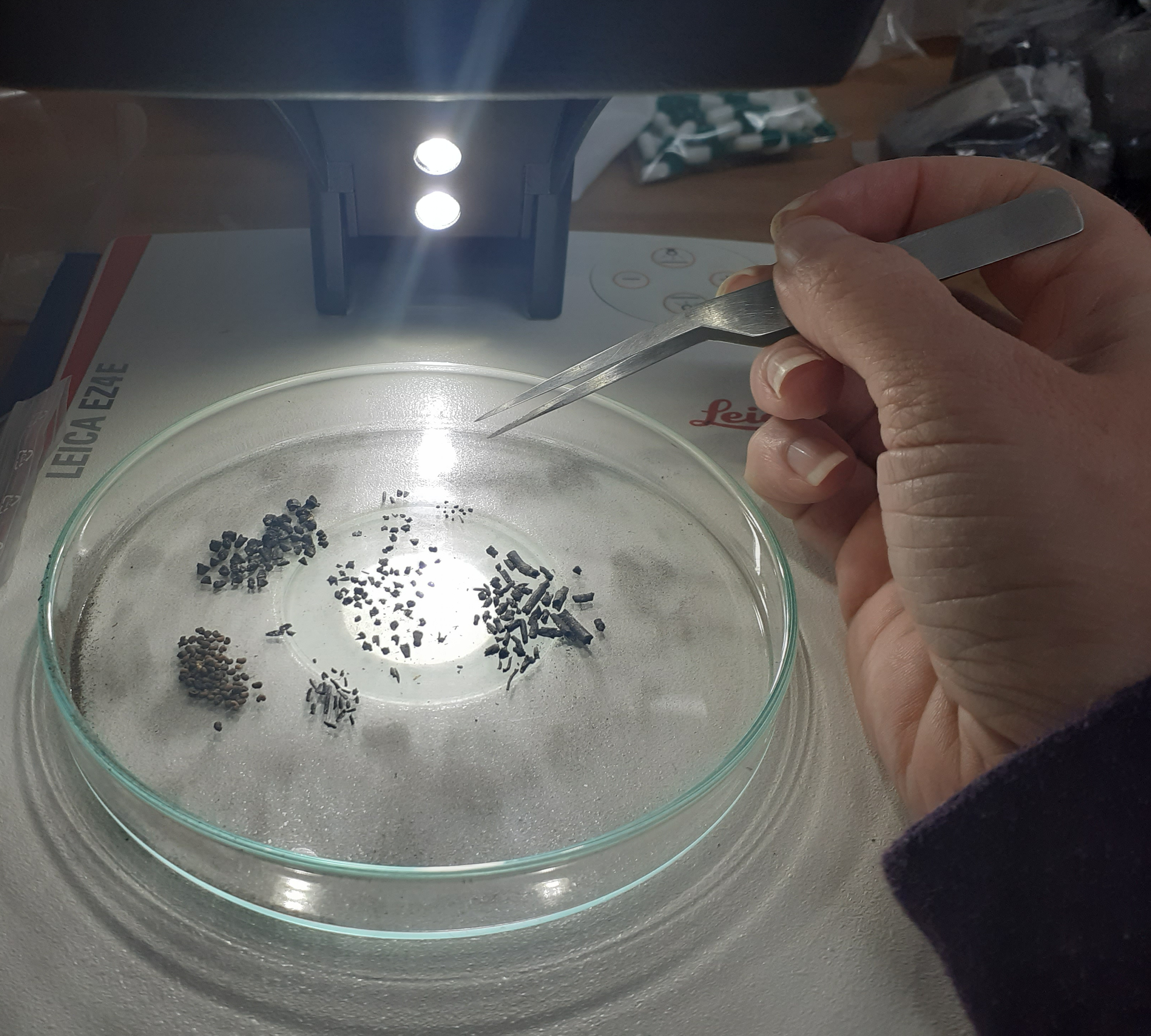
Charred plant remains being grouped by taxa type and quantified under the microscope.

After identification, paleoethnobotanists provide absolute counts for all plant macrofossils recovered in each individual sample. These counts constitute the raw analytical data and serve as the basis for any further quantitative methods that may be applied. Initially, paleoethnobotanical studies mostly involved a qualitative assessment of the plant remains at an archaeological site (presence and absence), but the application of simple statistical methods (non-multivariate) followed shortly thereafter. The use of more complex statistics (multivariate), however, is a more recent development. In general, simple statistics allow for observations concerning specimen values across space and over time, while more complex statistics facilitate the recognition of patterning within an assemblage, as well as the presentation of large datasets. The application of different statistical techniques depends on the quantity of material available. Complex statistics require the recovery of a large number of specimens (usually around 150 from each sample involved in this type of quantitative analysis), whereas simple statistics can be applied regardless of the amount of recovered specimens – though obviously, the more specimens, the more effective the results.

The quantification of microbotanical remains differs slightly from that of macrobotanical remains, mostly due to the high numbers of microbotanical specimens that are usually present in samples. As a result, relative/percentage occurrence sums are usually employed in the quantification of microbotanical remains instead of absolute taxa counts.

== Research results ==
The work done in Paleoethnobotany is constantly furthering over understanding of ancient plant exploitation practices. The results are disseminated in digital archives, archaeological excavation reports and at academic conferences, as well as in books and journals related to archaeology, anthropology, plant history, paleoecology, and social sciences. In addition to the use of plants as food, such as paleodiet, subsistence strategies and agriculture, Paleoethnobotany has illuminated many other ancient uses for plants (some examples provided below, though there are many more):

- Production of bread/pastry in the widest sense
- Production of beverages
- Extraction of oils and dyes
- Agricultural regimes (irrigation, manuring, and sowing)
- Economic practices (production, storage, and trade)
- Building materials
- Fuel
- Symbolic use in ritual activities

== See also ==
- Anthracology
- Palynology
- Dendrochronology
- Ethnobotany
- Paleobotany
- List of paleoethnobotanists
- Taphonomy

== Bibliography ==
- Twiss, K.C. 2019. The Archaeology of Food. Cambridge: Cambridge University Press. ISBN 9781108670159
- Kristen J.G. 1997. People, Plants, and Landscapes: Studies in Paleoethnobotany. Alabama: University of Alabama Press. ISBN 0-8173-0827-X.
- Miksicek, C.H.1987. "Formation Processes of the Archaeobotanical Record." In M.B.Schiffer (ed.). Advances in Archaeological Method and Theory 10. New York: Academic Press, 211–247. ISBN 0-12-003110-8.
