= Founder crops =

Original agricultural crops

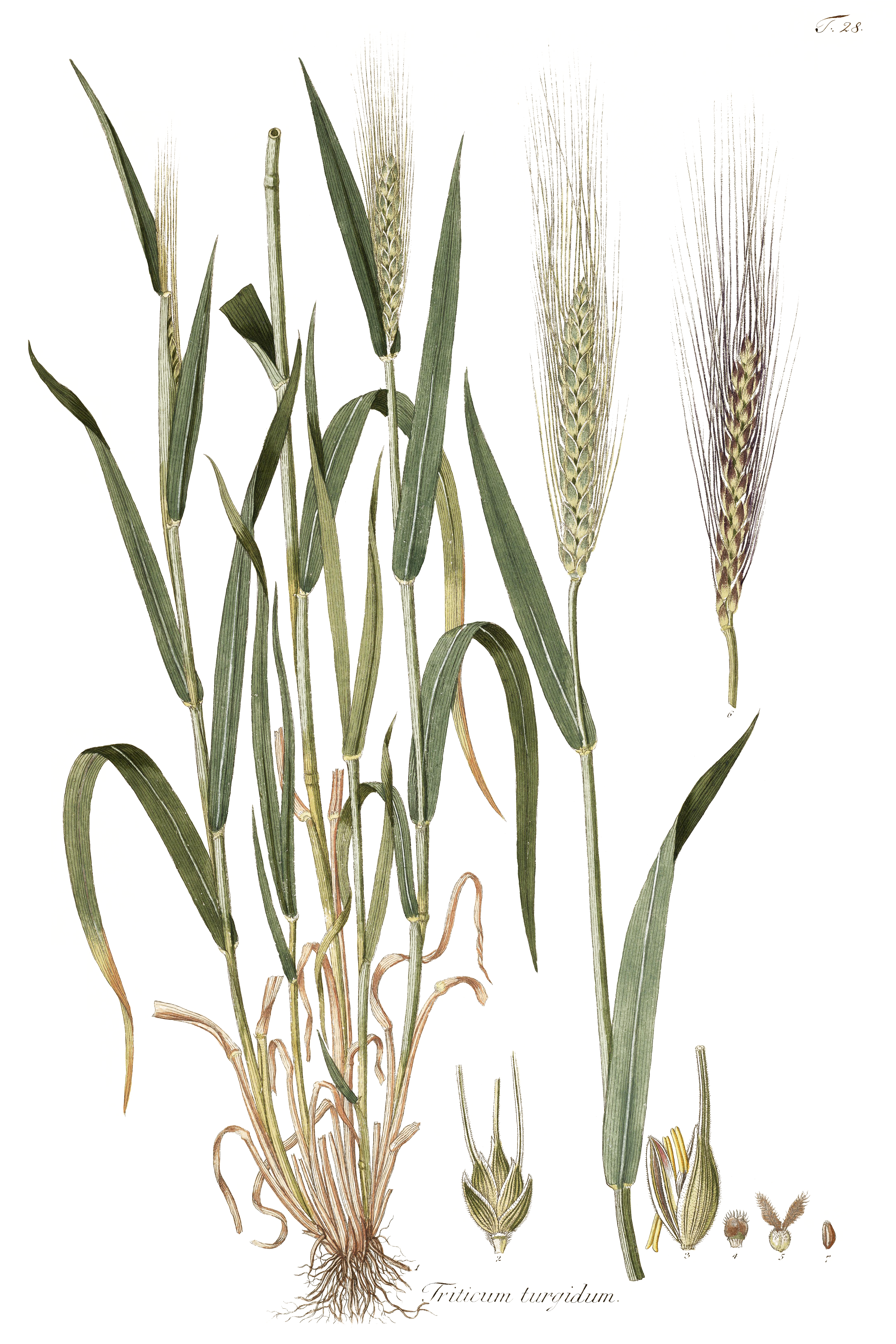
Emmer wheat
Triticum turgidum subsp. dicoccum

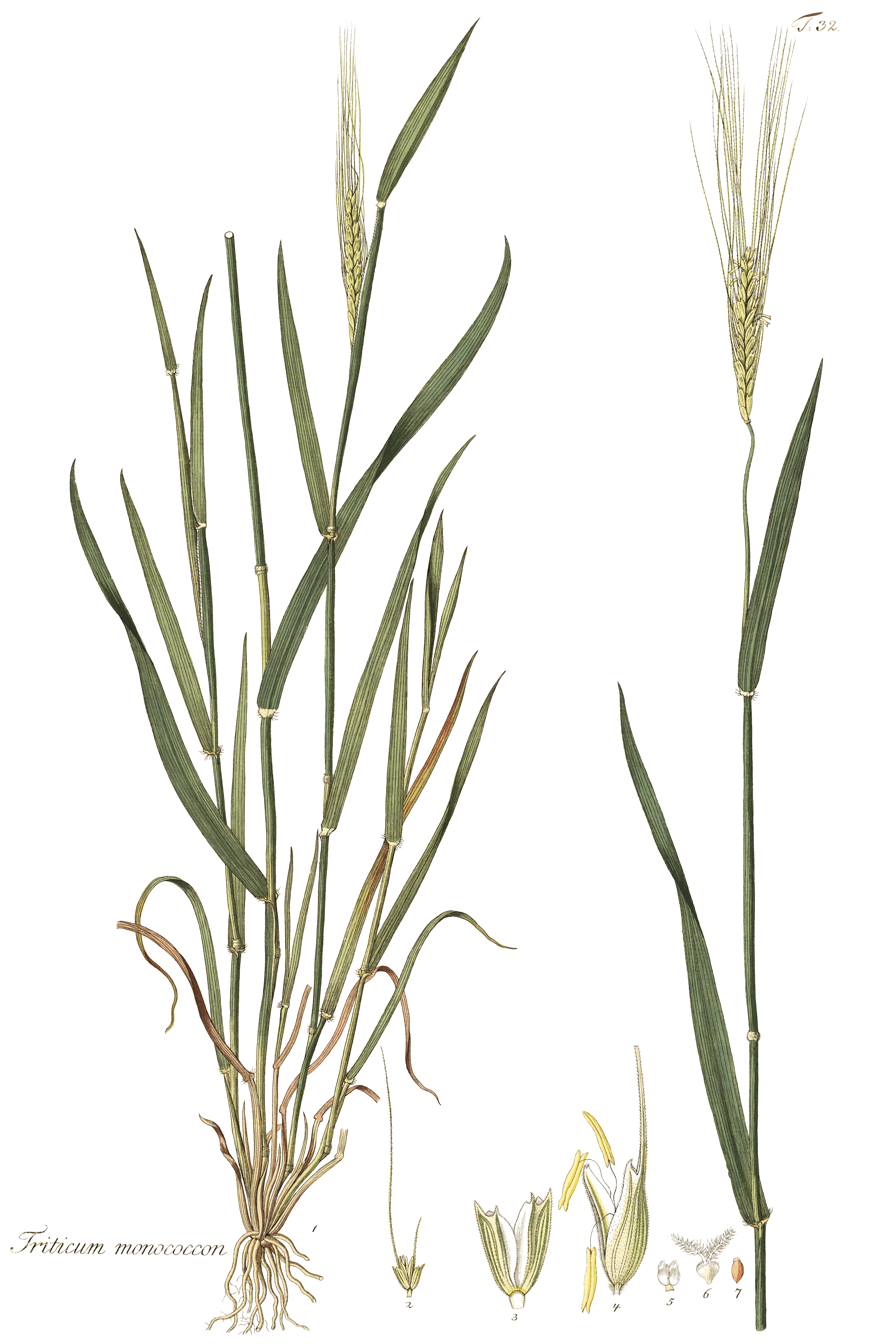
Einkorn wheat
Triticum monococcum

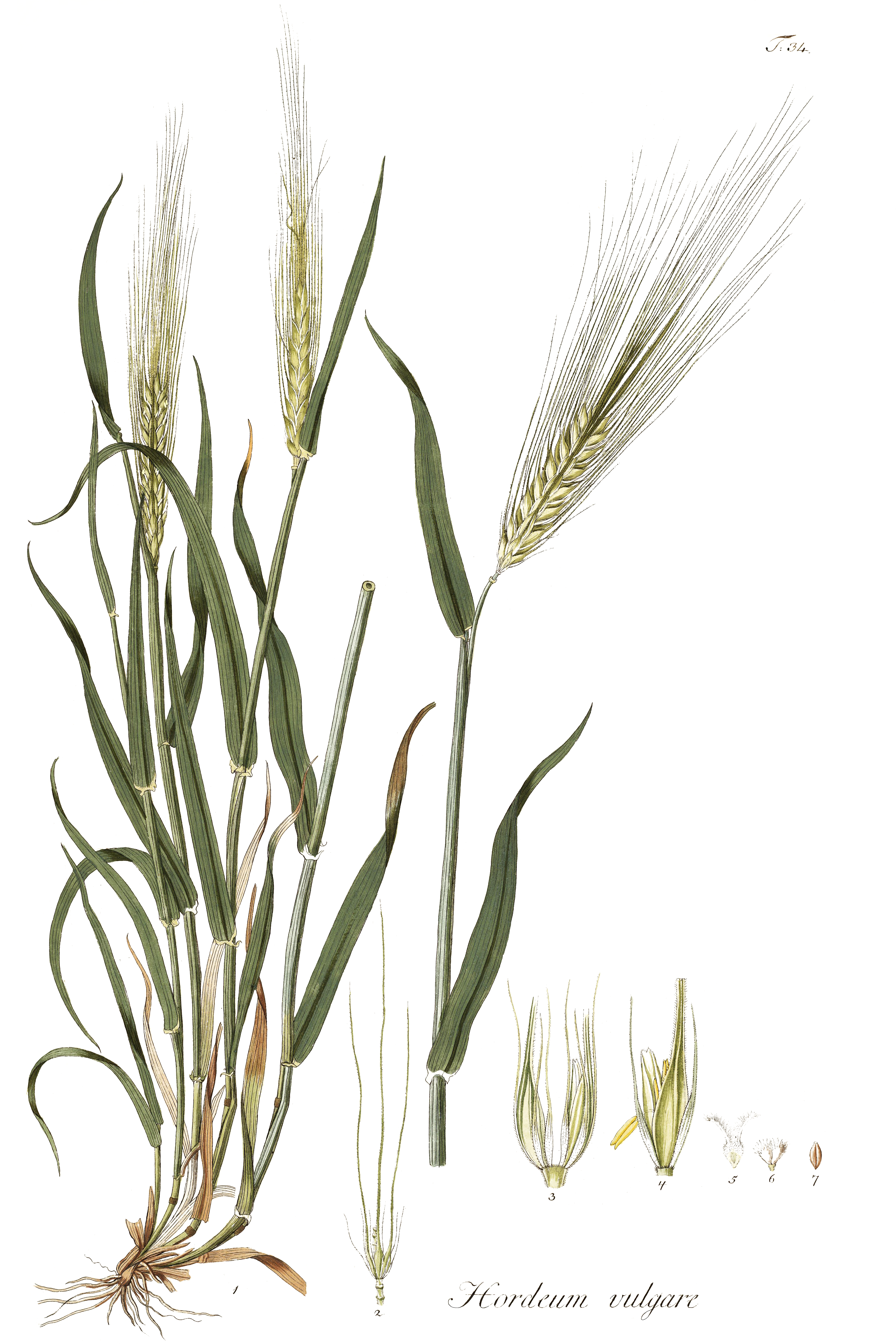
Barley
Hordeum vulgare

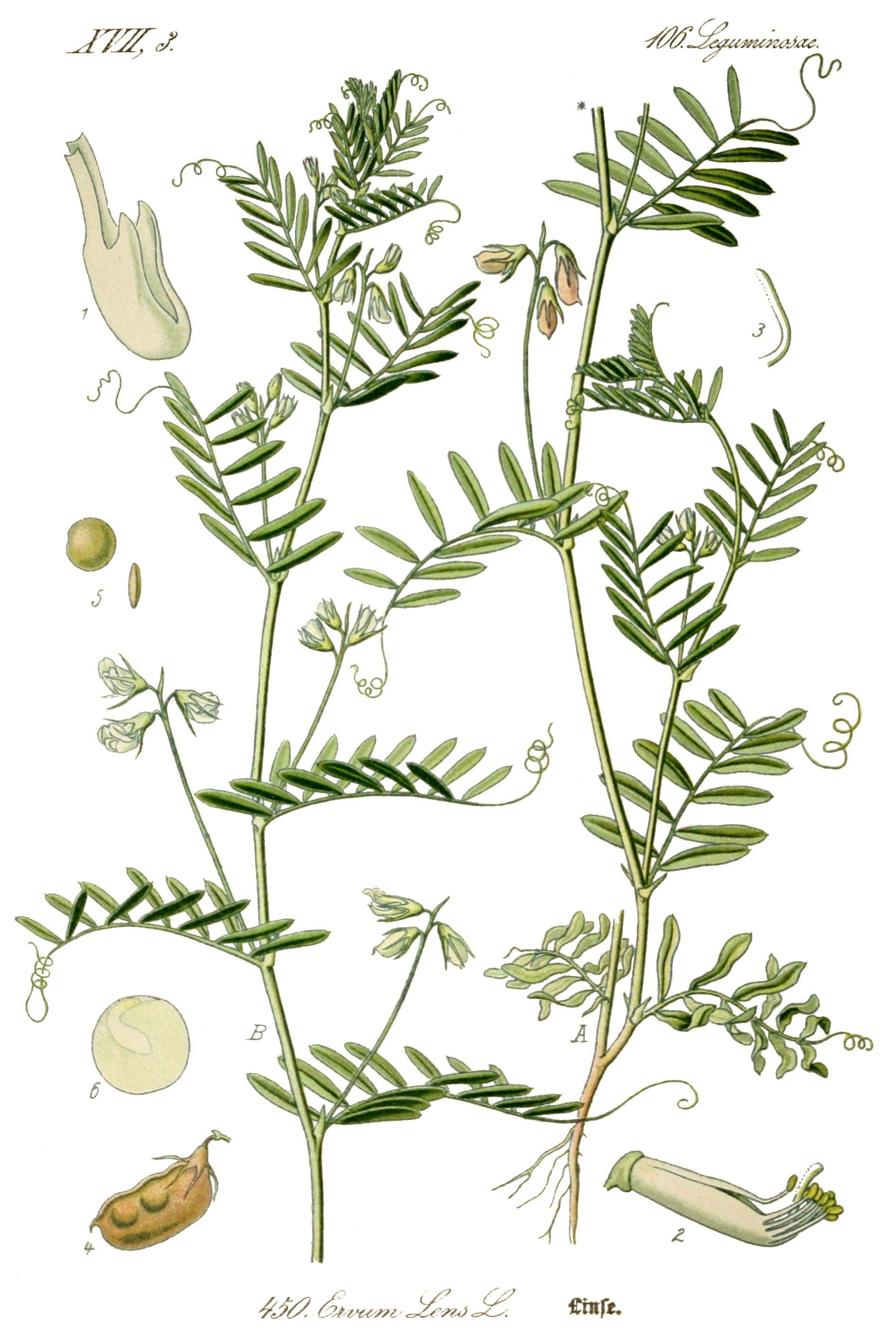
Lentil
Lens culinaris

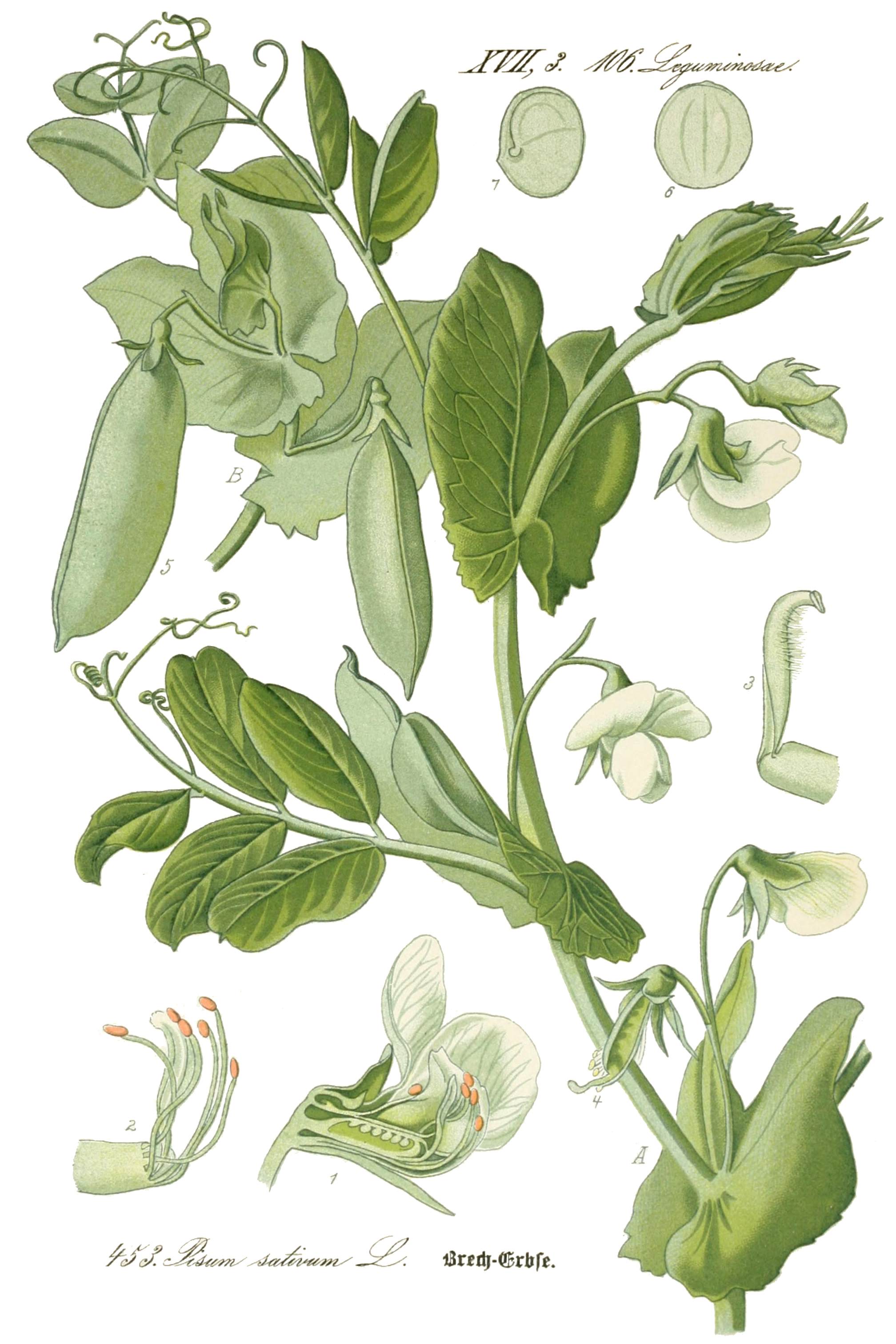
Pea
Pisum sativum

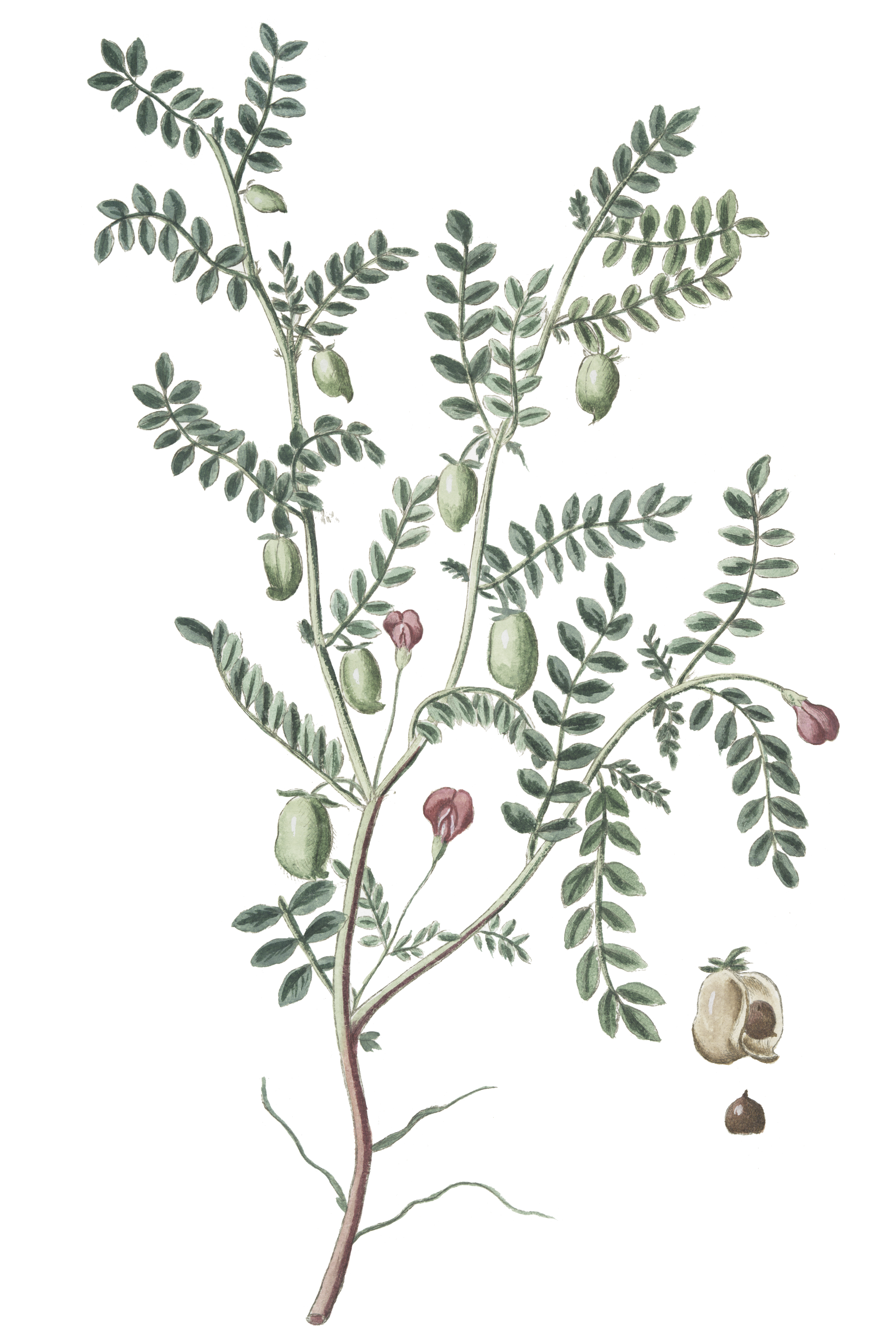
Chickpea
Cicer arietinum

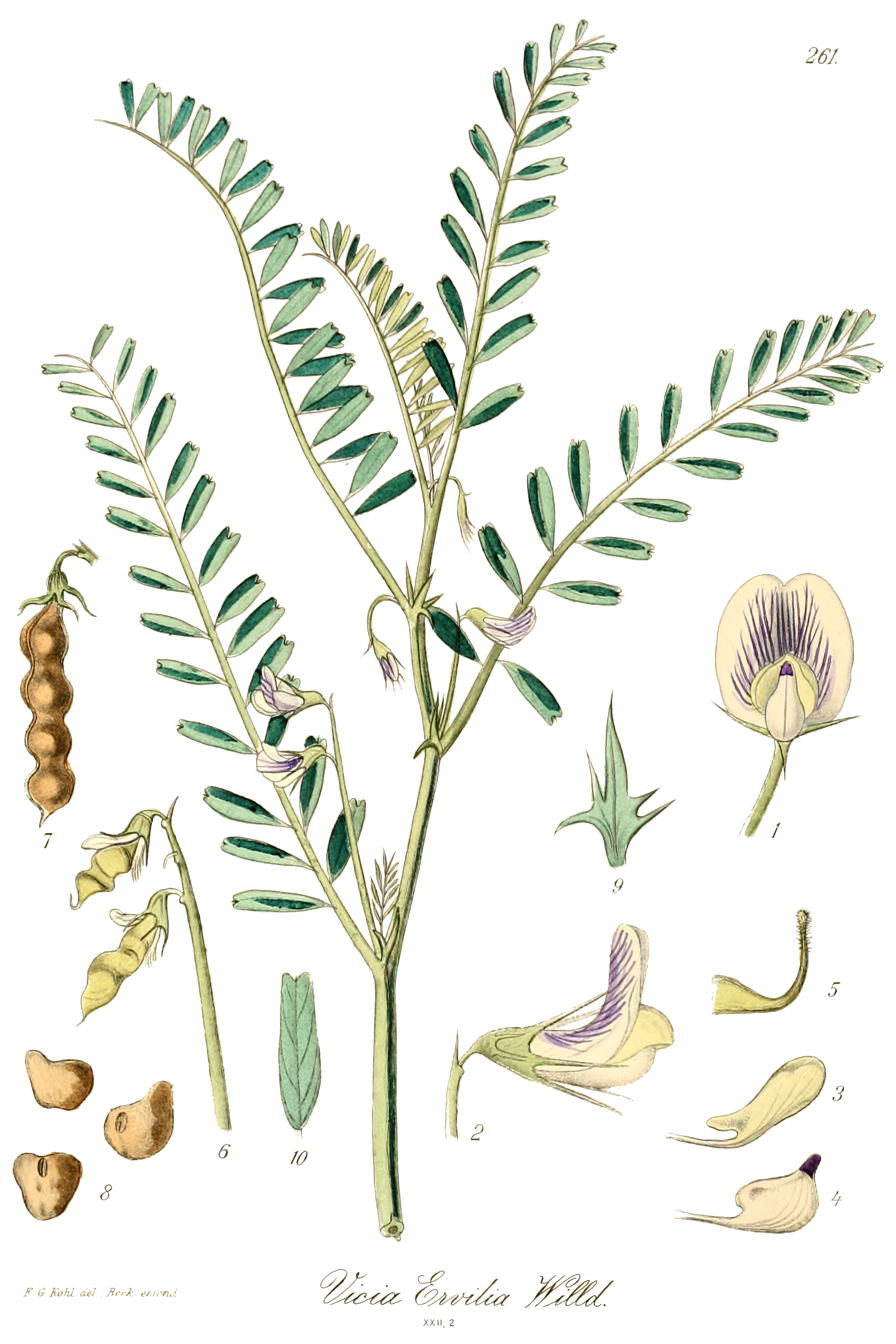
Bitter vetch
Vicia ervilia

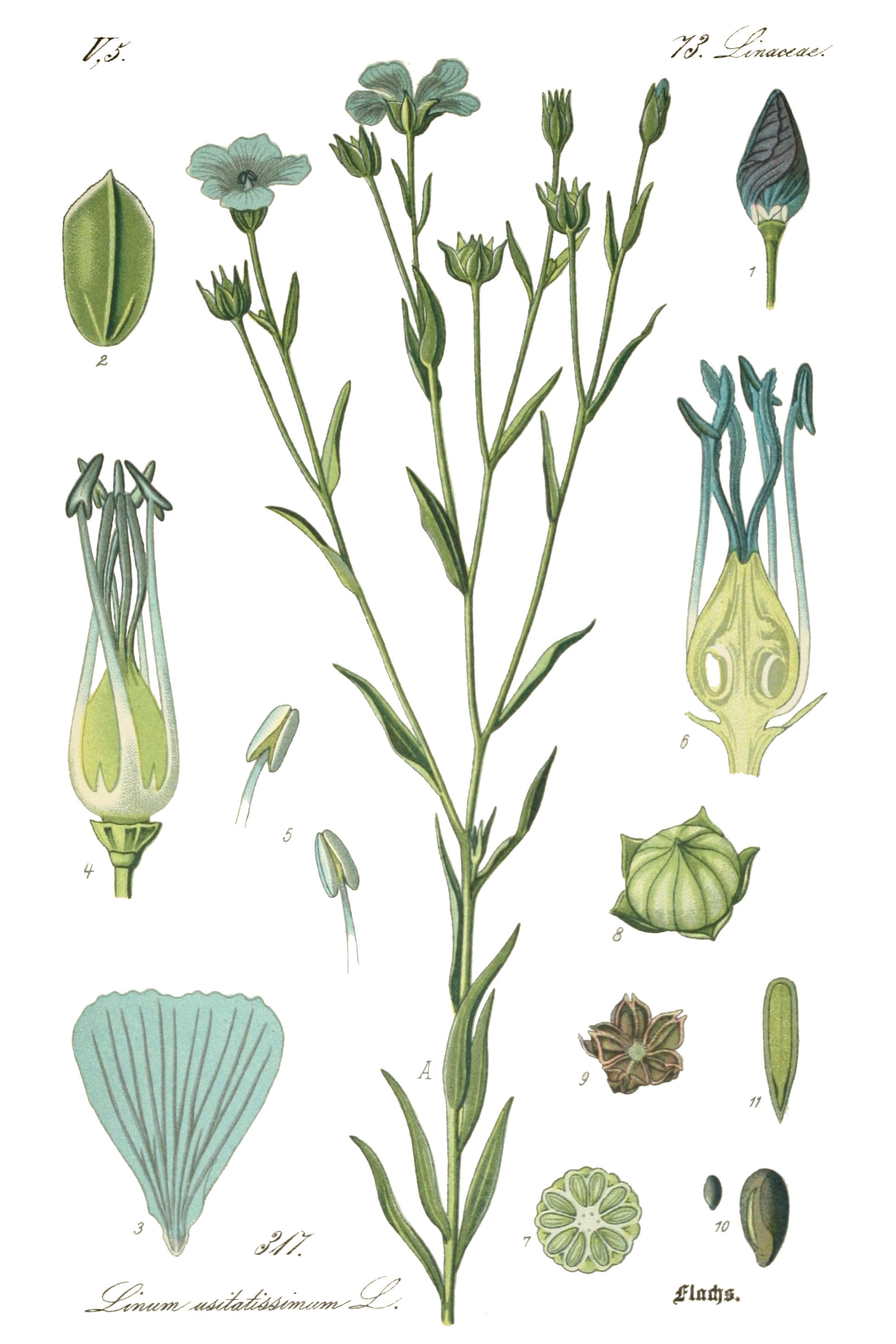
Flax
Linum usitatissimum

The founder crops or primary domesticates are a group of flowering plants that were domesticated by early farming communities in West Asia and went on to form the basis of agricultural economies across Eurasia. As originally defined by Daniel Zohary and Maria Hopf, they consisted of three cereals (emmer wheat, einkorn wheat, and barley), four pulses (lentil, pea, chickpea, and bitter vetch), and flax. Subsequent research has indicated that many other species could be considered founder crops. These species were amongst the first domesticated plants in the world.

== Definition ==
In 1988, the Israeli botanist Daniel Zohary and the German botanist Maria Hopf formulated their founder crops hypothesis. They proposed that eight plant species were domesticated by early Neolithic farming communities in West Asia (Fertile Crescent) and went on to form the basis of agricultural economies across much of Eurasia, including Southwest Asia, South Asia, Europe, and North Africa, in a single process. The founder crops consisted of three cereals (emmer wheat, einkorn wheat, and barley), four pulses (lentil, pea, chickpea, and bitter vetch), and flax. They were amongst the first domesticated plants in the world. These founder crops were domesticated in the Pre-Pottery Neolithic period, between 10,500 and 7,500 years ago.

Different species formed the basis of early agricultural economies in other centres of domestication. For example, rice was first cultivated in the Yangtze River basin of East Asia in the early Neolithic. Sorghum was widely cultivated in sub-Saharan Africa during the early Neolithic, while peanuts, squash, and cassava were domesticated in the Americas.

== Domestication ==
All of the so-called founder crops are native to Southwest Asia and were domesticated in the Pre-Pottery Neolithic period. Many other crops were domesticated in West Asia during the Neolithic, as well as elsewhere, independently, in later periods.

=== Cereals ===
The staple crops of Neolithic agriculture were cereals, which could be easily cultivated in open fields, have a high nutritional value, and can be stored for long periods of time. The most important were two species of wheat, namely emmer (Triticum turgidum subsp. dicoccum) and einkorn (Triticum monococcum) and barley (Hordeum vulgare), which were amongst the first species to be domesticated in the world. The wild progenitors of all three crops are self-pollinating, which made them easier to domesticate.

Wild einkorn wheat (Triticum monococcum subsp. boeoticum) grows across Southwest Asia in open parkland and steppe environments. It comprises three distinct races, only one of which, native to Southeast Anatolia, was domesticated. The main feature that distinguishes domestic einkorn from wild is that its ears will not shatter without pressure, making it dependent on humans for dispersal and reproduction. It also tends to have wider grains. Wild einkorn was collected at Epipalaeolithic sites such as Tell Abu Hureyra (c. 12,700–11,000 years ago) and Mureybet (c. 11,800–11,300 years ago), but the earliest archaeological evidence for the domestic form comes from the early Pre-Pottery Neolithic B of southern Turkey, at Çayönü, Cafer Höyük, and possibly Nevalı Çori. Genetic evidence indicates that it was domesticated in multiple places independently.

Wild emmer wheat (Triticum turgidum subsp. dicoccoides) is less widespread than einkorn, favouring the rocky basaltic and limestone soils found in the hilly flanks of the Fertile Crescent. It is also more diverse, with domesticated varieties falling into two major groups: hulled or non-shattering, in which threshing separates the whole spikelet; and free-threshing, where the individual grains are separated. Both varieties probably existed in the Neolithic, but over time free-threshing cultivars became more common. Genetic studies have found that, like einkorn, emmer was domesticated in southeastern Anatolia, but only once. The earliest secure archaeological evidence for domestic emmer comes from the early PPNB levels at Çayönü, c. 10,250–9550 years ago, where distinctive scars on the spikelets indicated that they came from a hulled domestic variety. Slightly earlier finds have been reported from Tell Aswad in Syria, c. 10,500–10,200 years ago, but these were identified using a less reliable method based on grain size.

Wild barley (Hordeum spontaneum) is more widely distributed than either wheat species, growing across the Eastern Mediterranean, Southwest Asia, and as far east as Tibet, but is most common in the Fertile Crescent. Its tolerance for dry conditions and poor soils allows it to thrive in arid steppe and desert environments. Wild barley has two rows of spikelets, hulled grains, and a brittle rachis; domestication produced, successively, non-brittle, naked (hulless), and then six-rowed forms. Genetic evidence indicates that it was first domesticated in the Fertile Crescent, probably in the Levant, though there may have been independent domestication events elsewhere. Wild barley was harvested in Southwest Asia as long as 50,000 years ago at Kebara Cave, and 23,000 years ago at Ohalo II. At Gilgal I, a Pre-Pottery Neolithic A site in Israel dated to c. 11,700–10,550 years ago, archaeologists discovered a large granary containing thousands of wild barley grains, providing direct evidence for the cultivation of a cereal before it was domesticated. The earliest known remains of domesticated two-row barley come from Tell Aswad and are c. 10,200–9,550 years old. Six-rowed barley is first seen at Çatalhöyük, c. 9350–8950 years ago, and naked varieties at Hacılar Höyük, c. 9350–8950 years ago.

=== Pulses ===
- Lentil (Lens culinaris)
- Pea (Pisum sativum)
- Chickpea (Cicer arietinum)
- Bitter vetch (Vicia ervilia)

=== Flax ===
Flax (Linum usitatissimum) was the first species to be domesticated for oil and fibres rather than food. Its wild progenitor was Linum bienne, which can be found from western Europe to the Caucasus. Wild flax fibres were used by humans as early as 30,000 years ago, at Dzudzuana cave in Georgia, but genetic evidence indicates that domestic flax was initially selected for its oil. In Southwest Asia, the oldest known wild linseed comes from Tell Mureibit and is c. 11,800–11,300 years old; thereafter, it is commonly found at Pre-Pottery Neolithic B sites across the region. These remains are thought to represent the collection of seeds for pressing or consumption, since flax fibres are usually harvested before the seeds mature. Domestic flax is distinguished by its non-splitting capsules, larger seeds, higher oil yield, and longer fibres compared to wild varieties. It does not appear in the archaeological record until relatively late, at Tell es-Sultan (Jericho), c. 9900–9550 years ago.

== Cultivation and spread ==
Epipalaeolithic hunter-gatherers harvested the wild ancestors of the "founder crops" for millennia before they were domesticated, perhaps as early as 23,000 years ago, but they formed a minor component of their diets. Even after they were brought under cultivation, the founder crops were not favoured over wild plants, and they were not established as staple foods until the early Pre-Pottery Neolithic B period, c. 10,700–9700 years ago. This phase of "pre-domestication cultivation" lasted at least a thousand years, during which early cultivars were spread around the region and slowly developed the traits that would come to characterise their domesticated forms.

== Other crops ==
The founder crops were not the only species domesticated in West Asia, nor were they necessarily the most important in the Neolithic period. Domesticated rye (Secale cereale) occurs in the final Epipalaeolithic strata at Tell Abu Hureyra (the earliest instance of domesticated plant species), but was not common until the spread of farming into northern Europe several millennia later. Other plants cultivated in the Neolithic include sweet almond and figs.

As of 2018, many scholars disagreed with the "founder notion". In 2012, scholars suggested that there were likely more than just 8 "founder crops", including 16 or 17 different species of cereals and legumes and figs. Larger DNA data sets and better analytical techniques suggest a more complex picture. In 2000, a "new" glume wheat (NGW), a type of cultivated wheat which existed across western Asia and Europe was found in archeological sites of Hungary, then Turkey and in 2023 in Bavaria, Germany.

== See also ==
- List of ancient dishes
