= IWGP =

IWGP may refer to the following:

- the novel series Ikebukuro West Gate Park
- the International Wrestling Grand Prix, the governing body of professional wrestling promotion New Japan Pro Wrestling
- the International Work Group for Palaeoethnobotany
