= Anthony Legge =

British archaeologist and academic

Professor Anthony James Legge ( 6 June 1939 – 4 February 2013). was a British archaeologist and academic, who specialised in zooarchaeology.

After attending the Cambridge High School for Boys, he began work at the Institute of Animal Physiology, Babraham, Cambridge, in the Pig Physiology unit with Dr Lawrence Mount. After National Service, Legge returned to the Babraham Institute, leaving there in 1966 to enter Churchill College, Cambridge, as a mature student. He graduated in 1969, being awarded the college Special Book Prize for merit. Legge then joined Eric Higgs' research group at Cambridge investigating the early origins of agriculture, where he specialised in archaeofaunal analysis. He worked on the animal remains from Nahal Oren, and from Tell Abu Hureyra in Syria, which was to become a lifelong project. After working with Higgs until 1974, Legge was appointed to the University of London Department of Continuing Education, soon to become part of Birkbeck College. Legge was appointed as Professor of Environmental Archaeology there in 2002.

Work on Tell Abu Hureyra has shown that this is one of the few sites where the process of plant and animal domestication can be followed in detail, and is the only such site dug with modern methods with abundant samples of the organic remains needed in such investigations (see also Gordon Hillman). The first volume of this work has been published.

Legge was also involved in archaeological faunal analyses in Britain, Cyprus, Spain, Serbia, and Croatia, in each region seeking to follow the nature of animal domestication there.

At Grimes Graves in England, he studied the animal bones from two Bronze Age middens, where the inhabitants kept cattle, some sheep and a few pigs, and from these remains, he identified an intensive form of dairy husbandry. This finding was based on herd structure and on the frequency of cull of the young cattle. This interpretation stimulated some controversy in 1981, though more recent work on milk residues in Neolithic and Bronze Age pottery shows that this form of husbandry was indeed widespread in European prehistory. Work in Spain at a Bronze Age farming site also showed evidence for dairy husbandry there, but also with evidence for extensive hunting and trade in furs, skins, and other organic materials. Legge worked with Peter Rowley-Conwy on a re-analysis of the animal remains from the Mesolithic site of Star Carr in England, their work showing that human settlement at that site was in summer rather than in winter as was first proposed, and re-interpreting the hunting activities there.

Legge was a Senior Fellow in the MacDonald Institute for Archeological Research at Cambridge, where he continued to work on material from Tell Abu Hureyra, and Tell el Amarna in Egypt (with Professor Barry Kemp ) until his death in February 2013.
