= Maria Follieri =

Italian archaeobotanist (1932–2012)

Prof Maria Follieri

Academic work
- Sub-discipline: Archaeobotany, Palaeobotany
- Institutions: Sapienza University of Rome

Maria Follieri (1932–2012) was a pioneering Italian archaeobotanist and held the Chair of Palaeobotany at La Sapienza.

== Early life ==
Follieri was born in Rome in 1932. She studied Natural Sciences at the University La Sapienza, graduating in 1954.

== Career ==
Early work included studies of fossil leaves from a site near Rome.

She lectured at La Sapienza in palaeobotany from 1965 onwards, being appointed Associate Professor in 1980. In 1986, she was promoted to Professor of Botany at the Faculty of Mathematical, Physical and Natural Sciences, before being appointed to the Chair of Palaeobotany in 1991.

Follieri was one of the co-founders of the International Work Group for Palaeoethnobotany in 1966, alongside Maria Hopf and Jane Renfrew. Her research spanned multiple themes, include the study of palaeoeclimate, palaeoethnobotany, and palaeovegetation, and chronologically, from the Quaternary period to the Classical world. She studied the archaeobotanical contents of the sewer of the Colosseum. Follieri was noted as the leading archaeobotanist in Italy in the 1970s.

She retired in 2004. A conference in memory of Follieri was held at La Sapienza in 2013. The 18th conference of the International Workgroup for Palaeoethnobotany is dedicated to the memory of Follieri.

She was sister to the renowned Byzantinist and Paleographer Enrica Follieri.

== Selected publications ==
- Follieri, M. 1967. Vegetational features of some Mindel-Riss and Riss-Würn deposits in Italy and remaining Europe. Review of Palaeobotany and Palynology 2: 261–266.
- Follieri, M. 1974. Wood technology of the Bronze age in Northern Italy. Annali di Botanica 33: 1–9.
- Follieri, M. 1975. Resti vegetali macroscopici nel collettore ovest del Colosseo. Annali di Botanica 34: 123–141.
- Follieri, M. 1977. Classification and phylogeny of living and fossil water ferns of the genus «Azolla». Webbia 31: 97–104.
- Follieri, M., Magri, D., Sadori, L. 1986. Late Pleistocene Zelkova extinction in central Italy. New Phytologist 103(1): 269–273.
- Follieri, M. 1987. L’agriculture des plus anciennes communautés rurales d’Italie. In J. C. Guillaine & J.-L. Roudil (eds.), Premiers Communautes Paysannes en Mediteranee Occidentale (pp. 243–247). CNRS éditions.
- Follieri, M. 2010. Conifer extinction in Quaternary Italian records. Quaternary International 225 (1):37–43.
