= Debby Banham =

English medieval social historian

Academic background
- Education: Newnham College, Cambridge

Academic work
- Discipline: Early Medieval English social history
- Sub-discipline: Food production, diet, medicine, sign language
- Institutions: Birkbeck, University of London; Department of Anglo-Saxon, Norse and Celtic

Debby Banham is a British historian of early medieval England, specialising in food production, diet, and medicine. She has published on Anglo-Saxon farming and food and drink, as well as on medieval sign language.

== Biography ==
After having worked as an agricultural labourer, Banham received a Diploma in Advanced Education from the University of Nottingham and her PhD from Newnham College, Cambridge. In 1987, she and Jane Renfrew instigated the creation of an Anglo-Saxon Herb Garden at Lucy Cavendish College, Cambridge.

Until 2018, she taught palaeography, Latin, and Anglo-Saxon history at Birkbeck College, London. She has also been a lecturer at Queen Mary University of London.

She returned to Newnham College in 2007 as Special Supervisor in Anglo-Saxon, Norse and Celtic. Her other roles at the University of Cambridge have included Affiliated Lecturer in Palaeography and Anglo-Saxon History in the Department of Anglo-Saxon, Norse and Celtic; Affiliated Lecturer in the Department of History and Philosophy of Science; Director of Studies at Lucy Cavendish and Murray Edwards Colleges; and Assistant Tutor and Postgraduate Mentor at Newnham College.

She has been a research associate at the Cambridge Wellcome Unit for the History of Medicine and the Thorndike and Kibre project, and worked with Martha Bayless on the Early English Bread Project.

She has been honoured with a panel at the 2018 Leeds International Medieval Congress and a festschrift, Cultivating the Earth, Nurturing the Body and Soul: Daily Life in Early Medieval England (2025).

== Select publications ==
- Banham, Debby; Faith, Rosamond (2014). Anglo-Saxon Farms and Farming. Oxford University Press. ISBN 978-0-19-920794-7.
- Banham, Debby (2004). Food and Drink in Anglo-Saxon England. Tempus. ISBN 978-0-7524-2909-0.
- Banham, Debby (1991). Monasteriales Indicia: The Anglo-Saxon Monastic Sign Language. Anglo-Saxon Books. ISBN 978-0-9516209-4-6.
