= Andrew M. T. Moore =

Andrew Michael Tangye Moore, also known as A. M. T. Moore, is a British archaeologist and academic. He is a professor at the Rochester Institute of Technology (RIT).

== Early life ==
Andrew Moore was born in Devon, England. He read Modern History at the University of Oxford and in 1966 he joined Kathleen Kenyon's excavation in Jerusalem. From 1967 to 1969, he did postgraduate studies at the University of London under John Evans. He then undertook postgraduate research at the University of Oxford. He completed his Doctor of Philosophy (DPhil) degree in 1978 with a doctoral thesis entitled The Neolithic of the Levant. His supervisor was Dame Kathleen Kenyon.

== Academic career ==
He is currently director of the Abu Hureyra site and current president of the Archaeological Institute of America.

From 2000 to 2007, Moore served as the Dean of the College of Liberal Arts at Rochester Institute of Technology (RIT). Since 2007 he has been Dean of Graduate Studies at RIT.

In 2020, he joined the Comet Research Group and collaborated with them on research that reported high concentrations of iridium, platinum, nickel, and cobalt at the Younger Dryas boundary in material from Abu Hureyra. They concluded that the evidence supports the Younger Dryas impact hypothesis, which has been comprehensively refuted by experts in archaeology, astronomy, and impact science.

== Publications ==
- Moore, Andrew M. T., Hillman, Gordon C., and Legge, Anthony J. (2000). Village on the Euphrates: From Foraging to Farming at Abu Hureyra. 585 pages. Oxford University Press. ISBN 978-0-19-510806-4.
