= Hopf =

Hopf is a German surname. Notable people with the surname include:

- Eberhard Hopf (1902–1983), Austrian mathematician
- Hans Hopf (1916–1993), German tenor
- Heinz Hopf (1894–1971), German mathematician
- Heinz Hopf (actor) (1934–2001), Swedish actor
- Ludwig Hopf (1884–1939), German physicist
- Maria Hopf (1914-2008), German botanist and archaeologist
