= International Work Group for Palaeoethnobotany =

- Formation: 1968
- Website: https://archaeobotany.org/

The International Work Group for Palaeoethnobotany (IWGP) is an informal, international collective of archaeobotanists, with the main goal of establishing and maintaining international communication and collaboration by a series of conferences. These conferences focus mainly, but not exclusively, on the study of plant macrofossils in order to reconstruct past subsistence, trade, construction, ritual, and the environment.

== Origins ==
The idea of an international group focussed on human-plant interactions originated at the 7th International Congress of Prehistoric and Protohistoric Sciences in 1966, by the researchers Maria Hopf, Klaus-Dieter Jäger, Maria Follieri, Emanuel Opravil, Zdeněk Tempír, Árpád Patay, and Jane Renfrew, in discussion with Fatih Khafizovich Bakhteev, Moisej Markovič Jakubziner, and Willem van Zeist.

The first meeting in 1968 consisted of 12 people and took place at Kačina, near Prague. The meeting was termed the Internationale Arbeitsgemeinschaft für Paläoethnobotanik (IAP). The second meeting took place in Budapest in 1971. The name “International Work Group of Palaeoethnobotany (IWGP)” was adopted in 1983 in Groningen. The IWGP was partly founded in order to enable the compilation of archaeobotanical data, partly as a means of establishing and maintaining an international research network.

== Organisation ==
The IWGP conferences take place triennially. Papers from the conferences were initially published in book form, including Plants and Ancient Man in 1984 and Old World Palaeoethnobotany in 1991. In 1992 the journal Vegetation History and Archaeobotany was founded and became the location for publication of papers emanating from the IWGP conference series. The conferences are usually organized as geographical or methodological themed sessions. Recent conferences have occurred at the Muséum national d'Histoire naturelle Paris in 2016, the Aristotle University of Thessaloniki in 2013, and Wilhelmshaven in 2010. The IWGP is overseen a by an international committee of archaeobotanists, including Naomi Miller, Amy Bogaard, and Dorian Fuller.

Major achievements are considered as Jürgen Schultze-Motel’s international literature indices, which was continued by Helmut Kroll, which is now the online database ArchBotLit.

Another core achievement was 1991’s publication “Progress in Old World Palaeoethnobotany. A retrospective view on the occasion of 20 years of the International Work Group for Palaeoethnobotany“, edited by Willem van Zeist, Krystyna Wasylikowa, and Karl-Ernst Behre, and published by A. A. Balkema.

== Previous Conferences ==
- 19th Conference of the IWGP in České Budějovice 2022
- 18th Conference of the IWGP in Lecce 2019
- 17th Conference of the IWGP in Paris 2016
- 16th Conference of the IWGP in Thessaloniki 2013
- 15th Conference of the IWGP in Wilhelmshaven 2010
- 14th Conference of the IWGP in Kraków 2007
- 13th Conference of the IWGP in Girona 2004
- 12th Conference of the IWGP in Sheffield 2001
- 11th Conference of the IWGP in Toulouse 1998
- 10th Conference of the IWGP in Innsbruck 1995
- 9th Conference of the IWGP in Kiel 1992
- 8th Conference of the IWGP in Nitra-Nové Vozokany 1989
- 7th Conference of the IWGP in Cambridge 1986
- 6th Conference of the IWGP in Groningen 1983
- 5th Conference of the IWGP in Halle/Saale 1980
- 4th Conference of the IWGP in Wilhelmshaven 1977
- 3rd Conference of the IWGP in Kraków 1974
- 2. Symposium der IAP in Budapest 1971
- 1. Symposium der IAP in Kačina 1968

== Journal ==
The IWGP publishes the journal Vegetation History and Archaeobotany with Springer. The current editor-in-chief is Felix Bittman.
