= Svatý Mikuláš =

- Municipality
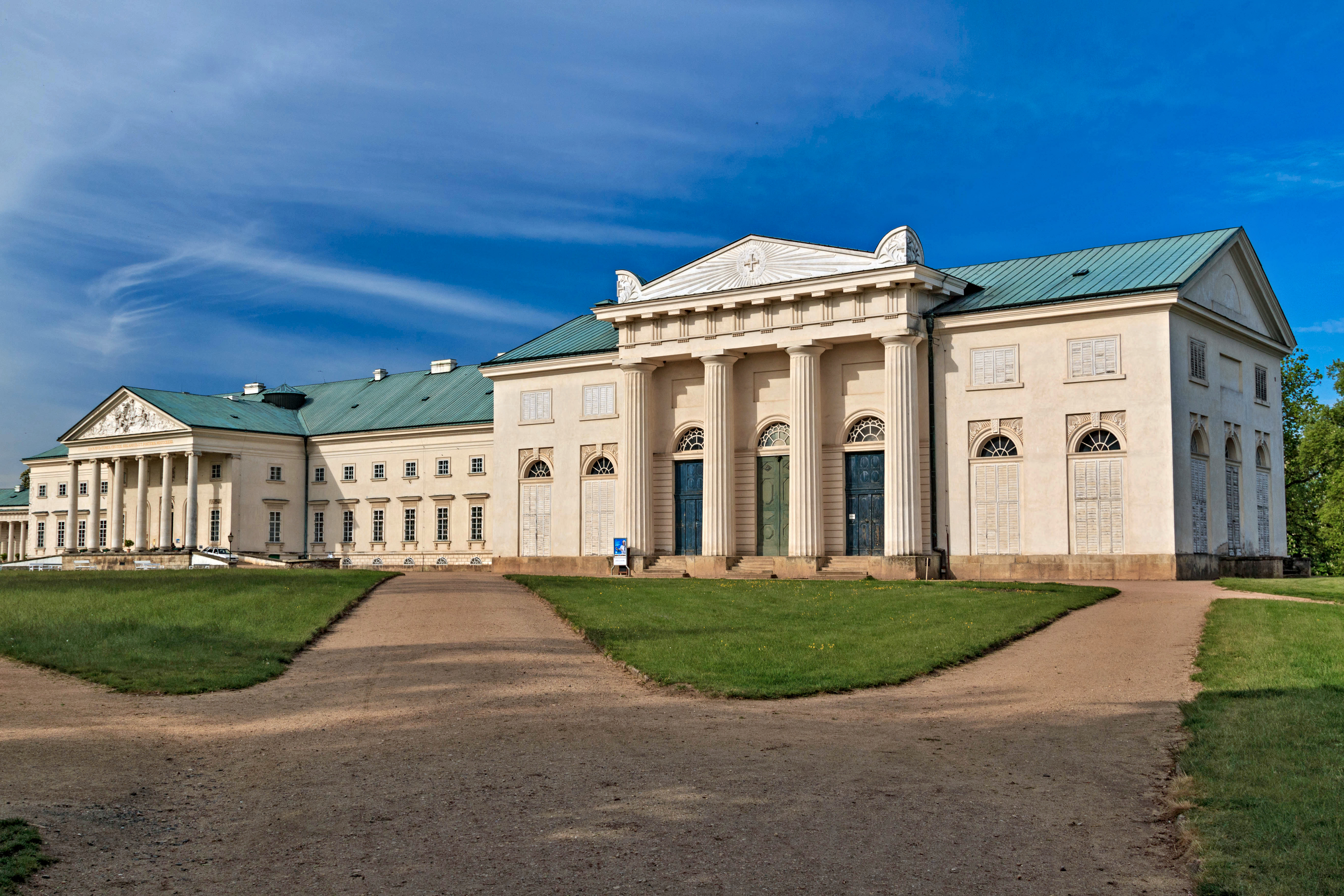
- Kačina Castle

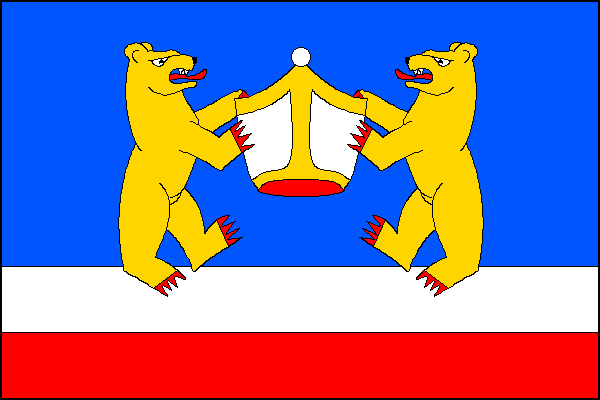
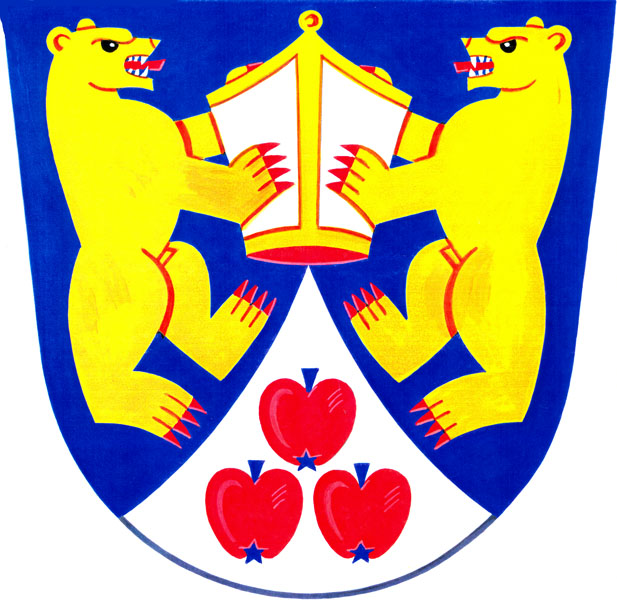
- Flag Coat of arms

- Location in the Czech Republic
- Coordinates: 49°59′27″N 15°21′2″E
- Country: Czech Republic
- Region: Central Bohemian
- District: Kutná Hora
- First mentioned: 1307

Area
  - Total: 17.83 km^{2} (6.88 sq mi)
- Elevation: 206 m (676 ft)

Population (2026-01-01)
  - Total: 1,016
  - Density: 56.98/km^{2} (147.6/sq mi)
- Time zone: UTC+1 (CET)
  - Summer (DST): UTC+2 (CEST)
- Postal codes: 284 01
- Website: www.svatymikulas.cz

Svatý Mikuláš is a municipality and village in Kutná Hora District in the Central Bohemian Region of the Czech Republic. It has about 1,000 inhabitants. Svatý Mikuláš is known for the Kačina Castle, which is protected as a national cultural monument.

== Administrative division ==
Svatý Mikuláš consists of four municipal parts (in brackets population according to the 2021 census):

- Svatý Mikuláš (443)
- Lišice (36)
- Sulovice (104)
- Svatá Kateřina (298)

Lišice and Sulovice form an exclave of the municipal territory.

== Etymology ==
The name means 'Saint Nicholas' in Czech.

== Geography ==
Svatý Mikuláš is located about 6 kilometres (4 mi) northeast of Kutná Hora and 30 km (19 mi) west of Pardubice. It lies mostly in the Central Elbe Table. A small part of the Lišice-Sulovice exclave extends into the Iron Mountains and includes the highest point of Svatý Mikuláš at 301 m (988 ft) above sea level. The Elbe River briefly flows through the northern part of the municipal territory. The Doubrava River flows between the main part of the municipality and the exclave, briefly entering the exclave.

== History ==
The first written mention of Svatý Mikuláš is from 1307.

== Demographics ==
Historical population

Year	Pop.	±%
1869	1,636	—
1880	1,636	+0.0%
1890	1,735	+6.1%
1900	1,711	−1.4%
1910	1,690	−1.2%

Year	Pop.	±%
1921	1,672	−1.1%
1930	1,598	−4.4%
1950	1,137	−28.8%
1961	1,070	−5.9%
1970	987	−7.8%

Year	Pop.	±%
1980	886	−10.2%
1991	797	−10.0%
2001	722	−9.4%
2011	790	+9.4%
2021	881	+11.5%

Source: Censuses

== Transport ==
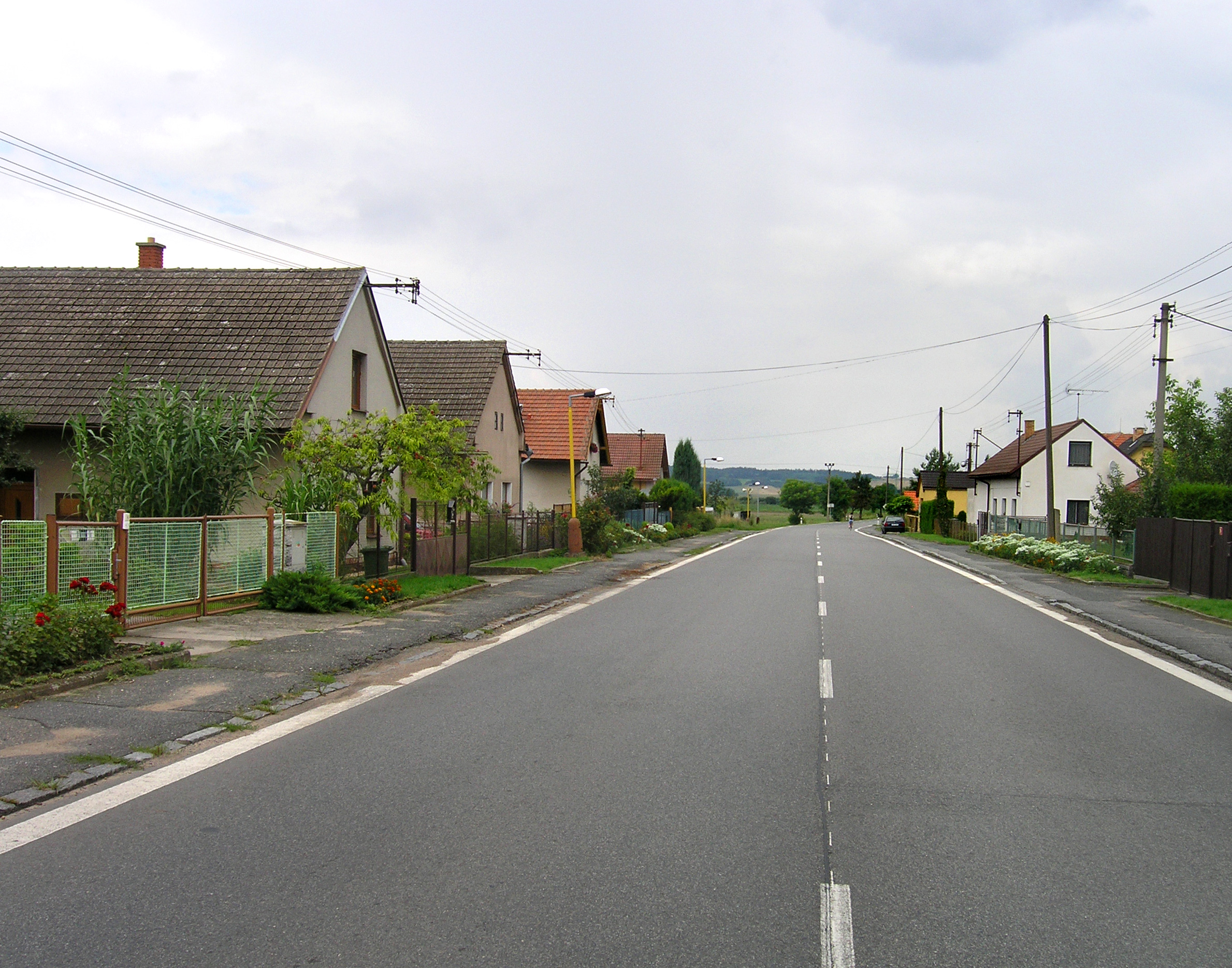
Main road

The I/2 road (the section from Kutná Hora to Pardubice) runs through the municipality.

== Sights ==
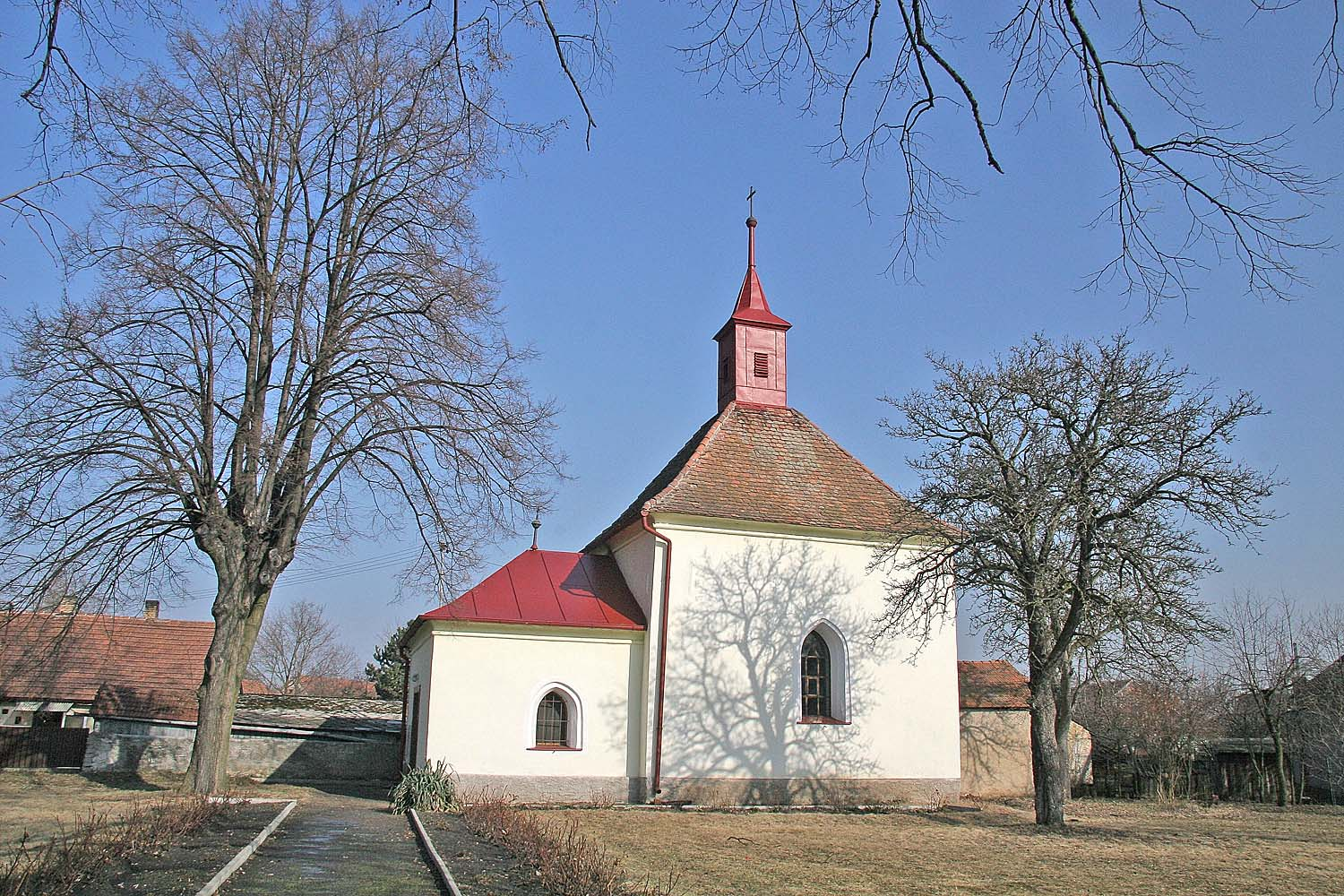
Church of Saint Nicholas

Svatý Mikuláš is known for the Kačina Castle, protected as a national cultural monument. It is considered the most important Czech building in the Empire style. It was built in 1802–1823 and consists of three parts, the main building and two wings. Today it is used by National Museum of Agriculture, which opened here the Czech Countryside Museum. In the left wing is a never-finished castle chapel and a castle theatre completed in the middle of the 19th century. In the right wing is the Chotek Library with more than 40,000 volumes of educational and beautiful literature from the 16th–19th centuries.

The Church of Saint Nicholas probably dates from the turn of the 13th and 14th centuries. It is a Gothic church with neo-Gothic modifications from 1872.
