= Gordon Hillman =

British archaeobotanist and academic

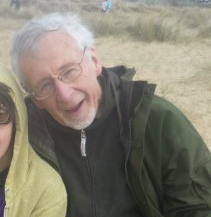
- Gordon Hillman
- Born: 20 July 1943; Hailsham, England
- Died: 1 July 2018 (aged 74); Hailsham, England
- Education: University of Reading
- Awards: Distinguished Economic Botanist, 2004
- Scientific career
- Fields: Archaeobotany
- Workplaces: British Institute of Archaeology at Ankara Cardiff University University College London

Gordon Hillman (20 July 1943 – 1 July 2018) was a British archaeobotanist and academic at the UCL Institute of Archaeology. He has been described as "a pivotal figure in the development of archaeobotany at the Institute of Archaeology at University College London, [who] through his research, publications and teaching had a major influence on the field worldwide."

== Early life and education ==
Hillman was born in Hailsham, East Sussex to Joyce (née Connett) and Albert Hillman on 20 July 1943. He was interested in plants from an early age; his father owned Knights, a local plant nursery. After leaving school, he worked as a field studies assistant at Alston Moor, Cumbria, and then at the Natural History Museum in London from 1960 to 1965.

After studying agricultural botany at Reading University, in 1969 he went to Mainz in Germany to study archaeobotany with Maria Hopf.

== Fieldwork ==
Hillman's research was underpinned by long periods of botanical and archaeological fieldwork. His first excavation (1969–70) was the Pre-Pottery Neolithic B site of Can Hasan III on the Konya Plain of central Turkey, where large-scale flotation recovered early domesticated plants, including rye. From 1970-73 Hillman joined the excavations at the Aşvan Project, on the Murat river in eastern Turkey. This was a pioneering multi-disciplinary excavation of four sites around the village of Aşvan, led by David French and involving a wide range of specialists, including those from anthropology, geography, zoology and botany. Here Hillman implemented a large-scale flotation system for the second time, and carried out the ethnoarchaeological work on crop-processing that has been so influential in Old World archaeobotany.

In 1972-3 Hillman joined the excavations at Abu Hureyra directed by Andrew M. T. Moore. Again, large-scale flotation was applied, resulting in the retrieval of over 500 litres of plant remains; the study of these formed the main subject of Hillman's research for much of the next 25 years. Seeds and herbarium specimens collected in the vicinity of these excavations in Syria and Turkey formed the basis of Hillman's large seed reference collection, today divided between the British Institute at Ankara and the UCL Institute of Archaeology. Subsequent field trips followed, with a focus on the ecology of wild cereals, to eastern Turkey and Syria in 1983 with Professor David R. Harris, and to eastern Turkey in 1992 with Harris and Professor Daniel Zohary.

Hillman's final fieldwork was to initiate archaeobotany at the Neolithic site of Jeitun, Turkmenistan, in 1989, 1990 and 1992.

== Academic career ==
Hillman's first post after study in Germany was as research fellow at the British Institute of Archaeology at Ankara (now the British Institute at Ankara), where a short-term stint of fieldwork turned into a stay from 1969 to 1975. The intended doctoral dissertation with Maria Hopf was never completed, and Hillman never acquired a doctoral degree. From 1975 to 1981 he was a part-time lecturer at the University of Wales, Cardiff (now Cardiff University) and part-time archaeobotanist for the Welsh archaeological trusts. In 1981 he was head-hunted to the Institute of Archaeology, University of London (now part of University College London), by David Harris, the Institute's Professor of Human Environment. At the Institute of Archaeology he held the post of Lecturer in Archaeobotany, then Reader, then Visiting Professor having retired early in 1997 on grounds of ill health.

Hillman and Harris formed an effective team, most notably in fieldwork in Syria and Turkmenistan, and in organising the conference session at the Southampton World Archaeological Congress of 1986 that led to the publication of Foraging and farming: the evolution of plant exploitation in 1989. Hillman's reputation had spread worldwide by the 1980s, reflected in the geographical diversity of plant remains and students coming to the Institute. Students were also attracted by his enthusiasm and kindness. Something of the atmosphere of that period is conveyed in the introduction to Hillman's Festschrift volume: "Anyone exiting the third floor lift in the Institute of Archaeology in the 1980s and 1990s would have been confronted with the sight of Gordon's office, at times shared with up to three other colleagues and crammed full of books, cereal sheaves and reaping hooks, with at least 1-3 students and visiting colleagues, taking full advantage of his good nature, deep knowledge and awful coffee."

== Research ==
Hillman's contributions to understanding of ancient diet and food procurement were in five areas:

=== Archaeobotanical methodology ===
In the early 1970s Hillman recognised that traditional crop-processing in the mostly unmechanised village of Asvan led to distinctive, consistent assemblages of crop seeds, chaff and weed seeds that could also be recognised in archaeobotanical samples. Contemporary analysis of archaeobotanical samples by Robin Dennell and others had recognised this variation, with the implication that ancient seed assemblages could not be treated uncritically as representative of crop use, but had not identified the close association with crop processing stages. Further fieldwork by Glynis Jones in Greece put Hillman's results onto a firmly quantified basis, and this mode of interpretation of plant remains - in terms of crop processing stages such as winnowing and sieving - is now a standard component of archaeobotany, particularly in the Old World. Many of Hillman's students carried out ethnoarchaeological work, for example Sarah Mason and Mark Nesbitt in Turkey, Catherine D'Andrea and Ann Butler in Ethiopia, and Leonor Peña-Chocarro and Lydia Zapata in Spain and Morocco. Other scholars acknowledge his influence, for example in work on wild foods in Turkey by Füsun Ertuğ, and on crop-processing in India by S.N. Reddy.

Hillman stressed the importance of first-hand knowledge of the ecology of wild food plants: "...perhaps... for too many years, we in archaeology have imagined that we could somehow research events of considerable ecological complexity - such as those surrounding the inception of cultivation - without ever needing to come to grips with the ecological detail". The results of his botanical fieldwork were most fully explored for the site of Abu Hureyra, for which his 1996 paper and 2000 book make extensive use of current day plant distribution to model the availability of wild cereals and other foodstuffs in the Epipalaeolithic period. Hillman also carried out experimental harvesting of wild cereals, leading to highly influential work with the geneticist Stuart Davies on modelling the potential speed of wheat domestication. They concluded that selective pressures meant that morphological domestication in the form of loss rachis fragility could occur within 200 generations, thus 200 years for this annual crop. Current interpretations of archaeological data by Dorian Fuller and others point instead to a prolonged process of domestication; nonetheless the debate is framed by the evolutionary theory and field data set out by Hillman and Davies.

Difficulty in identifying the fragmented plant remains characteristic of early sites led Hillman to build an excellent seed reference collection. His identification guides often circulated in handwritten and drawn form. They were most influential with regard to wheat identification, playing an important part in the development in the 1980s of reliable criteria for identification of wheat chaff, particularly separation of tetraploid and hexaploid free-threshing wheat rachises. Working with his students, Hillman explored a wide range of identification techniques including tuber and wood anatomy, infra-red spectroscopy and other forms of chemical analysis. and morphological criteria.

=== Origins of agriculture in southwest Asia ===
The plant remains from Abu Hureyra, Syria, remain central to any research into the beginnings of farming in southwest Asia. The eight metres of occupation debris spanning about 4000 years of human occupation spans the period during which cultivation of wild cereals and when their domestication is thought to have occurred. The broad picture of plant exploitation is clear: in the Epipalaeolithic (Natufian) levels (phase Abu Hureyra 1) seeds of about 200 wild plant species are present, with about 20 of these as staples, representing a diverse, foraged diet. In the PPNB village (phase Abu Hureyra 2), the plant remains are dominated by 7-8 domesticated plants, including barley and emmer wheat. Other aspects remain hotly debated, particularly with regard to explanation of the causes of this shift in subsistence. Views of the dating of the site and its plant remains are divergent. Radiocarbon dating indicates a Natufian level occupied for c. 1000 years between c. 13,100 to 12,000 calendar years before present (years BP), and a PPNB level dating from 10,000–9300 years BP. However, the final excavation report proposed continuous occupation on the basis of the distribution of radiocarbon dates, and also proposed the presence of domesticated rye grains in the Natufian period; both propositions are disputed. It has been suggested by Naomi Miller that the diverse wild seeds of the Natufian period may derive from burning of dung in the relatively little forested area of the Syrian steppe; Hillman and colleagues countered with the difficulty of collecting dung from wild animals. The extent to which the wild flora of pre-agrarian sites represents food remains is likewise debated at other archaeological sites of this period.

The nature and cause of changes in plant use in relation to climate are also debated. Hillman originally proposed that wild food plants such as wild einkorn were foraged, in other words, collected from the wild. However, following detailed ecological modelling, Hillman and Moore proposed instead that the wild cereals had been under cultivation, probably in response to desiccation caused by the Younger Dryas climate event at about 12,900 to c. 11,700 years BP. Connolly and Colledge propose instead that the observed shift in plant consumption to less desirable foodstuffs at Abu Hureyra 1 simply reflects the greater scarcity of wild cereals under the effects of the cooler, drier Younger Dryas climate. In wider context, wild cereal and legume cultivation is widely accepted as likely at PPNA sites (11,600-10,500 years BP), but is not generally accepted for Epipalaeolithic sites.

Reinterpretation of the Abu Hureyra plant remains will continue, both as new archaeobotanical data and theory arises from new excavations, and will be accelerated in the event of further analysis of the Abu Hureyra assemblages. The final publication summarises the results by seed density; it is likely that full quantification and renewed identification efforts will lead to fresh views.

=== Hunter-gatherer diet ===
Hillman had a strong interest in hunter-gatherer diet independent of agricultural origins. Aside from Abu Hureyra, he also studied plant remains from the Palaeolithic site of Wadi Kubbaniya in Egypt, dating to c. 18000 calendar years BP and rich in tuber remains. Seeds previously identified as domesticated cereal grains were shown to be mis-identified or intrusive from later layers. With his student Sarah Mason he also studied plant remains from Dolní Věstonice II in the Czech Republic, dating to about 26,000 radiocarbon years BP. The assemblage included seeds and tubers. Hillman often cited ethnographic studies of hunter-gatherers, often from North America, but also (using his fluent Turkish, Russian and German) from obscure European sources too. In last 20 years, post-retirement, reconstructing the potential foraging diet of pre-agrarian Britain became Hillman's main project, in part carried out with Ray Mears, the bushcraft instructor. Incorporating copious experiments in processing to remove toxicity and improve taste, and extensive use of ethnographic and archaeobotanical data, the resulting plant profiles are currently being edited and released by colleagues at UCL.

=== Ancient agriculture ===
Hillman worked on material from many agricultural sites, including Can Hasan III and the Asvan project in Turkey, the PPNB layers of Abu Hureyra in Syria, Mycenae in Greece, and numerous sites in Wales. These were not the main focus of his later work, and most of these remain to be fully published, with the exception of the PPNB layers of Abu Hureyra, studied by Dominique de Moulins, and the Asvan sites studied by Jennifer Bates and Mark Nesbitt. Important material such as the rye finds from Can Hasan III was published in interim reports. Many of Hillman's other students worked on agrarian sites; for the Near East these included Mike Charles in Iraq, and Sue Colledge in Syria.

=== Food remains ===
Two sets of archaeological food remains sparked Hillman's wider interest in ancient food. The stomach contents of Lindow Man, who was excavated in 1984, date to the Iron Age about 2000 years ago. Analysis by Hillman's student Tim Holden found that his last meal was a coarse wheat and barley griddle bread. At Wadi Kubbaniya Hillman observed human coprolites containing seeds. He also collaborated with food scientists Tony Leeds and Peter Ellis at King's College London, leading to nutritional analyses of acorns and sea club-rush (Bolboschoenus maritimus) tubers.

== Impact ==
Despite taking early retirement in his mid-fifties, Hillman published over 80 papers (many very long), two co-authored books (Village on the Euphrates. From foraging to farming at Abu Hureyra, 2000; Wild food, 2007), and one co-edited book (Foraging and farming: the evolution of plant exploitation, 1989). He had a major influence on the research infrastructure of archaeobotany, creating large reference collections at the British Institute at Ankara and the Institute of Archaeology, and his reputation raised the profile and credibility of archaeobotany during the critical period of its growth in the 1980s. The Institute of Archaeology remains a major centre for archaeobotanical research. Arguably, his greatest impact was manifested through his students, who extended his approach to other time periods and other parts of the world, and are now in senior positions worldwide. In addition to his impact on the field of archaeobotany, Hillman was also highly influential in popularising foraging of wild plant foods through his work with Ray Mears.

== Honours ==
In 2004 Hillman was awarded the Distinguished Economic Botanist award by the Society for Economic Botany. In 2009 former students and colleagues presented Hillman with a Festschrift, From Foragers to Farmers: Papers in Honour of Gordon C. Hillman.

== In popular culture ==
He became well known on UK television via his work with Ray Mears on the BBC programme Wild Food broadcast in 2007. In conjunction with Mears he wrote a book to accompany the series also called 'Wild Food' and published by Hodder & Stoughton. These looked at strategies for the gathering, processing and storage of wild plants that were likely to have been available in aboriginal, (hunter-gatherer) Britain.

== Personal life ==
Hillman was briefly married to Wendy MacInnes, and is survived by their daughter and three grandsons. He suffered from Parkinson's disease and died on 1 July 2018.

== Key publications ==
- Hillman, G. C. (1978). "On the origins of domestic rye – Secale cereale: the finds from aceramic Can Hasan III in Turkey". Anatolian Studies. 28: 157–174. doi:10.2307/3642748. JSTOR 3642748. S2CID 85225244.
- Hillman, G. C. (1981) Reconstructing crop husbandry practices from charred remains of crops. In R. Mercer (ed.) Farming practice in British prehistory, 123–162. Edinburgh, Edinburgh University Press.
- Hillman, G. C. (1982) Evidence for spelting malt. In R. Leech (ed.) Excavations at Catsgore 1970–1973: a Romano-British village, 137–141. Bristol, Western Archaeological Trust, Excavation Monograph 2.
- Hillman, G. C. (1984) Interpretation of archaeological plant remains: the application of ethnographic models from Turkey. In W. van Zeist and W. A. Casparie (ed.) Plants and ancient man. Studies in palaeoethnobotany, 1–41. Rotterdam, A.A. Balkema.
- Hillman, G. C. (1984) Traditional husbandry and processing of archaic cereals in modern times. Part I, the glume-wheats. Bulletin on Sumerian Agriculture 1, 114–152.
- Hillman, G. C. (1985) Traditional husbandry and processing of archaic cereals in modern times. Part II, the free-threshing cereals. Bulletin on Sumerian Agriculture 2, 1–31.
- Hillman, G. C. (1986) Plant foods in ancient diet: the archaeological role of palaeofaeces in general and Lindow Man's gut contents in particular. In I. M. Stead, J. B. Bourke and D. Brothwell (ed.) Lindow Man: the body in the bog, 99–115, 198–202. London, British Museum.
- Davies, M. S.; Hillman, G. C. (1988). "Effects of soil flooding on growth and grain yield of populations of tetraploid and hexaploid species of wheat". Annals of Botany. 62 (6): 597–604. doi:10.1093/oxfordjournals.aob.a087699.
- Harris, D. R. and Hillman, G. C. (1989) Foraging and farming: The evolution of plant exploitation. London, Unwin Hyman, One World Archaeology 13.
- Hillman, G. C., Madeyska, E. and Hather, J. (1989) Wild plant foods and diet at Late Paleolithic Wadi Kubbaniya: the evidence from charred remains. In F. Wendorf, R. Schild and A. E. Close (ed.) The prehistory of Wadi Kubbaniya. Volume 2. Stratigraphy, paleoeconomy, and environment, 162–242. Dallas, TX, Southern Methodist University Press.
- Hillman, G. C.; Davies, M. S. (1990). "Measured domestication rates in wild wheats and barley under primitive cultivation, and their archaeological implications". Journal of World Prehistory. 4 (2): 157–222. doi:10.1007/bf00974763. S2CID 84752567.
- Hillman, G. C. (1996) Late Pleistocene changes in wild plant-foods available to hunter-gatherers of the northern Fertile Crescent: possible preludes to cereal cultivation. In D. R. Harris (ed.) The origins and spread of agriculture and pastoralism in Eurasia, 159–203. London, UCL Press.
- Moore, A. M. T., Hillman, G. C. and Legge, A. J. (2000) Village on the Euphrates: from foraging to farming at Abu Hureyra. New York, Oxford University Press.
- Hillman, G. C.; Hedges, R.; Moore, A.; Colledge, S.; Pettitt, P. (2001). "New evidence of Lateglacial cereal cultivation at Abu Hureyra on the Euphrates". The Holocene. 11 (4): 383–393. Bibcode:2001Holoc..11..383H. doi:10.1191/095968301678302823. S2CID 84930632.
- Mason, S. L. R., Hather, J. G. and Hillman, G. C. (2002) The archaeobotany of European hunter-gatherers: some preliminary investigations. In S. L. R. Mason and J. G. Hather (ed.) Hunter-gatherer archaeobotany, 188–196. London, Institute of Archaeology, University College London.
- Hillman, G. C. (2003) Investigating the start of cultivation in western Eurasia: studies of plant remains from Abu Hureyra on the Euphrates. In A. J. Ammerman and P. Biagi (ed.) The widening harvest: the Neolithic transition in Europe: looking back, looking forward, 75–97. Boston, MA, Archaeological Institute of America.
- Fairbairn, A.; Martinoli, D.; Butler, A.; Hillman, G. C. (2006). "Wild plant seed storage at Neolithic Çatalhöyük East, Turkey". Vegetation History and Archaeobotany. 16 (6): 467–479. doi:10.1007/s00334-006-0069-3. S2CID 128552545.
- Mears, R. and Hillman, G. C. (2007) Wild food. London, Hodder & Stoughton.
- Wollstonecroft, M., Ellis, P. R., Hillman, G. C. and Fuller, D. Q. (2008) Advances in plant food processing in the Near Eastern Epipalaeolithic and implications for improved edibility and nutrient bioaccessibility: an experimental assessment of Bolboschoenus maritimus (L.) Palla (sea club-rush). Vegetation History and Archaeobotany 17, Supplement 1, 19–27.
- Nesbitt, M., Bates, J., Hillman, G. & Mitchell, S. (2017). The Archaeobotany of Aşvan: Environment & Cultivation in Eastern Anatolia from the Chalcolithic to the Medieval Period. London: British Institute at Ankara, Monograph 33.
