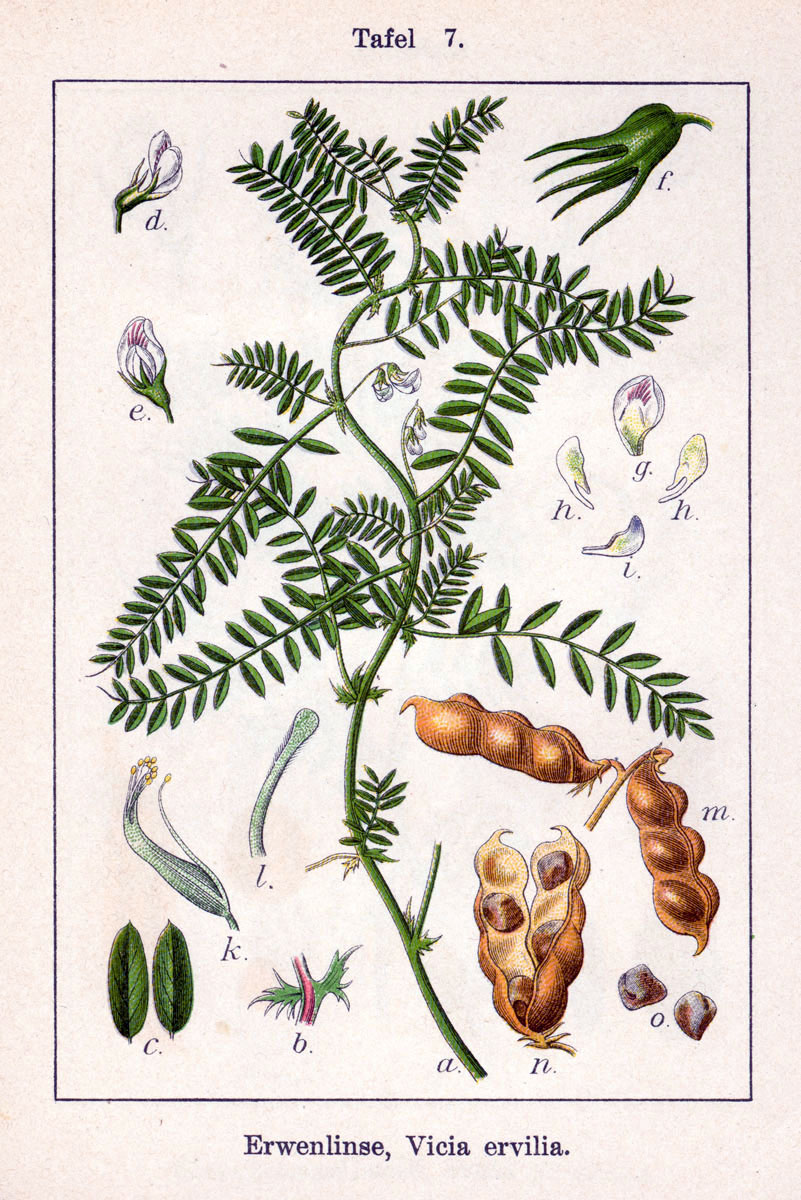

Conservation status
- Least Concern (IUCN 3.1)

Scientific classification
- Kingdom: Plantae
- Clade: Embryophytes
- Clade: Tracheophytes
- Clade: Angiosperms
- Clade: Eudicots
- Clade: Rosids
- Order: Fabales
- Family: Fabaceae
- Subfamily: Faboideae
- Tribe: Fabeae
- Genus: Vicia
- Species: V. ervilia

Binomial name
- Vicia ervilia (L.) Willd.

Synonyms
- Ervum ervilia L.; Ervum plicatum Moench; Vicia ervilla Medik.; Ervilia sativa Link; Rhynchium plicatum Dulac; Lens pygmaea Grossh.

= Vicia ervilia =

Bitter vetch

Species of ancient Mediterranean legume crop

Vicia ervilia, called ervil or bitter vetch, is an ancient legume crop of the Mediterranean region. Besides the English names, other common names include: gavdaneh (Persian), kersannah (Arabic), yero (Spanish), rovi (Greek), burçak (Turkish), and karshinim (Hebrew).

== Description ==
Bitter vetch is an annual plant up to 0.6 metres (2.0 ft) tall. It is insect-pollinated, and like other legumes is able to fix nitrogen. It can tolerate a range of soil types as long as these are moist and well-drained; it does not grow in heavy shade.

== Cultivation ==
The nutritional value of the grain for ruminant cattle has guaranteed the species' continued cultivation in Morocco, Spain and Turkey. The crop is easy to cultivate and harvest and can be grown on very shallow, alkaline soils.

== Distribution ==
The wild strains of bitter vetch are limited to an area that includes Anatolia and northern Iraq, with an extension south along the Anti-Lebanon Mountains of Syria and Lebanon. Traces of the earliest domesticated instances were recovered from several archeological sites in Turkey, with an uncorrected radiocarbon dating of the 7th and 6th millennia BC.

== Uses ==
The grain is an excellent sheep and cattle feed concentrate. It has been held in high esteem by farmers in the Old World since the beginning of agriculture to improve the nutritional value of bulk feeds.

The grain when split resembles red lentils. For human consumption the bitterness of the seeds needs to be removed through leaching by several changes of boiling water. Owing to this bitterness, it is unlikely that someone would accidentally confuse bitter vetch with red lentils. According to Zohary and Hopf, this crop is consumed only by the poorest people or in times of famine.

In ancient Rome, Pliny the Elder stated that bitter vetch (ervum) has medicinal value like vetch (vicia), citing the letters of Augustus where the emperor wrote that he regained his health from a diet of bitter vetch (N.H. 18.38).

The plant is linked with the Talmudic borit karshina, a plant listed in the second century as an ingredient in the incense offerings employed in the Tabernacle and the First and Second Temples in Jerusalem.
