= Enrica Follieri =

Italian university teacher (1926–1999)

Enrica Follieri (5 December 1926 – 11 December 1999) was an Italian philologist and paleographer, who specialized in Byzantine literature and hagiography. She spent her whole academic career at La Sapienza University of Rome.

== Biography ==
Born in Rome in a family of Pugliese origins (her parents were from Foggia), she graduated in Classics from La Sapienza University in 1948, tutored by Byzantinist Silvio Giuseppe Mercati. She immediately became the assistant of Antonio Maria Cervi, then Professor of Classical Philology, and of Mercati, and then also of Ciro Giannelli who succeeded Mercati.

She obtained the habilitation ("libera docenza") in Byzantine philology in 1960 and in Greek Paleography the following year, and became Professor of Greek Paleography at the Scuola Speciale per Archivisti e Bibliotecari (connected to La Sapienza) from 1961 to 1975. In 1976 she applied for the Chairs of Byzantine Philology and Greek Paleography at La Sapienza, winning both; she chose to hold the former, teaching the latter by assignment. At the Scuola Speciale, she was succeeded in 1979 by her pupil Lidia Perria, and at La Sapienza by Guglielmo Cavallo (since 1975 Professor of Latin Paleography, then—from 1978 on—Professor of Greek Paleography).

She retired on 31 October 1999 and died less than two months later in Rome. Her sister was the archaeobotanist Maria Follieri.

== Research ==
Follieri researched Byzantine religious literature, and particularly hagiography. She studied and critically edited homiletic, hagiographic, and religious Byzantine texts, both in prose and in verses. German Byzantinist Vera von Falkenhausen pointed out that more than half of Follieri's works deal with hagiographic matters, but if one considers all the specific passages about hagiography, the percentage raises to 95%.

She also was a skilled paleographer and gave significant contributions to the study of the history of Greek handwriting, particularly focusing on Southern Italian manuscripts and Greek manuscripts in minuscule writing from the IX-X centuries. A very specific punctuation mark, found in several manuscripts of both oriental and Southern Italian origins, was named after her ("chiodo Follieri", i.e. "Follieri nail", due to its shape).

== Works (selection) ==
Enrica Follieri's complete bibliography was published by Luzzi, Andrea (2002). "Bibliografia di Enrica Follieri". Rivista di Studi Bizantini e Neoellenici. Nuova Serie 39: 9–22.

=== Monographs ===
- Follieri, Enrica (1959). Il Teseida neogreco. Libro I. Saggio di edizione. Testi e Studi Bizantini e Neogreci, 1. Athens – Rome: Istituto di Studi Bizantini e Neoellenici.
- Follieri, Enrica, ed. (1960–1965). Initia hymnorum Ecclesiae Graecae. Studi e Testi, 211–215bis. Vol. I–V. Rome: Biblioteca Apostolica Vaticana.
- Follieri, Enrica, ed. (1969). Codices Graeci Bibliothecae Vaticanae selecti, temporum locorumque ordine digesti, commentariis et transcriptionibus instructi. Exempla scripturarum, 4. Vatican City: Biblioteca Apostolica Vaticana.
- Follieri, Enrica; Strunk, Oliver, eds. (1975). Triodium Athoum. Monumenta Musicae Byzantinae, 9. Hauniae: Munksgaard.
- Follieri, Enrica (1980). I Calendari in metro innografico di Cristoforo Mitileneo. Subsidia hagiographica, 63/1–2. Vol. I–II. Bruxelles: Société des Bollandistes.
- Follieri, Enrica (1993). La Vita di san Fantino il Giovane. Introduzione, testo greco, traduzione, commentario e indici. Subsidia hagiographica, 77. Bruxelles: Société des Bollandistes.
- Follieri, Enrica (1997). Acconcia Longo, Augusta; Perria, Lidia; Luzzi, Andrea (eds.). Byzantina et italograeca. Studi di filologia e di paleografia. Storia e Letteratura. Raccolta di studi e testi, 215. Rome: Edizioni di Storia e Letteratura.

=== Research articles ===
- Follieri, Enrica (1949–1950). "Un codice Marciano del Teseida". Atti dell'Accademia di Scienze, Lettere ed Arti di Palermo. Serie IV, 10: 3–16.
- Follieri, Enrica (1953). "La versione in greco volgare del Teseida del Boccaccio". In Mercati, Silvio Giuseppe (ed.). Atti dell'VIII Congresso Internazionale di Studi Bizantini (Palermo, 3-10 aprile 1951). Studi Bizantini e Neoellenici, 7. Vol. I. Rome: Anonima Romana Editoriale. pp. 67–77.
- Follieri, Enrica (1956). "Epigrammi sugli Evangelisti dai codici Barberiniani greci 352 e 520". Bollettino della Badia greca di Grottaferrata. Nuova Serie, 10: 61–80, 135–156.
- Follieri, Enrica (1957). "Un carme giambico in onore di Davide". Studi Bizantini e Neoellenici. 9: 101–116.
- Follieri, Enrica (1959). "Il calendario giambico di Cristoforo di Mitilene secondo i mss. Palat. gr. 383 e Paris. gr. 3041". Analecta Bollandiana. 77: 245–304. doi:10.1484/J.ABOL.4.01932.
- Follieri, Enrica (1961). "Un canone di Giuseppe Innografo per s. Fantino «il Vecchio» di Tauriana". Revue des études byzantines. 19: 130–151.
- Follieri, Enrica (1961). "Un canone inedito per s. Elia Siculo". Bollettino della Badia greca di Grottaferrata. Nuova Serie, 15: 15–29.
- Follieri, Enrica (1961). "Una miscellanea innografica del fondo Basiliano: il codice Vatic. gr. 2110". Bollettino della Badia greca di Grottaferrata. Nuova Serie, 15: 3–14.
- Follieri, Enrica (1962). "La reintroduzione di lettere semionciali nei più antichi manoscritti greci in minuscola". Bullettino dell'Archivio Paleografico Italiano. Serie III, 1: 15–36.
- Follieri, Enrica (1962). "Saba Goto e Saba Stratelata". Analecta Bollandiana. 80 (3–4): 249–307. doi:10.1484/J.ABOL.4.02062.
- Follieri, Enrica (1962). "Un canone inedito di s. Andrea di Creta per l'Annunciazione". Collectanea Vaticana in honorem Anselmi M. Card. Albareda a Bybl. Apostolica edita. Studi e Testi, 219. Vatican City: Biblioteca Apostolica Vaticana. pp. 337–357.
- Follieri, Enrica (1962). "Un Theotocarion Marciano del sec. XIV (cod. Marciano cl. I, 6)". Archivio italiano per la storia della pietà. 3: 37–278.
- Follieri, Enrica; Dujčev, Ivan (1963). "Un'acolutia inedita per i Martiri di Bulgaria dell'anno 813". Byzantion. 33 (1): 71–106. JSTOR 44169072.
- Follieri, Enrica (1964). "Il calendario in forma di canone di Teodosio Calociro". Mélanges Eugène Tisserant. Studi e Testi, 232. Vol. II. Vatican City: Biblioteca Apostolica Vaticana. pp. 103–169.
- Follieri, Enrica (1964). "L'ordine dei versi in alcuni epigrammi bizantini". Byzantion. 34 (2): 447–467. JSTOR 44169975.
- Follieri, Enrica (1964). "Le poesie di Cristoforo Mitileneo come fonte storica". Zbornik Radova Vizantološkog Instituta. 8 (2): 133–148. hdl:21.15107/rcub_dais_8905.
- Follieri, Enrica; Dujčev, Ivan (1964). "Il calendario in sticheri di Cristoforo di Mitilene". Byzantinoslavica. 25: 1–36 – via Knihovna Akademie věd ČR.
- Follieri, Enrica (1965). "Un reliquiario bizantino di s. Simeone stilita". Byzantion. 35 (1): 62–82. JSTOR 44169149.
- Follieri, Enrica (1965–1966). "Vite ed inni greci per i santi di Ravenna". Rivista di studi bizantini e neoellenici. Nuova serie, 2–3: 193–203.
- Follieri, Enrica (1966). "Alcune reliquie dell'omiletica italo-greca". Byzantino-Sicula. Istituto Siciliano di Studi Bizantini e Neoellenici. Quaderni, 2. Palermo: Istituto Siciliano di Studi Bizantini e Neoellenici. pp. 18–21.
- Follieri, Enrica (1966). "Il calendario in forma di canone di Gregorio Monaco". Revue des études byzantines. 24: 115–152.
- Follieri, Enrica (1968). "Giovanni Mauropode metropolita di Eucaita, Otto Canoni paracletici a N.S. Gesù Cristo". Archivio italiano per la storia della pietà. 5: 1–200.
- Follieri, Enrica (1971). "Santa Trifena di Cizico". Analecta Bollandiana. 89 (3–4): 343–362. doi:10.1484/J.ABOL.4.02912.
- Follieri, Enrica (1971). "Santi di Metone: Atanasio vescovo, Leone taumaturgo". Byzantion. 41: 378–451. JSTOR 44170323.
- Follieri, Enrica (1971). "Un segno di interpunzione in lezionari italo-greci". XIVe Congrès international des études byzantines (Bucarest, 6-12 septembre 1971). Bucuresti: Editura Academiei Republicii Socialiste Romania. p. 176.
- Follieri, Enrica (1973–1974). "Un codice di Areta troppo a buon mercato: il Vat. Urb. gr. 35". Archeologia Classica. 25–26: 262–79. JSTOR 44366167.
- Follieri, Enrica (1974). "Tommaso di Damasco e l'antica minuscola libraria greca". Rendiconti dell'Accademia dei Lincei. Classe di Scienze Morali, Storiche e Filologiche. Serie VII, 29: 1–19.
- Follieri, Enrica (1977). "Ciriaco ὁ μελαῖος". Bijdragen ... aangeboden aan Prof. Dr. Emile de Strijcker. Antwerpen – Utrecht: De nederlandsche Boekhandel. pp. 502–28.
- Follieri, Enrica (1977). "Il libro greco per i Greci nelle imprese editoriali veneziane della prima metà del Cinquecento". Venezia centro di mediazione tra Oriente e Occidente. Secoli XV-XVI. Aspetti e problemi. Atti del II Convegno internazionale di storia della civiltà veneziana (Venezia, 3-6 ottobre 1963). Fondazione Giorgio Cini - Civiltà veneziana. Studi, 32. Firenze: Leo S. Olschki. pp. 483–508.
- Follieri, Enrica (1977). "La minuscola libraria dei secoli IX–X". La paléographie grecque et byzantine. Paris, 21–25 octobre 1974. Paris: Éditions du C.N.R.S. pp. 139–53.
- Follieri, Enrica (1979). "Due codici greci già cassinesi oggi alla Biblioteca Vaticana: gli Ott. gr. 250 e 251". Palaeographica Diplomatica et Archivistica. Studi in onore di Giulio Battelli. Fondazione Giorgio Cini - Civiltà veneziana. Studi, 32. Vol. I. Rome: Edizioni di Storia e Letteratura. pp. 159–221.
- Follieri, Enrica (1991–1992). "Ancora una nota sul Christus patiens". Byzantinische Zeitschrift. 84–85: 343–346.
- Follieri, Enrica (1994). "Kυριώνυμος". Jahrbuch der österreichischen Byzantinistik. 44: 83–89.
- Follieri, Enrica (1994). "Iota mutum: ripristino o eliminazione in alcuni testi bizantini". Rivista di cultura classica e medioevale. 36: 271–280.
