= Naomi Miller =

Archaeobotanist

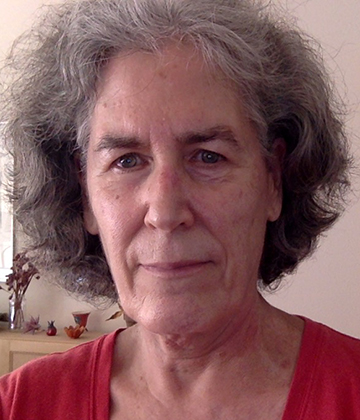

Academic background
- Education: University of Michigan
- Thesis: Economy and Environment of Malyan, A Third Millennium B.C. Urban Center in Southern Iran

Academic work
- Discipline: Archaeology
- Sub-discipline: Archaeobotany

Naomi Miller is an archaeobotanist who works in western and central Asia. Miller is based at the University of Pennsylvania.

== Biography ==
Miller completed her Ph.D. dissertation in 1982 in the Department of Anthropology, University of Michigan on archaeobotanical evidence for the economy and environment of third millennium BC Malyan in southern Iran.

Miller specializes in the study of charred plant remains from Neolithic and Bronze Age sites in western and central Asia. In the early 1980s, Miller identified animal dung as a source for charred plant remains at sites in the Near East had a major impact on the interpretation of archaeobotanical assemblages. She also works with researchers at Gordion, Turkey to use native vegetation to preserve the archaeological site.

She has edited several volumes, including a collection of essays in honour of William Sumner, and a volume on the archaeological evidence for plant cultivation with Kathryn Gleason.

The Penn Museum was originally criticized by the archaeological community for laying off Miller along with 17 other researchers in 2008, before clarifying they would find other funding sources to support scholars such as Miller. Miller is currently a consulting scholar with the Near East Section of the University of Pennsylvania Museum, and adjunct associate professor with the department of anthropology. Since 2009 Miller has been associated with the Institute for the Study of the Ancient World, New York University.

Miller is a committee member of the International Work Group for Palaeoethnobotany, and was awarded the 2017 Fryxell Award for Interdisciplinary Research in Archaeology from the Society for American Archaeology. In 2019 an issue of Vegetation History and Archaeobotany was dedicated to Miller. She contributed to the development Penn Museum's new Middle East galleries, which opened in 2018, as part of the curatorial team.

== Selected publications ==
- Miller, Naomi F., Philip Jones, and Holly Pittman. 2016. Sign and image: Representations of plants on the Warka Vase of early Mesopotamia. Origini 39: 53-73
- Miller, N. F., Spengler, R. N. and Frachetti, M. 2016 Millet cultivation across Eurasia: Origins, spread, and the influence of seasonal climate. Holocene 26: 1566-1575.
- Miller, N. 2010 Botanical Aspects of Environment and Economy at Gordion, Turkey. University of Pennsylvania Museum, Philadelphia
- Miller, N. F. 2013 Agropastoralism and archaeobiology: connecting plants, animals and people in West and Central Asia. Environmental Archaeology 18: 247-256.
- Miller, N. F. 2008. Sweeter than wine? The use of the grape in early western Asia. Antiquity 82:937-946.
- Miller, N. F and Abadi, K. 2003.Yeki Nud, Yeki Nabud: Essays on the Archaeology of Iran in Honor of William M. Sumner.
- Miller, N. F. and Gleason, K.L. 1994. The Archaeology of Garden and Field. University of Pennsylvania Press, Philadelphia
- Miller, N. 1991 The Near East. In Progress in Old World Palaeoethnobotany eds. W. van Zeist, K. Wasylikowa, and K.-E. Behre, pp. 133–160. A.A. Balkema, Rotterdam.
- Miller, N. F. 1990. Economy and Settlement in the Near East: Analyses of Ancient Sites and Materials.
- Miller, N. F. 1988. Ratios in palaeoethnobotanical analysis. In C. A. Hastorf & V. S. Popper (Eds.), Current Paleoethnobotany (pp. 72–85). Chicago: University of Chicago.
- Miller, N. F. 1985 Paleoethnobotanical evidence for deforestation in ancient Iran: A case study of urban Malyan. Journal of Ethnobiology 5: 1-21.
- Miller, N. F., & Smart, T. L. 1984. Intentional burning of dung as fuel: a mechanism for the incorporation of charred seeds into the archaeological record. Journal of Ethnobiology 4 15–28.
