= Kathryn Gleason =

Landscape architecture scholar

Kathryn Gleason is Professor of Landscape Architecture at Cornell University in Ithaca, New York. Also a faculty member of the Cornell Institute for Archaeology and Material Studies, her work focuses on the archaeology of landscape architecture, especially the design and interpretation of ancient Roman and Mediterranean gardens and landscapes. Her pioneering field research on archaeological methods for detecting landscape design has been conducted across the Mediterranean and the Middle East, most recently in Italy, Israel, Jordan, and India. She is the editor of A Cultural History of Gardens in Antiquity.

== Education ==
Gleason received her BS in Landscape Architecture from Cornell University in 1979. She went on to graduate with a Masters of Landscape Architecture with Distinction from Harvard University in 1981. She received her Doctor of Philosophy in Archaeology from the University of Oxford in 1991.

== Career ==
Gleason has been a professor in the Department of Landscape Architecture at Cornell University since 1996. She previously spent 7 years at the University of Pennsylvania.

== Archaeological excavations ==
Gleason has worked on many prominent archaeological sites, including most recently the Promontory Palace Excavations at Caesara Maritima, Israel; The Horti Stabiani Garden Project in Stabiae, Italy; The Petra Pool and Garden Project in Petra, Jordan; The Mehrenghar Trust Garden Studies at Nagaur Fort in Rajasthan, India; and the Excavations at the Villa Santa Maria, Lago di Nemi, Italy.

== Awards ==
- Senior Fellow in Landscape Studies, Dumbarton Oaks, Washington D.C.
- Professeur Invité. French National Centre for Scientific Research, École Normale Superieure Paris, 2014.
- Council of Fellows. American Society of Landscape Architects, 2011.
- ASLA Award of Honor in Research. American Society of Landscape Architects, 2010
