= Maria Hopf =

Archaeobotanist

- Born: September 13, 1913
- Died: August 24, 2008 (aged 94)
- Occupation: archaeobotanist

Maria Hopf (13 September 1913 – 24 August 2008) was a pioneering archaeobotanist, based at the RGZM, Mainz.

== Career ==
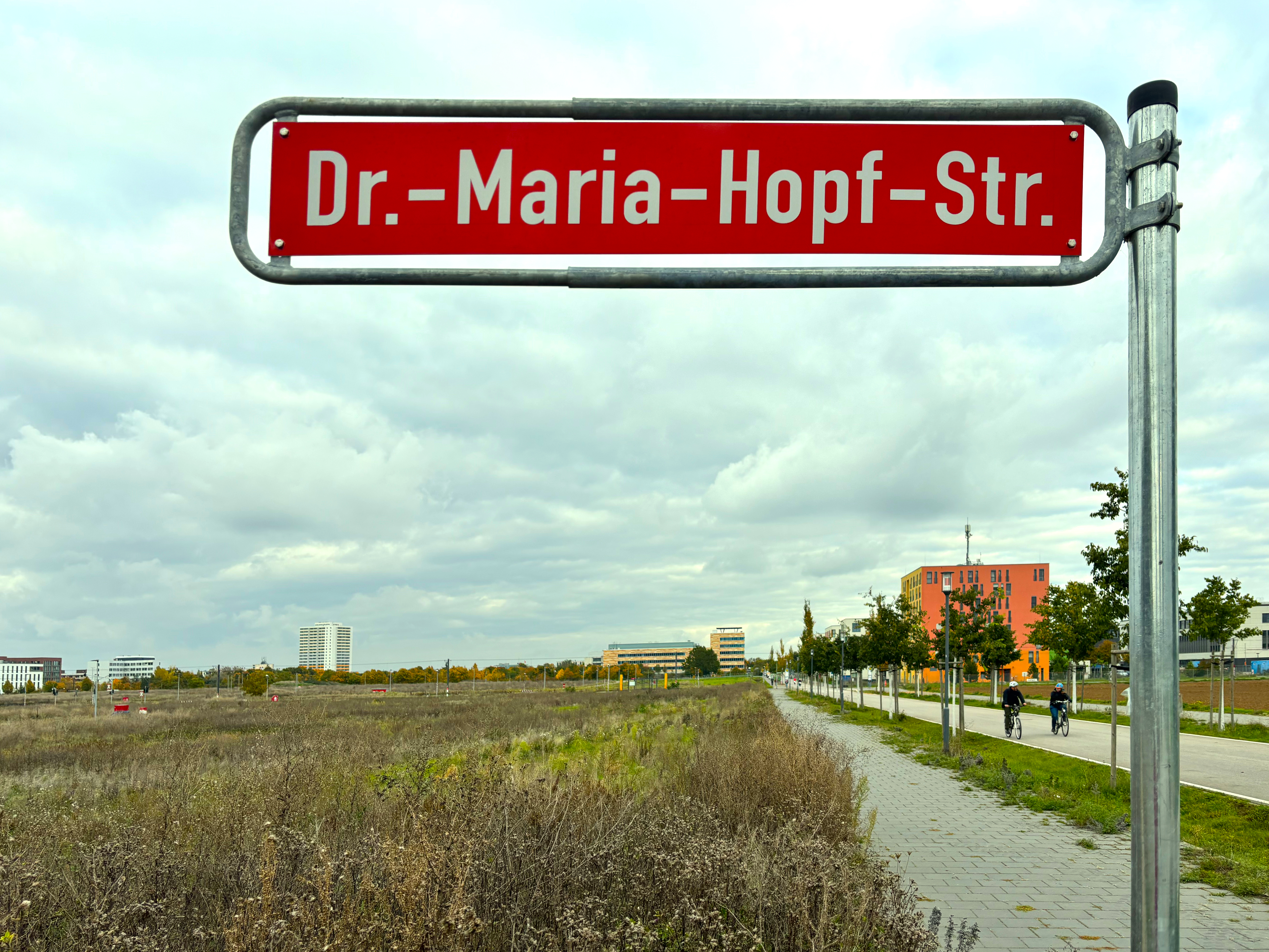
Maria Hopf Street in Mainz, Life Science Campus.

Hopf studied botany from 1941 to 1944, receiving her doctorate in 1947 on the subject of soil microbes. She then worked in phytopathology and plant physiology. From 1952 to 1956 she studied glume wheat grain and glume anatomy at the Max Planck institute for Zuchtungsforschung in Berli-Dahlem. Hopf was introduced to the study of the history of cultivated plants by Elisabeth Schiemann. She then moved to the Romisch Germanisches Zentral Museum in Main, working first as a scientific assistant, before being appointed as the head of the newly founded division of archaeobotany in 1961. The archaeobotanist Gordon Hillman studied archaeobotany for a year in Mainz with Hopf. In 1968 Hopf was one of the founders of the IWGP along with Maria Follieri, and Jane Renfrew. During her career, Hopf received scholarships to study at the Israel Museum and the Hebrew University in Jerusalem. Hopf retired in 1979. A Festschrift for Maria Hopf was published in 1979, edited by Körber-Grohne.

Hopf's work spanned the regions of Europe and Asia, and all time periods, with a particular focus on Germany, Spain and the Balkans. She published over 100 works, with a key work being the co-authored volume Domestication of Plants in the Old World, first published in 1988.

Hopf studied plant remains from Kathleen Kenyon's excavations in Jericho. In Iberia, Hopf studied plant remains from Neolithic sites in the Pais Valenciano and Andalucia.

== Selected publications ==
- Hopf, M. (1991). South and southwest Europe. In W. van zeist (Ed.), Progress in Old World Palaeoethnobotany (pp. 241–250). Balkema: Rotterdam.
- Hopf, M. (1983). Jericho plant remains. In K. Kenyon & T. Holland (Eds.), Excavations at Jericho (pp. 576–621). London: British School of Archaeology in Jerusalem.
- Rowlett, R. M., Hopf, M. (1982). Differential grain use on the Titelberg, Luxembourg. J Ethnobiol, 2(1), 79–88.
- Hopf M (1974) Pflanzenreste aus Siedlungen der Vinča-Kultur in Jugoslawien. Jahrbuch Des Römisch-Germanischen Zentralmuseums Mainz 21:1–11
- Hopf M (1961) Untersuchungsbericht über Kornfunde aus Vršnik. J Natl Mus Štip 2:41–50
- Hopf, M. (1957). Botanik und Vorgeschichte. Jahrbuch des Römisch-Germanischen Zentralmuseums Mainz, 4. http://doi.org/https://doi.org/10.11588/jrgzm.1957.0.32823
- Hopf, M. (1955). Formveränderungen von Getreidekörnern beim Verkohlen. Berichte der Deutschen Bontanischen Gesellschaft, 68, 191–3.
