= Kačina Castle =

Empire castle in the Czech Republic

Coordinates: 49°59′N 15°21′E

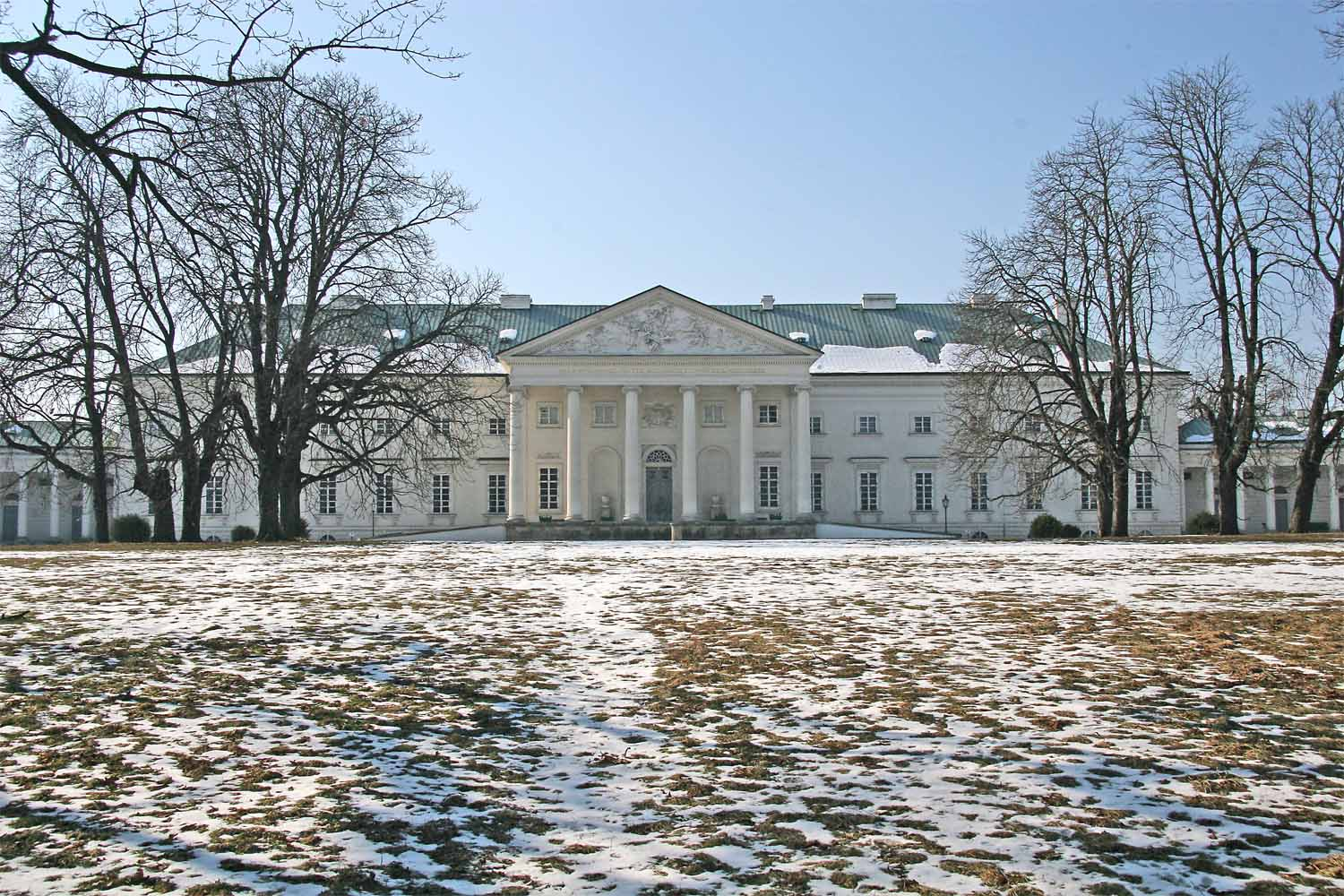
Front view

Kačina Castle (Czech: zámek Kačina) is an Empire castle in Svatý Mikuláš in the Central Bohemian Region of the Czech Republic. In 1945, it was designated a national property. It is protected as a national cultural monument.

== History ==
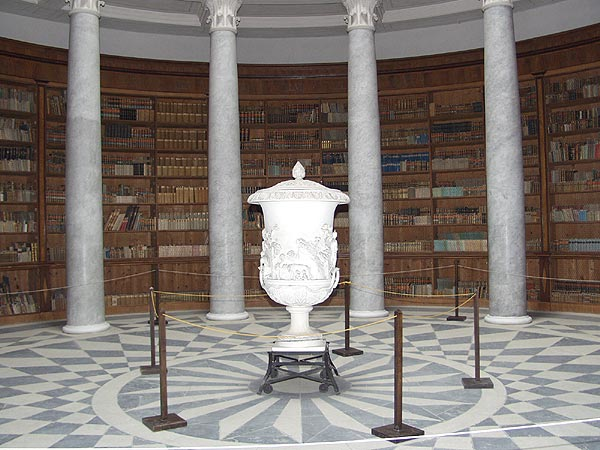
The library with more than 40,000 books

Kačina was built from 1806 to 1824 in place of the defunct medieval village of Kačín as a prestige mansion of the supreme burgrave of the Kingdom of Bohemia and president of the governorate, Jan Rudolf Chotek (1748–1824). The architectural scheme was drawn up by Saxon royal architect Christian Franz Schuricht (1753–1832) from Dresden. In the last few years of construction, Johann Philipp Jöndl (1782–1870) also controlled the construction. He also eminently influenced the final appearance of the castle.

Functionally, the castle is divided into three parts. The main (central) building with exquisite halls was the residence of the family, with two-quarter circle adjacent lower wings with pillared colonnades where the guest rooms were situated. To those wings were connected other pavilions. On the right one is situated the mansion's chapel and theatre, which were finished in the first half of the 19th century. On the left one, there is an extensive library dating from the 16th to 19th century.

The castle is surrounded by a vast park that was founded already in 1789, according to the plan of famous Viennese botanist Nikolaus Joseph von Jacquin (1727–1817). It was completed thirteen years earlier than the castle itself.
