= Jane Renfrew =

British archaeologist and paleoethnobotanist

Lady Renfrew of Kaimsthorn FSA FSA Scot
- Born: Jane Margaret Ewbank
- Occupation: Archaeologist
- Spouse: Colin Renfrew, Baron Renfrew of Kaimsthorn

Academic background
- Education: Murray Edwards College, Cambridge

Academic work
- Discipline: Archaeology
- Sub-discipline: Paleoethnobotany; History of food and wine
- Institutions: Lucy Cavendish College, Cambridge; McDonald Institute for Archaeological Research
- Notable works: Palaeoethnobotany: The Prehistoric Food Plants of the Near East and Europe

Jane Renfrew, Lady Renfrew of Kaimsthorn FSA FSA Scot is a British archaeologist and paleoethnobotanist noted for her studies on the use of plants in prehistory, the origin and development of agriculture, food and wine in antiquity, and the origin of the vine and wine in the Mediterranean.

== Biography ==
Since a young age she has shown an interest in the past, having participated in her first archaeological excavation when she was just 12 years old.

As an undergraduate at New Hall, Cambridge, she published her first book entitled "Antiquary on Horseback" (1963), with her maiden name. The volume resulted from transcribing and editing manuscripts left by Thomas Machell, rector of Kirkby Thore, Cumbria. During this period she also gained an interest in botany, and consequently paleoethnobotany. At Cambridge she met Colin Renfrew, with whom she married and had 3 children.

She took part in excavations in Greece (Nea Nikomedeia, Saliagos and Sitagroi) and the Balkans and during this time collected seeds both at excavations and museums in the region, samples which would be the basis for her doctoral thesis at Cambridge.

Between 1967–1972, she was a lecturer in the Department of Ancient History, at the University of Sheffield and later was a Visiting Lecturer at the Department of Archaeology of the University of Southampton.

In 1981, she returned to Cambridge, where she was a Fellow and Director of Studies of Archaeology Lucy Cavendish College, Cambridge and the Master's wife at Jesus College (1986-1997). At Lucy Cavendish College she has also held the positions of Vice-President, Secretary to the Governing Body, Tutor, College Lecturer, Fellow Librarian, Secretary to the Trustees and as Garden Steward. As Garden steward she was responsible for creating in 1987 the "Anglo-Saxon Herb Garden" (a collection of plants used before 1066), which is open to the general public.

In 2012 she donated a large part of her private library to Archaeological Unit and Botanical Gardens Library of the University of Trás-os-Montes and Alto Douro. In acknowledgement of her donation, her work in the field of archaeology and paleoethnobotany, as well as her role in the boards of Kew Gardens and Cambridge Botanical Garden the prehistoric garden (called "Ages of Man" / Idades do Homem) was created at the University's Botanical Gardens in her honour, which she inaugurated in 2013.

Presently she is a Senior Fellow of the McDonald Institute for Archaeological Research and Emeritus Fellow of Lucy Cavendish College, Cambridge.

== Positions ==
- Emeritus Fellow and previously Director of Studies of Archaeology and De Brye College Lecturer in Archaeology of Lucy Cavendish College, University of Cambridge (since 1984–)
- Senior Fellow at the McDonald Institute for Archaeological Research (Senior Fellow since ...)
- President of the International Workgroup for Paleoethnobotany (1983-1986)
- Vice-president of The Prehistoric Society (1986–1989)
- Trustee of the Royal Botanic Gardens, Kew (1991–1997)
- Trustee of the Stanley Smith Horticultural Trust (1993–present)
- Syndic of the Cambridge University Botanic Garden (since 1999)
- Lecturer, Department of Ancient History, University of Sheffield (1967–1972)
- Visiting Lecturer, Department of Archaeology, University of Southampton (1978–1981)
- Master's wife, Jesus College, Cambridge (1986–1997)
- Member, Cambridgeshire Police Authority (1989–1999)
- Governor, King's Ely (1989–1998)
- Governor, British School in Colombo, Sri Lanka (1996–2001)
- Chairman of the Southacre, Latham and Chaucer Road Residents' Association (SOLACHRA) (1999–2002)
- Member of the Jury, British Archaeology Awards (since 1990)

== Awards and accolades ==
The Stanley Smith Horticultural Trust funded the creation of a wildlife pond at Lucy Cavendish in recognition of her contribution to the Lucy Cavendish College, its gardens and the University of Cambridge.

The University of Trás-os-Montes and Alto Douro (UTAD) gave her a Medal of Honour in recognition for the donation of her personal library (with books in archaeology, prehistory, history, botany, biology and related sciences) to the Archaeological Unit, Department of Geology and the Botanical Gardens of UTAD.

== Publications ==
- Renfrew, Jane, 1973, Paleoethnobotany, the prehistoric food plants of the Near East and Europe, Methuen, London / Columbia University Press, New York.
- Renfrew, Jane, 1985a, Food and Cooking in Prehistoric Britain. English Heritage.
- Renfrew, Jane, 1985b, Food and Cooking in Roman Britain. English Heritage.
- Renfrew, Jane, 1991, New light on early farming: recent developments in paleoethnobotany. Edinburgh University Press.
- Renfrew, Jane; Renfrew, Magnus and Rose, John K., 1996,. Rus in Urbe: Chaucer Road and Latham Road: the History of Two Rural Roads in Cambridge. SOLACHRA.
- Renfrew, Jane, 2005, Prehistoric Cookery: Recipes and History. English Heritage.
- Renfrew, Jane, 2006, Food and feasting in antiquity. Antiquity, 80(310):1000–1003.
