= Neolithic Revolution =

Transition in human history from hunter-gatherer to settled peoples

Map of West Asia showing the main archaeological sites of the Pre-Pottery Neolithic period, c. 7500 BCE, in the "Fertile Crescent". Black squares indicate pre-agricultural sites.

The Neolithic Revolution, also known as the First Agricultural Revolution, was the wide-scale transition of many human cultures during the Neolithic period in Afro-Eurasia from a lifestyle of hunting and gathering to one of agriculture and settlement, making an increasingly large population possible. These settled communities permitted humans to observe and experiment with plants, learning how they grew and developed. This new knowledge led to the domestication of plants into crops.

Archaeological data indicate that the domestication of various types of plants and animals happened in separate locations worldwide, starting in the geological epoch of the Holocene 11,700 years ago, after the end of the last Ice Age. It was humankind's first historically verifiable transition to agriculture. The Neolithic Revolution greatly narrowed the diversity of foods available, resulting in a decrease in the quality of human nutrition compared with that obtained previously from hunting and foraging. Recent archaeological excavations at sites like Oued Beht further demonstrate how early Neolithic communities rapidly adopted localized crop cultivation and animal husbandry to establish complex defensive and settlement structures. However, because food production became more efficient, it released humans to invest their efforts in other activities and was thus "ultimately necessary to the rise of modern civilization by creating the foundation for the later process of industrialization and sustained economic growth".

The Neolithic Revolution involved much more than the adoption of a limited set of food-producing techniques. During the next millennia, it transformed the small and mobile groups of hunter-gatherers that had hitherto dominated human prehistory into sedentary (non-nomadic) societies based in built-up villages and towns. These societies radically modified their natural environment by means of specialized food-crop cultivation, with activities such as irrigation and deforestation which allowed the production of surplus food. Other developments that are found very widely during this era are the domestication of animals, pottery, polished stone tools, and rectangular houses. In many regions, the adoption of agriculture by prehistoric societies caused episodes of rapid population growth, a phenomenon known as the Neolithic demographic transition.

These developments, sometimes called the Neolithic package, provided the basis for centralized administrations and political structures, hierarchical ideologies, depersonalized systems of knowledge (e.g. writing), densely populated settlements, specialization and division of labour, more trade, the development of non-portable art and architecture, and greater property ownership. The earliest known civilization developed in Sumer in southern Mesopotamia (c. 6,500 BP); its emergence also heralded the beginning of the Bronze Age.

The relationship of the aforementioned Neolithic characteristics to the onset of agriculture, their sequence of emergence, and their empirical relation to each other at various Neolithic sites remains the subject of academic debate. It is usually understood to vary from place to place, rather than being the outcome of universal laws of social evolution.

== Background ==
Prehistoric hunter-gatherers had different subsistence requirements and lifestyles from agriculturalists. Hunter-gatherers were often highly mobile and migratory, living in temporary shelters and in small tribal groups, and having limited contact with outsiders. Their diet was well-balanced though heavily dependent on what the environment could provide each season. In contrast, because the surplus and plannable supply of food provided by agriculture made it possible to support larger population groups, agriculturalists lived in more permanent dwellings in more densely populated settlements than what could be supported by a hunter-gatherer lifestyle. The agricultural communities' seasonal need to plan and coordinate resource and manpower encouraged division of labour, which gradually led to specialization of labourers and complex societies. The subsequent development of trading networks to exchange surplus commodities and services brought agriculturalists into contact with outside groups, which promoted cultural exchanges that led to the rise of civilizations and technological evolutions.

However, higher population and food abundance did not necessarily correlate with improved health. Reliance on a very limited variety of staple crops can adversely affect health even while making it possible to feed more people. As an example from the Americas, maize is deficient in certain essential amino acids (lysine and tryptophan) and is a poor source of iron. The phytic acid it contains may inhibit nutrient absorption. Other factors that likely affected the health of early agriculturalists and their domesticated livestock would have been increased numbers of parasites and disease-bearing pests associated with human waste and contaminated food and water supplies. Fertilizers and irrigation may have increased crop yields but also would have promoted proliferation of insects and bacteria in the local environment while grain storage attracted additional insects and rodents.

== Agricultural transition ==
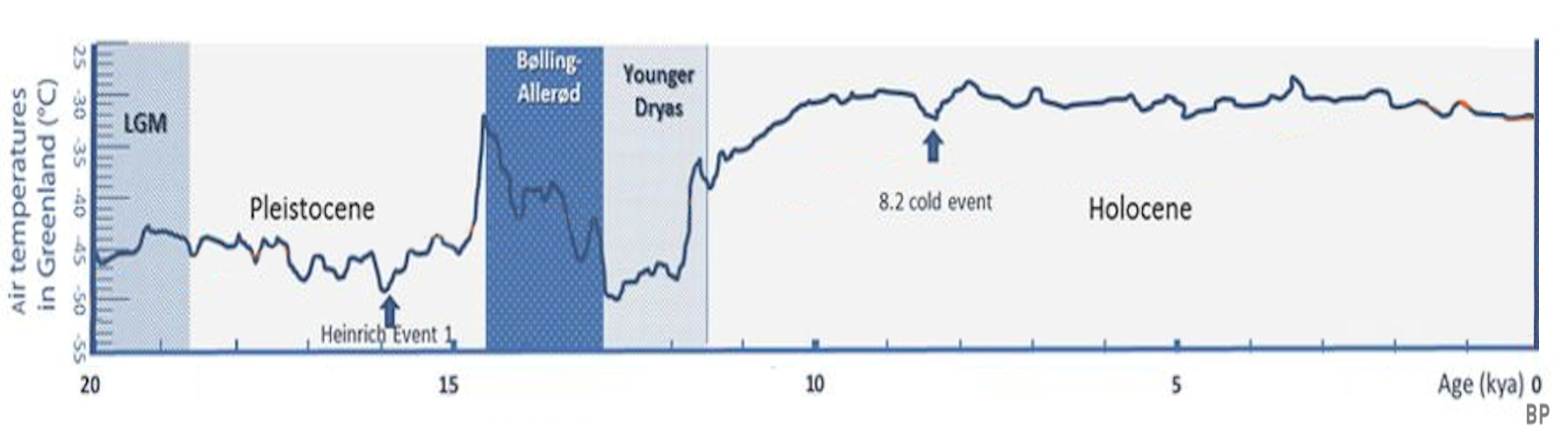
Evolution of temperatures in the Post-Glacial period after the Last Glacial Maximum (LGM) according to Greenland ice cores. The birth of agriculture corresponds to the period of quickly rising temperature at the end of the cold spell of the Younger Dryas and the beginning of the long and warm period of the Holocene.

Map of the world showing approximate centres of origin of agriculture and its spread in prehistory: the Fertile Crescent (11,000 BP), the Yangtze and Yellow River basins (9,000 BP) and the Papua New Guinea Highlands (9,000–6,000 BP), Central Mexico (5,000–4,000 BP), Northern South America (5,000–4,000 BP), sub-Saharan Africa (5,000–4,000 BP, exact location unknown), eastern North America (4,000–3,000 BP).

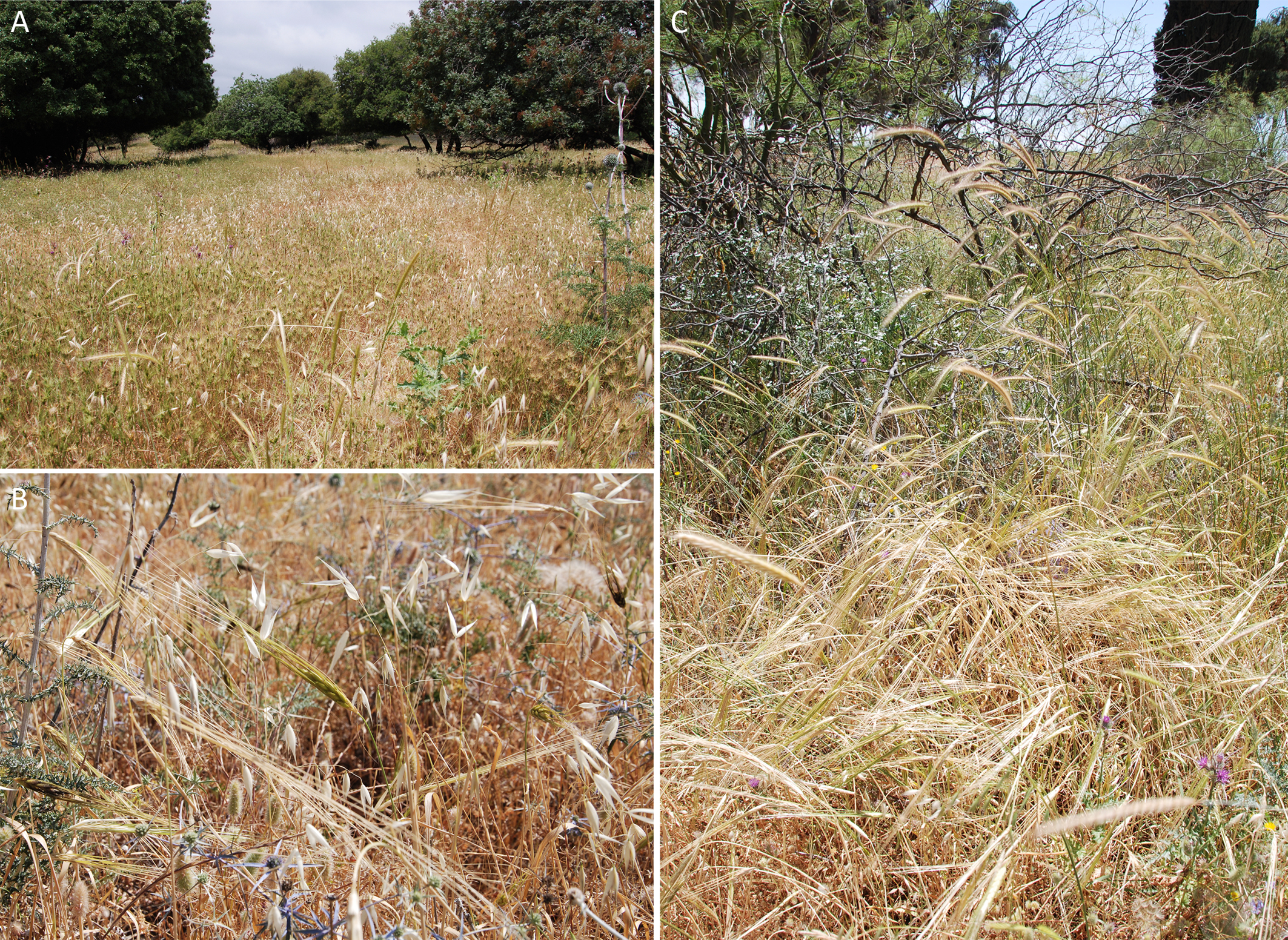
Associations of wild cereals and other wild grasses in Israel.

The term 'neolithic revolution' was invented by V. Gordon Childe in his book Man Makes Himself (1936). Childe introduced it as the first in a series of agricultural revolutions in Middle Eastern history, calling it a "revolution" to denote its significance, the degree of change to communities adopting and refining agricultural practices.

The beginning of this process in different regions has been dated from 10,000 to 8,000 BCE in the Fertile Crescent, and perhaps 8000 BCE in the Kuk Early Agricultural Site of Papua New Guinea in Melanesia. Everywhere, this transition is associated with a change from a largely nomadic hunter-gatherer way of life to a more settled, agrarian one, with the domestication of various plant and animal species – depending on the species locally available, and influenced by local culture. Archaeological research in 2003 suggests that in some regions, such as the Southeast Asian peninsula, the transition from hunter-gatherer to agriculturalist was not linear, but region-specific.

== Domestication ==
=== Crops ===
Once agriculture started gaining momentum, around 9000 BP, human activity resulted in the selective breeding of cereal grasses (beginning with emmer, einkorn and barley), and not simply of those that favoured greater caloric returns through larger seeds. Plants with traits such as small seeds or bitter taste were seen as undesirable. Plants that rapidly shed their seeds on maturity tended not to be gathered at harvest, therefore not stored and not seeded the following season; successive years of harvesting spontaneously selected for strains that retained their edible seeds longer.

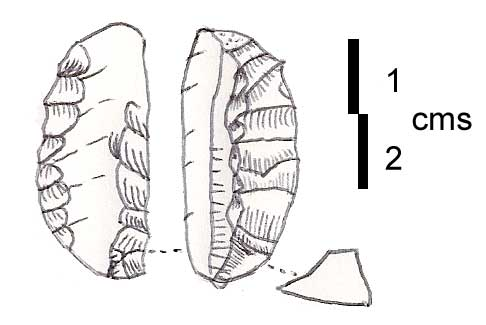
An "Orange slice" sickle blade element with inverse, discontinuous retouch on each side, not denticulated. Found in large quantities at Qaraoun II and often with Heavy Neolithic tools in the flint workshops of the Beqaa Valley in Lebanon. Suggested by James Mellaart to be older than the Pottery Neolithic of Byblos (around 8,400 cal. BP).

Daniel Zohary identified several plant species as "pioneer crops" or Neolithic founder crops. He highlighted the importance of wheat, barley and rye, and suggested that domestication of flax, peas, chickpeas, bitter vetch and lentils came a little later. Based on analysis of the genes of domesticated plants, he preferred theories of a single, or at most a very small number of domestication events for each taxon that spread in an arc from the Levantine corridor around the Fertile Crescent and later into Europe. Gordon Hillman and Stuart Davies carried out experiments with varieties of wild wheat to show that the process of domestication would have occurred over a relatively short period of between 20 and 200 years.

Some of the pioneering attempts failed at first and crops were abandoned, sometimes to be taken up again and successfully domesticated thousands of years later: rye, tried and abandoned in Neolithic Anatolia, made its way to Europe as weed seeds and was successfully domesticated in Europe, thousands of years after the earliest agriculture. Wild lentils presented a different problem: most of the wild seeds do not germinate in the first year; the first evidence of lentil domestication, breaking dormancy in their first year, appears in the early Neolithic at Jerf el Ahmar (in modern Syria), and lentils quickly spread south to the Netiv HaGdud site in the Jordan Valley. The process of domestication allowed the founder crops to adapt and eventually become larger, more easily harvested, more dependable in storage and more useful to the human population.

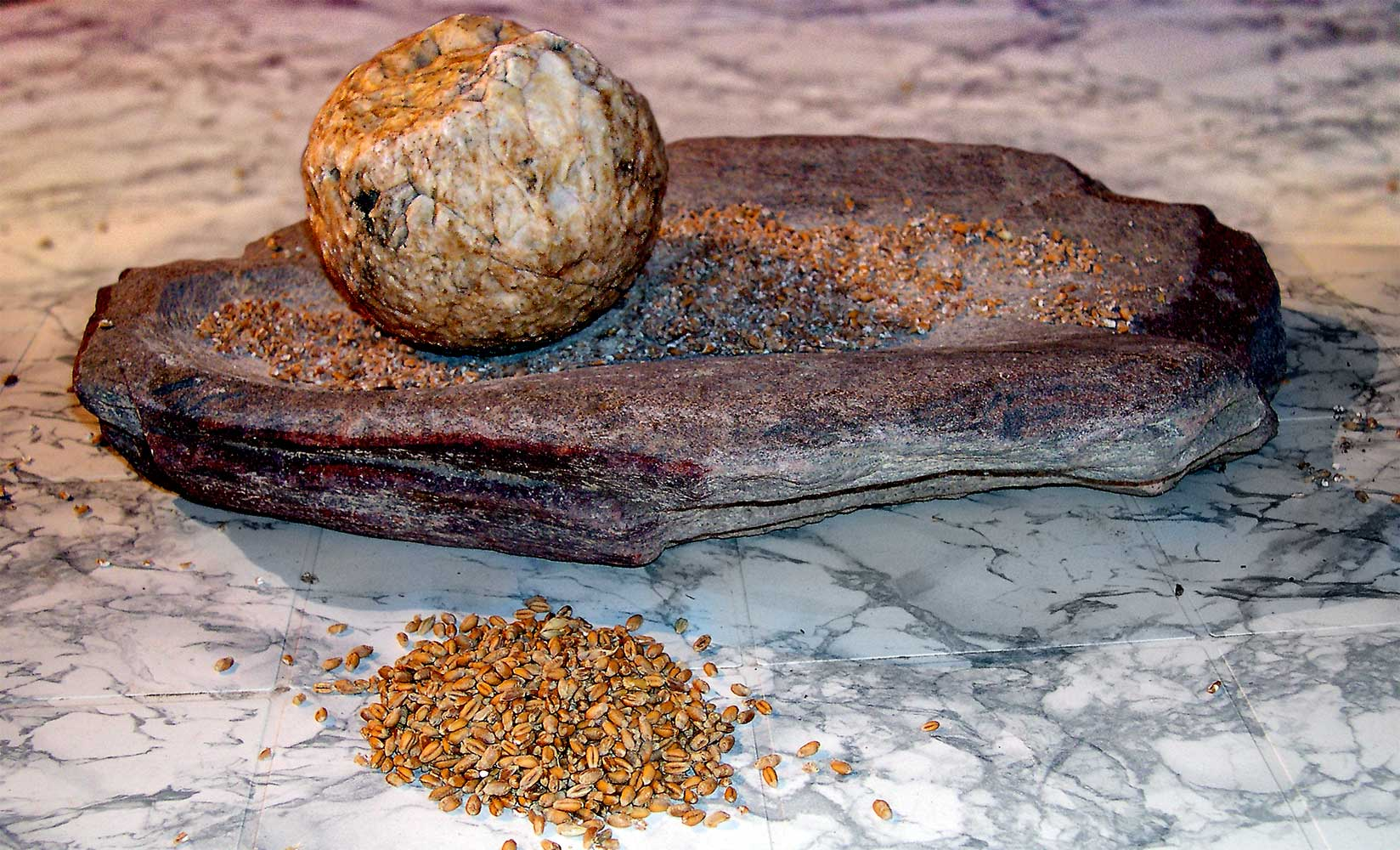
Neolithic grindstone or quern for processing grain

Selectively propagated figs, wild barley and wild oats were cultivated at the early Neolithic site of Gilgal I, where in 2006 archaeologists found caches of seeds of each in quantities too large to be accounted for even by intensive gathering, at strata datable to c. 11,000 years ago. Some of the plants tried and then abandoned during the Neolithic period in the Ancient Near East, at sites like Gilgal, were later successfully domesticated in other parts of the world.

Once early farmers perfected their agricultural techniques like irrigation (traced as far back as the 6th millennium BCE in Khuzestan), their crops yielded surpluses that needed storage. Most hunter-gatherers could not easily store food for long due to their migratory lifestyle, whereas those with a sedentary dwelling could store their surplus grain. Eventually granaries were developed that allowed villages to store their seeds longer. So with more food, the population expanded and communities developed specialized workers and more advanced tools.

The process was not as linear as was once thought, but a more complicated effort, which was undertaken by different human populations in different regions in many different ways.

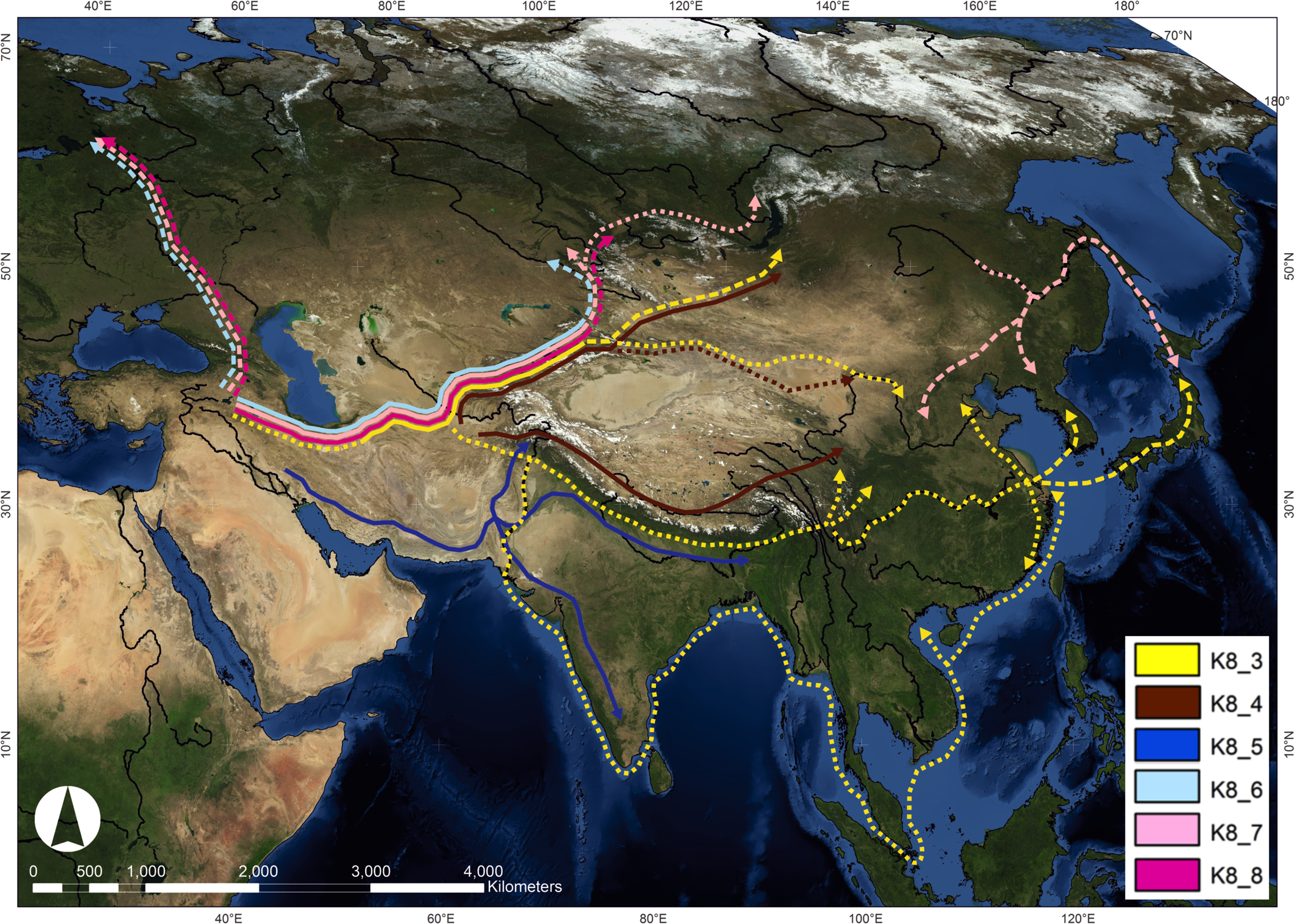
Genetic analysis on the spread of barley from 9,000 to 2,000 BP

One of the world's most important crops, barley, was domesticated in the Near East around 11,000 years ago (c. 9,000 BCE). Barley is a highly resilient crop, able to grow in varied and marginal environments, such as in regions of high altitude and latitude. Archaeobotanical evidence shows that barley had spread throughout Eurasia by 2,000 BCE. To further elucidate the routes by which barley cultivation was spread through Eurasia, genetic analysis was used to determine genetic diversity and population structure in extant barley taxa. Genetic analysis shows that cultivated barley spread through Eurasia via several different routes, which were most likely separated in both time and space.

=== Livestock ===
When hunter-gathering began to be replaced by sedentary food production it became more efficient to keep animals close at hand. Therefore, it became necessary to bring animals permanently to their settlements, although in many cases there was a distinction between relatively sedentary farmers and nomadic herders. The animals' size, temperament, diet, mating patterns, and life span were factors in the desire and success in domesticating animals. Animals that provided milk, such as cows and goats, offered a source of protein that was renewable and therefore quite valuable. The animal's ability as a worker (for example ploughing or towing), as well as a food source, also had to be taken into account. Besides being a direct source of food, certain animals could provide leather, wool, hides, and fertilizer. Some of the earliest domesticated animals included dogs (East Asia, about 15,000 years ago), sheep, goats, cows, and pigs.

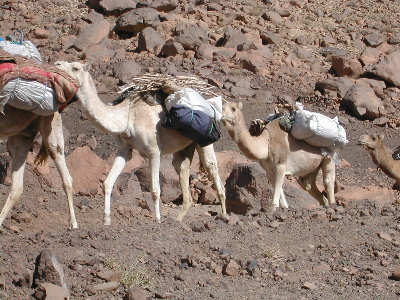
Dromedary caravan in Algeria

West Asia was the source for many animals that could be domesticated, such as sheep, goats and pigs. This area was also the first region to domesticate the dromedary. Henri Fleisch discovered and termed the Shepherd Neolithic flint industry from the Bekaa Valley in Lebanon and suggested that it could have been used by the earliest nomadic shepherds. He dated this industry to the Epipaleolithic or Pre-Pottery Neolithic as it is evidently not Paleolithic, Mesolithic or even Pottery Neolithic.

The presence of these animals gave the region a large advantage in cultural and economic development. As the climate in the Middle East changed and became drier, many of the farmers were forced to leave, taking their domesticated animals with them. It was this massive emigration from the Middle East that later helped distribute these animals to the rest of Afroeurasia. This emigration was mainly on an east–west axis of similar climates, as crops usually have a narrow optimal climatic range outside of which they cannot grow for reasons of light or rain changes. For instance, wheat does not normally grow in tropical climates, just like tropical crops such as bananas do not grow in colder climates. Some authors, like Jared Diamond, have postulated that this east–west axis is the main reason why plant and animal domestication spread so quickly from the Fertile Crescent to the rest of Eurasia and North Africa, while it did not reach through the north–south axis of Africa to reach the Mediterranean climates of South Africa, where temperate crops were successfully imported by ships in the last 500 years. Similarly, the African Zebu of central Africa and the domesticated bovines of the fertile-crescent — separated by the dry sahara desert — were not introduced into each other's region.

== Centers of agricultural origin ==
=== West Asia ===
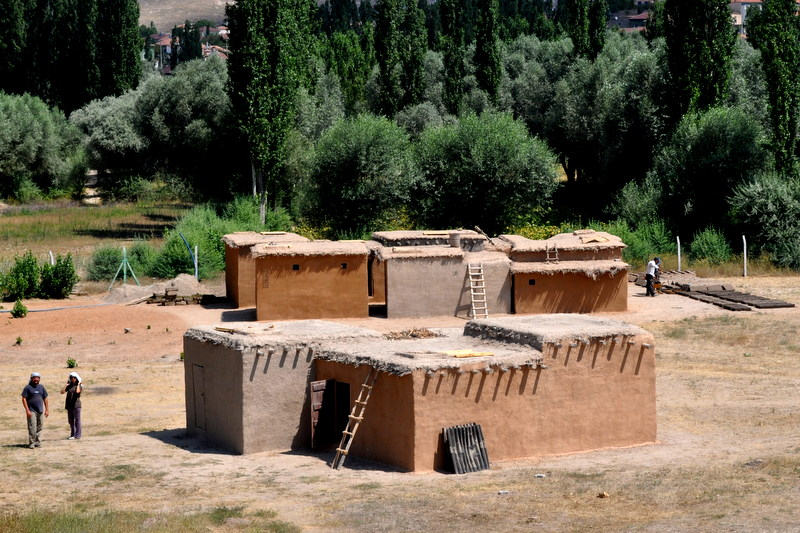
The Neolithic is characterized by fixed human settlements and the invention of agriculture from c. 10,000 BP. Reconstitution of Pre-Pottery Neolithic B housing in Aşıklı Höyük, modern Turkey.

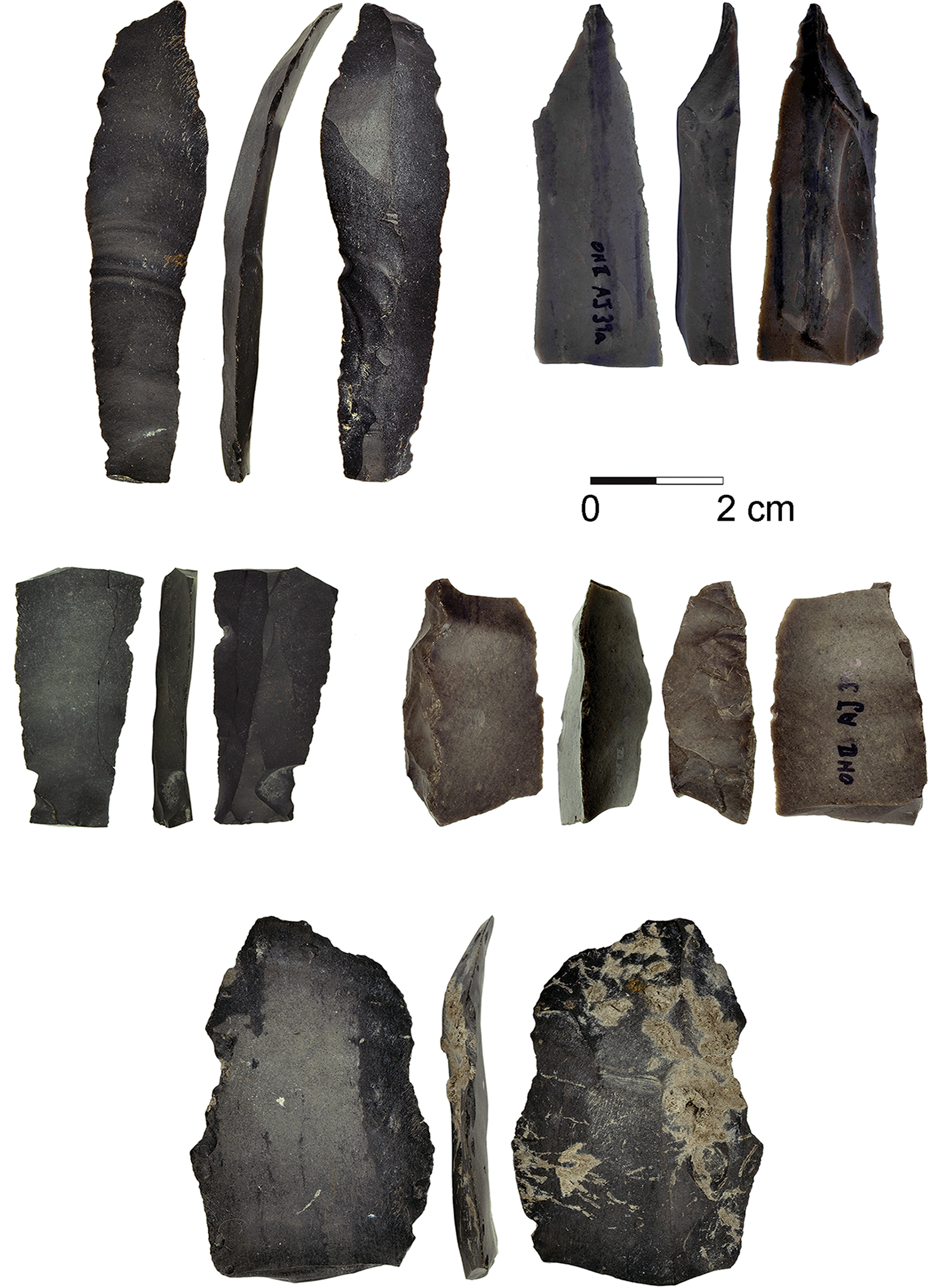
Composite sickles for cereal harvesting at 23,000-Years-Old

Use-wear analysis of five glossed flint blades found at Ohalo II, a 23,000-years-old fisher-hunter-gatherers' camp on the shore of the Sea of Galilee, Northern Israel, provides the earliest evidence for the use of composite cereal harvesting tools. The Ohalo site is at the junction of the Upper Paleolithic and the Early Epipaleolithic, and has been attributed to both periods.

The wear traces indicate that tools were used for harvesting near-ripe semi-green wild cereals, shortly before grains are ripe and disperse naturally. The studied tools were not used intensively, and they reflect two harvesting modes: flint knives held by hand and inserts hafted in a handle. The finds shed new light on cereal harvesting techniques some 8,000 years before the Natufian and 12,000 years before the establishment of sedentary farming communities in the Near East. Furthermore, the new finds accord well with evidence for the earliest ever cereal cultivation at the site and the use of stone-made grinding implements.

Agriculture appeared first in West Asia about 10,000–9,000 years ago. The region was the centre of domestication for three cereals (einkorn wheat, emmer wheat and barley), four legumes (lentil, pea, bitter vetch and chickpea), and flax. Domestication was a slow process that unfolded across multiple regions, and was preceded by centuries if not millennia of pre-domestication cultivation.

Other sites in the Levantine corridor that show early evidence of agriculture include Wadi Faynan 16 and Netiv Hagdud. Jacques Cauvin noted that the settlers of Aswad did not domesticate on site, but "arrived, perhaps from the neighbouring Anti-Lebanon, already equipped with the seed for planting". In the Eastern Fertile Crescent, evidence of cultivation of wild plants has been found in Choga Gholan in Iran dated to 12,000 BP, with domesticated emmer wheat appearing in 9,800 BP, suggesting there may have been multiple regions in the Fertile Crescent where cereal domestication evolved roughly contemporaneously. The Heavy Neolithic Qaraoun culture has been identified at around fifty sites in Lebanon around the source springs of the River Jordan, but never reliably dated.

=== East Asia ===
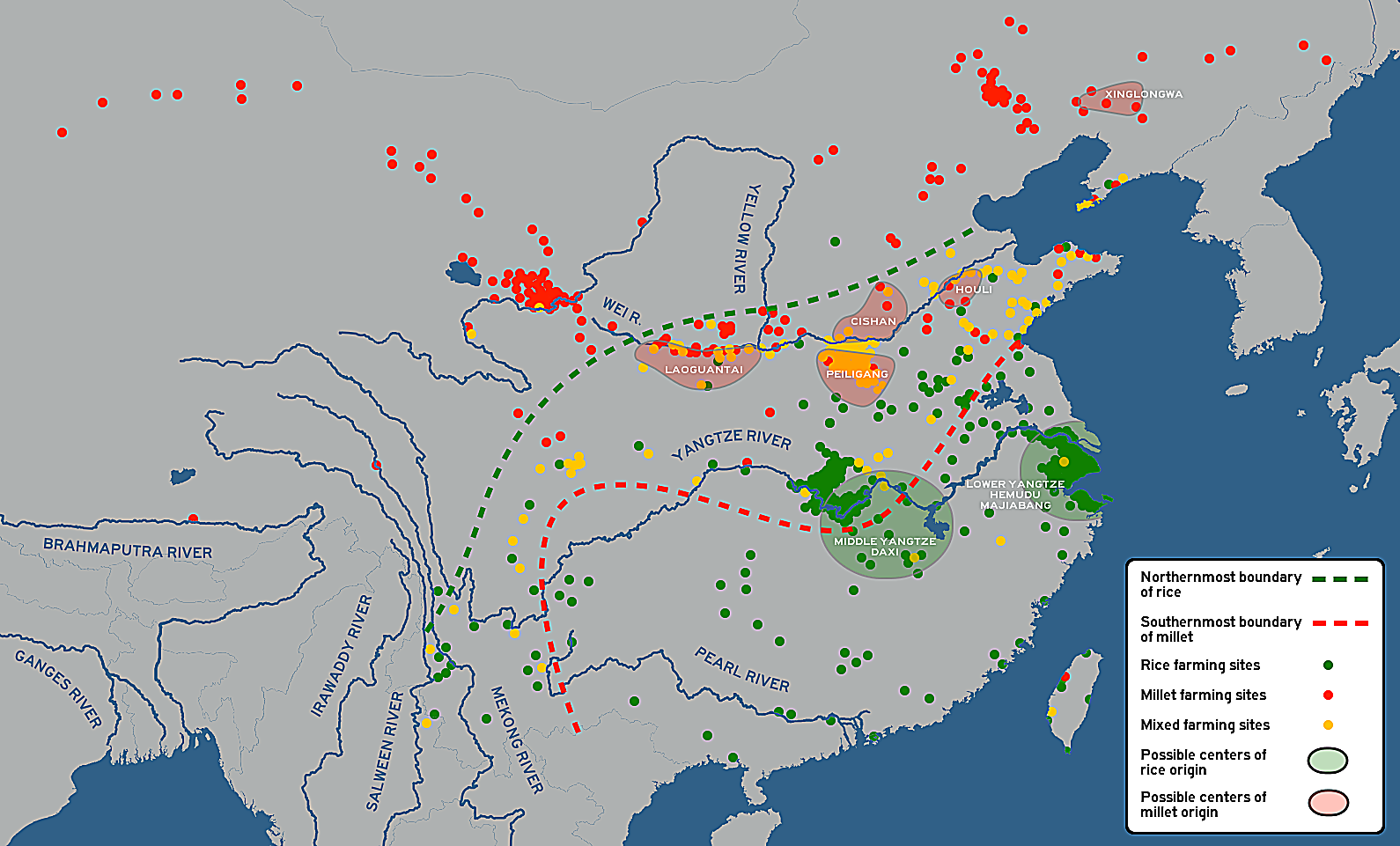
Spatial distribution of rice, millet and mixed farming sites in Neolithic China (He et al., 2017)

Agriculture in Neolithic China can be separated into two broad regions, Northern China and Southern China.

The agricultural centre in northern China is believed to be the homelands of the early Sino-Tibetan-speakers, associated with the Houli, Peiligang, Cishan, and Xinglongwa cultures, clustered around the Yellow River basin. It was the domestication centre for foxtail millet (Setaria italica) and broomcorn millet (Panicum miliaceum), with early evidence of domestication approximately 8,000 years ago, and widespread cultivation 7,500 years ago. (Soybean was also domesticated in northern China 4,500 years ago. Orange and peach also originated in China, being cultivated c. 2500 BCE.)

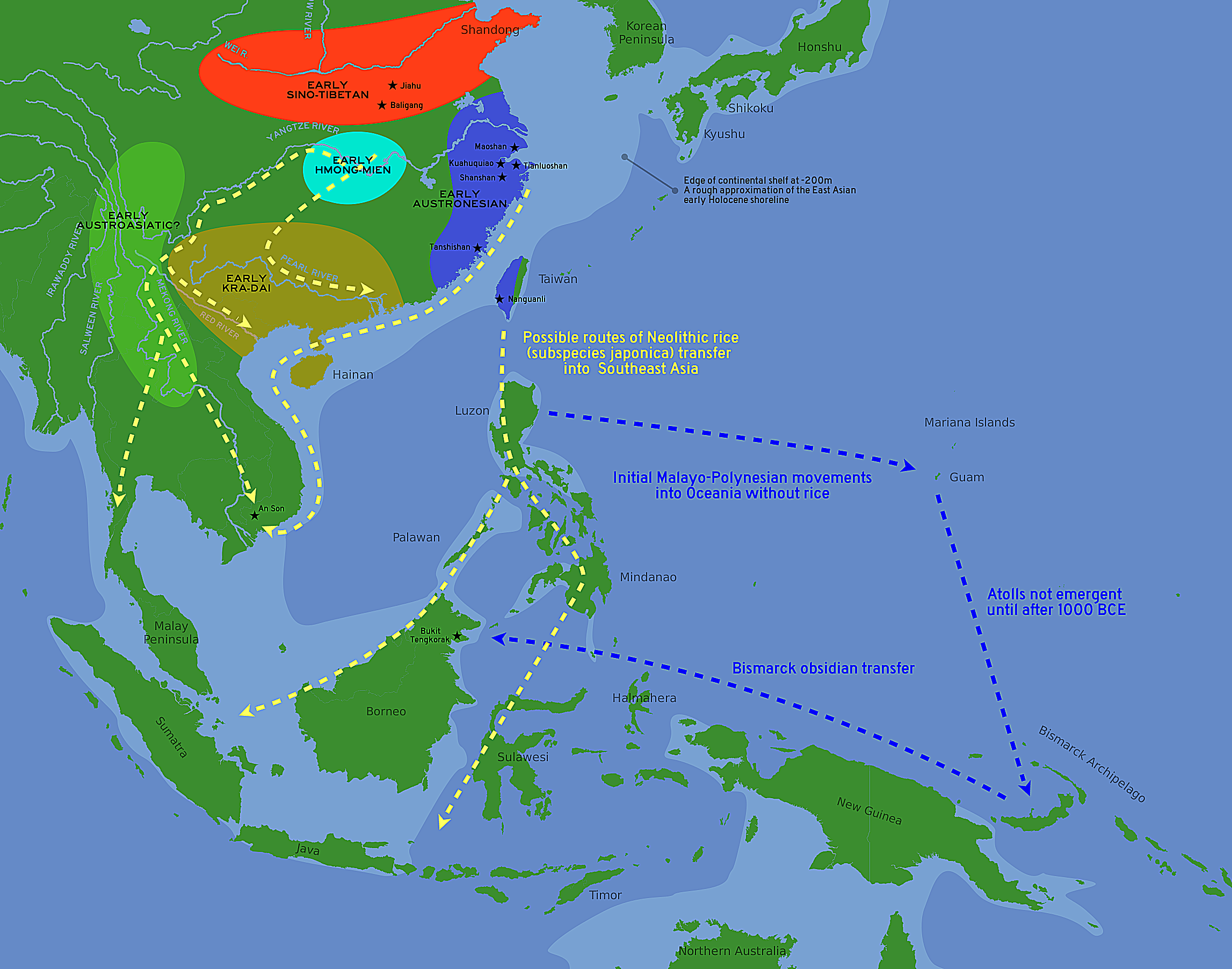
Possible language family homelands, and likely routes of early rice transfer (c. 3,500 to 500 BCE). The approximate coastlines during the early Holocene are shown in lighter blue. (Bellwood, 2011)

The agricultural centres in southern China are clustered around the Yangtze River basin. Rice was domesticated in this region, together with the development of paddy field cultivation, between 13,500 and 8,200 years ago.

There are two possible centres of domestication for rice. The first is in the lower Yangtze River, believed to be the homelands of pre-Austronesians and associated with the Kauhuqiao, Hemudu, Majiabang, and Songze cultures. It is characterized by typical pre-Austronesian features, including stilt houses, jade carving, and boat technologies. Their diet were also supplemented by acorns, water chestnuts, foxnuts, and pig domestication. The second is in the middle Yangtze River, believed to be the homelands of the early Hmong–Mien speakers and associated with the Pengtoushan and Daxi cultures. Both of these regions were heavily populated and had regular trade contacts with each other, as well as with early Austroasiatic speakers to the west, and early Kra-Dai speakers to the south, facilitating the spread of rice cultivation throughout southern China.

Chronological dispersal of Austronesian peoples across the Indo-Pacific (Bellwood in Chambers, 2008)

The millet and rice-farming cultures also first came into contact with each other at around 9,000 to 7,000 BP, resulting in a corridor between the millet and rice cultivation centres where both rice and millet were cultivated. At around 5,500 to 4,000 BP, there was increasing migration into Taiwan from the early Austronesian Dapenkeng culture, bringing rice and millet cultivation technology with them. During this period, there is evidence of large settlements and intensive rice cultivation in Taiwan and the Penghu Islands, which may have resulted in overexploitation. Bellwood (2011) proposes that this may have been the impetus of the Austronesian expansion which started with the migration of the Austronesian-speakers from Taiwan to the Philippines at around 5,000 BP.

Austronesians carried rice cultivation technology to Island Southeast Asia along with other domesticated species. The new tropical island environments also had new food plants that they exploited. They carried useful plants and animals during each colonization voyage, resulting in the rapid introduction of domesticated and semi-domesticated species throughout Oceania. They also came into contact with the early agricultural centres of Papuan-speaking populations of New Guinea as well as the Dravidian-speaking regions of South India and Sri Lanka by around 3,500 BP. They acquired further cultivated food plants like bananas and pepper from them, and in turn introduced Austronesian technologies like wetland cultivation and outrigger canoes. During the 1st millennium CE, they also colonized Madagascar and the Comoros, bringing Southeast Asian food plants, including rice, to East Africa.

=== Africa ===
Nile River Valley, Egypt

On the African continent, three areas have been identified as having independently developed agriculture: the Ethiopian highlands, the Sahel and West Africa. By contrast, agriculture in the Nile River Valley is thought to be related to migration of populations and to have developed from the original Neolithic Revolution in the Fertile Crescent. Many grinding stones are found with the early Egyptian Sebilian and Mechian cultures and evidence has been found of a Neolithic domesticated crop-based economy dating around 7,000 BP. Unlike the Middle East, this evidence appears as a "false dawn" to agriculture, as the sites were later abandoned, and permanent farming then was delayed until 6,500 BP with the Tasian culture and Badarian culture and the arrival of crops and animals from the Near East.

Bananas and plantains, which were first domesticated in Southeast Asia, most likely Papua New Guinea, were re-domesticated in Africa possibly as early as 5,000 years ago. Asian yams and taro were also cultivated in Africa.

The most famous crop domesticated in the Ethiopian highlands is coffee. In addition, khat, ensete, noog, teff and finger millet were also domesticated in the Ethiopian highlands. Crops domesticated in the Sahel region include sorghum and pearl millet. The kola nut was first domesticated in West Africa. Other crops domesticated in West Africa include African rice, yams and the oil palm.

Agriculture spread to Central and Southern Africa in the Bantu expansion during the 1st millennium BCE to 1st millennium CE.

Map of the world in 2000 BCE, just after the end of the 3rd millennium BCE, colour coded by cultural stage. simple farming societies complex farming societies (Near East, Europe, China, Andes) state societies (Fertile Crescent, Egypt, Indus, Crete, Caral/Norte Chico)

=== Americas ===
The term "Neolithic" is not customarily used in describing cultures in the Americas. However, a broad similarity exists between Eastern Hemisphere cultures of the Neolithic and cultures in the Americas. Maize (corn), beans and squash were among the earliest crops domesticated in Mesoamerica: squash as early as 6000 BCE, beans no later than 4000 BCE, and maize beginning about 7000 BCE. Potatoes and manioc were domesticated in South America. In what is now the eastern United States, Native Americans domesticated sunflower, sumpweed and goosefoot c. 2500 BCE. In the highlands of central Mexico, sedentary village life based on farming did not develop until the "formative period" in the second millennium BCE.

=== New Guinea ===
Evidence of drainage ditches at Kuk Swamp on the borders of the Western and Southern Highlands of Papua New Guinea indicates cultivation of taro and a variety of other crops, dating back to 11,000 BP. Two potentially significant economic species, taro (Colocasia esculenta) and yam (Dioscorea sp.), have been identified dating at least to 10,200 calibrated years before present (cal BP). Further evidence of bananas and sugarcane dates to 6,950 to 6,440 BCE. This was at the altitudinal limits of these crops, and it has been suggested that cultivation in more favourable ranges in the lowlands may have been even earlier. CSIRO has found evidence that taro was introduced into the Solomon Islands for human use, from 28,000 years ago, making taro the earliest cultivated crop in the world. It seems to have resulted in the spread of the Trans–New Guinea languages from New Guinea east into the Solomon Islands and west into Timor and adjacent areas of Indonesia. This seems to confirm the theories of Carl Sauer who, in "Agricultural Origins and Dispersals", suggested as early as 1952 that this region was a centre of early agriculture.

== Spread of agriculture ==
=== Europe ===
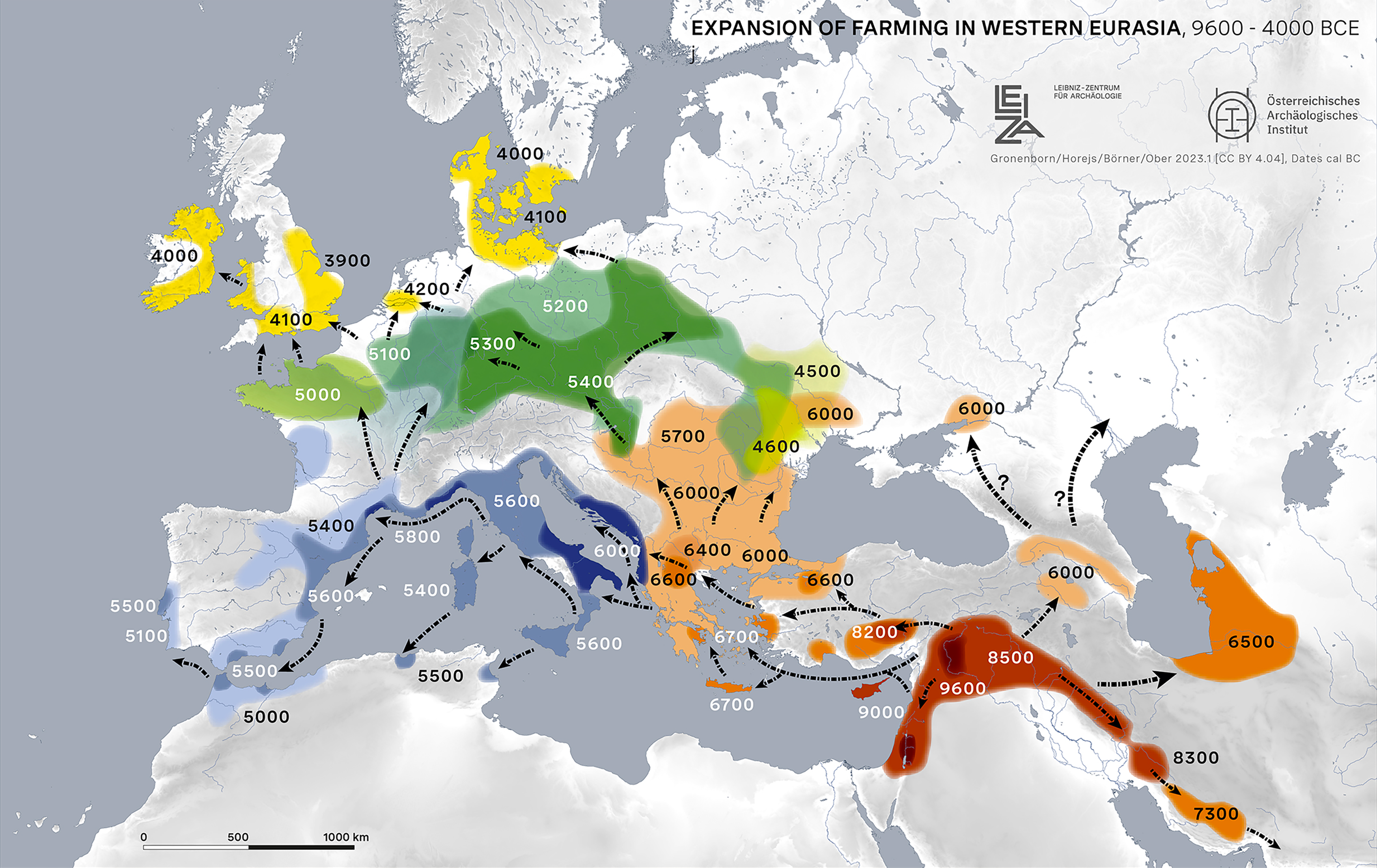
Spread of farming from Southwest Asia to Europe, between 9600 and 3800 BCE

Archaeologists trace the emergence of food-producing societies in the Levantine region of southwest Asia at the close of the last glacial period around 12,000 BCE, and developed into a number of regionally distinctive cultures by the eighth millennium BCE. Remains of food-producing societies in the Aegean have been carbon-dated to c. 6500 BCE at Knossos, Franchthi Cave, and a number of mainland sites in Thessaly. Neolithic groups appear soon afterwards in the Balkans and south-central Europe. The Neolithic cultures of southeastern Europe (the Balkans and the Aegean) show some continuity with groups in southwest Asia and Anatolia (e.g., Çatalhöyük).

Current evidence suggests that Neolithic material culture was introduced to Europe via western Anatolia. All Neolithic sites in Europe contain ceramics, and contain the plants and animals domesticated in Southwest Asia: einkorn, emmer, barley, lentils, pigs, goats, sheep, and cattle. Genetic data suggest that no independent domestication of animals took place in Neolithic Europe, and that all domesticated animals were originally domesticated in Southwest Asia. The only domesticate not from Southwest Asia was broomcorn millet, domesticated in East Asia.The earliest evidence of cheese-making dates to 5500 BCE in Kujawy, Poland.

The diffusion across Europe, from the Aegean to Britain, took about 2,500 years (8500–6000 BP). The Baltic region was penetrated a bit later, around 5500 BP, and there was also a delay in settling the Pannonian plain. In general, colonization shows a "saltatory" pattern, as the Neolithic advanced from one patch of fertile alluvial soil to another, bypassing mountainous areas. Analysis of radiocarbon dates show clearly that Mesolithic and Neolithic populations lived side by side for as much as a millennium in many parts of Europe, especially in the Iberian Peninsula and along the Atlantic coast.

==== Carbon 14 evidence ====
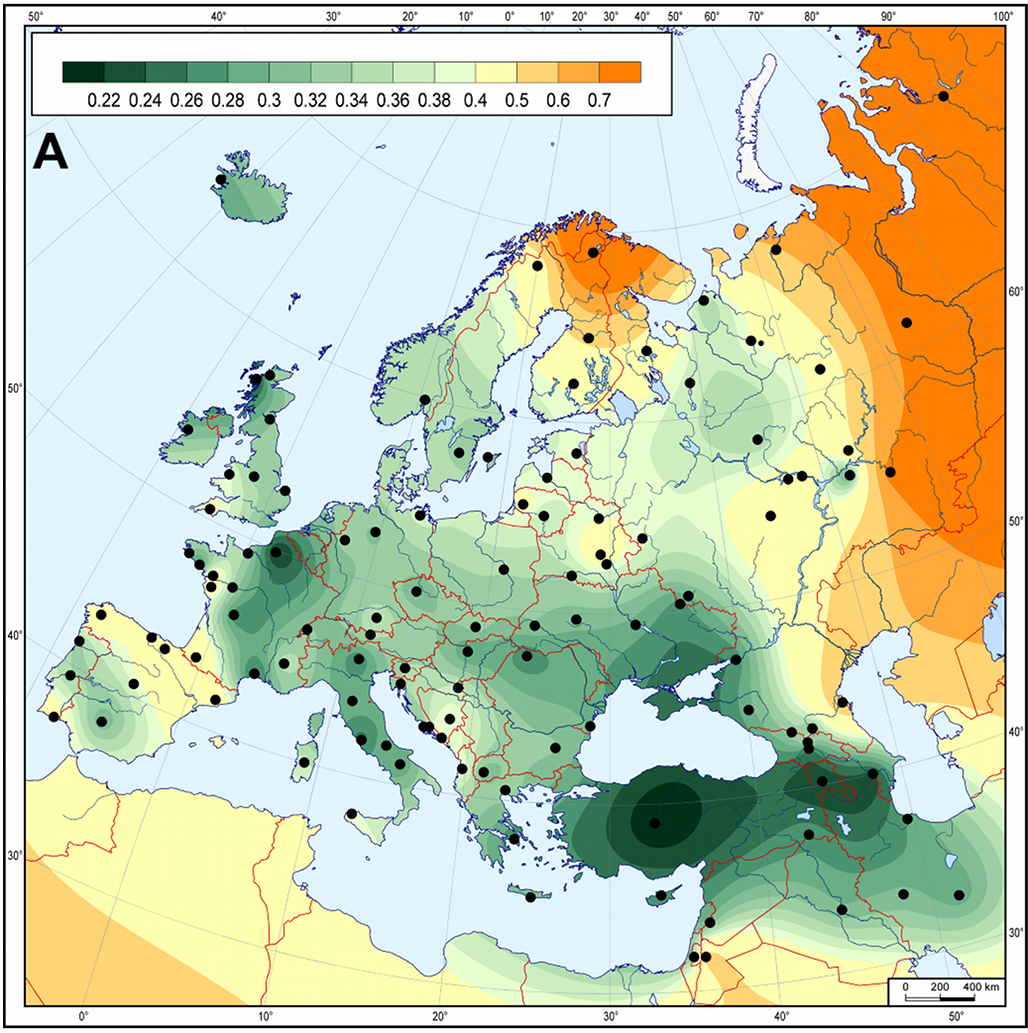
Ancient European Neolithic farmers were genetically closest to modern Near-Eastern/ Anatolian populations. The map shows genetic matrilineal distances between European Neolithic Linear Pottery Culture populations (5,500–4,900 calibrated BP) and modern Western Eurasian populations.

The spread of the Neolithic from the Near East Neolithic to Europe was first studied quantitatively in the 1970s, when a sufficient number of Carbon 14 age determinations for early Neolithic sites had become available. In 1973, Ammerman and Cavalli-Sforza discovered a linear relationship between the age of an Early Neolithic site and its distance from the conventional source in the Near East (Jericho), demonstrating that the Neolithic spread at an average speed of about 1 km/yr. More recent studies (2005) confirm these results and yield the speed of 0.6–1.3 km/yr (at 95% confidence level).

==== Analysis of mitochondrial DNA ====
Since the original human expansions out of Africa 200,000 years ago, different prehistoric and historic migration events have taken place in Europe. Considering that the movement of the people implies a consequent movement of their genes, it is possible to estimate the impact of these migrations through the genetic analysis of human populations. Agricultural and husbandry practices originated 10,000 years ago in a region of the Near East known as the Fertile Crescent. According to the archaeological record this phenomenon, known as "Neolithic", rapidly expanded from these territories into Europe.

However, whether this diffusion was accompanied or not by human migrations is greatly debated. Mitochondrial DNA – a type of maternally inherited DNA located in the cell cytoplasm – was recovered from the remains of Pre-Pottery Neolithic B (PPNB) farmers in the Near East and then compared to available data from other Neolithic populations in Europe and also to modern populations from South Eastern Europe and the Near East. The obtained results show that substantial human migrations were involved in the Neolithic spread and suggest that the first Neolithic farmers entered Europe following a maritime route through Cyprus and the Aegean Islands.

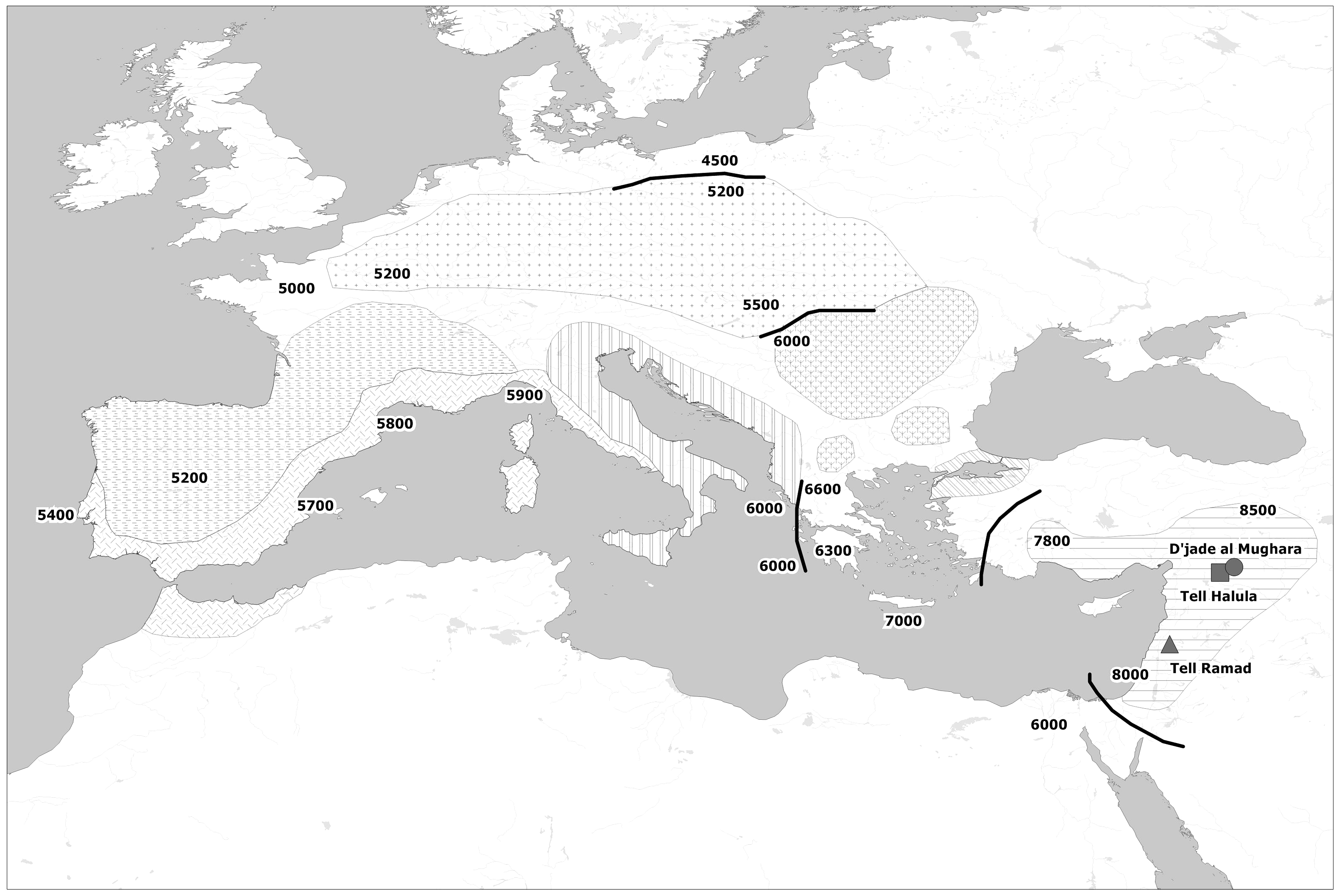
Map of the spread of Neolithic farming cultures from the Near-East to Europe, with dates in year BCE.

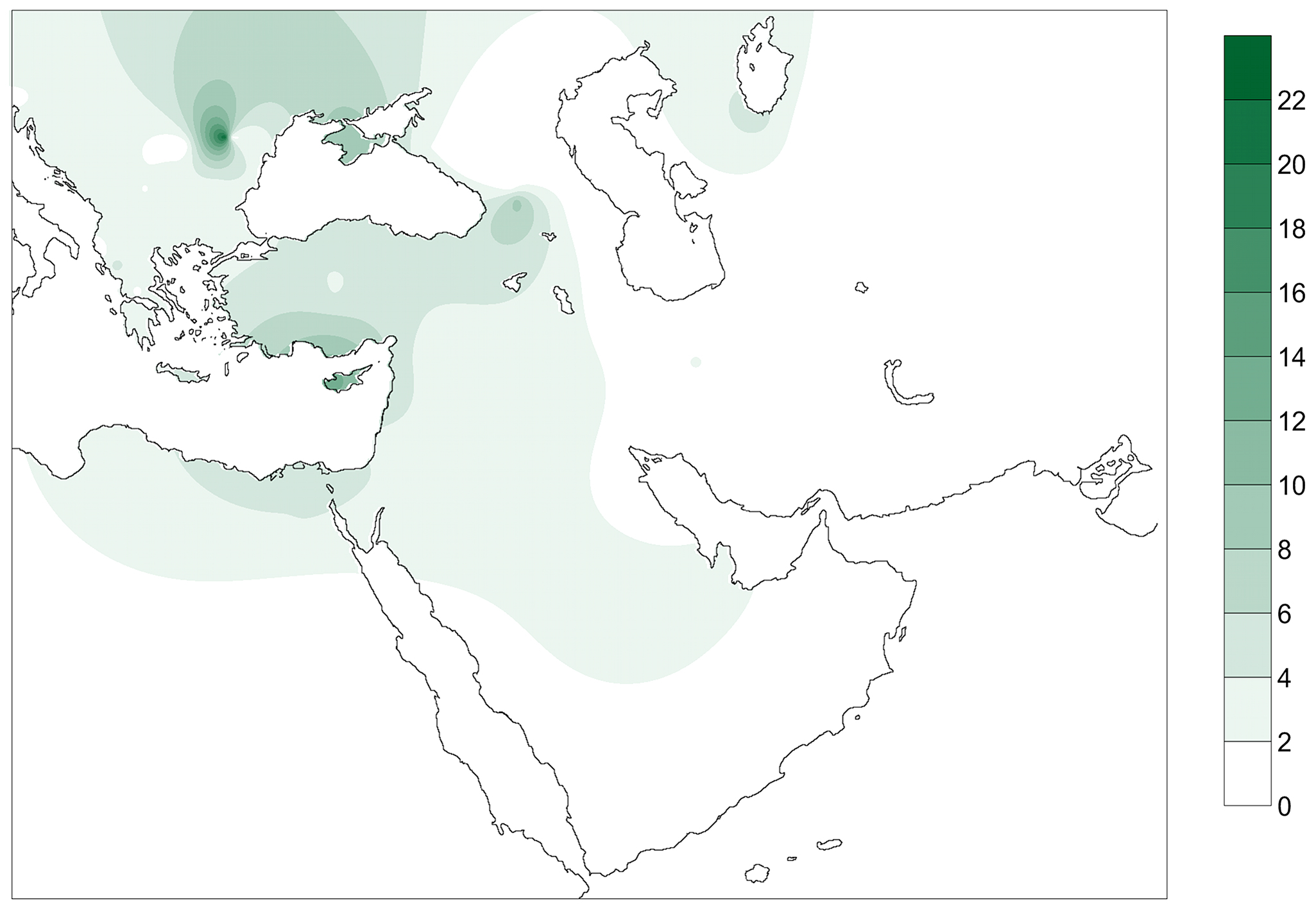
Modern distribution of the haplotypes of PPNB farmers

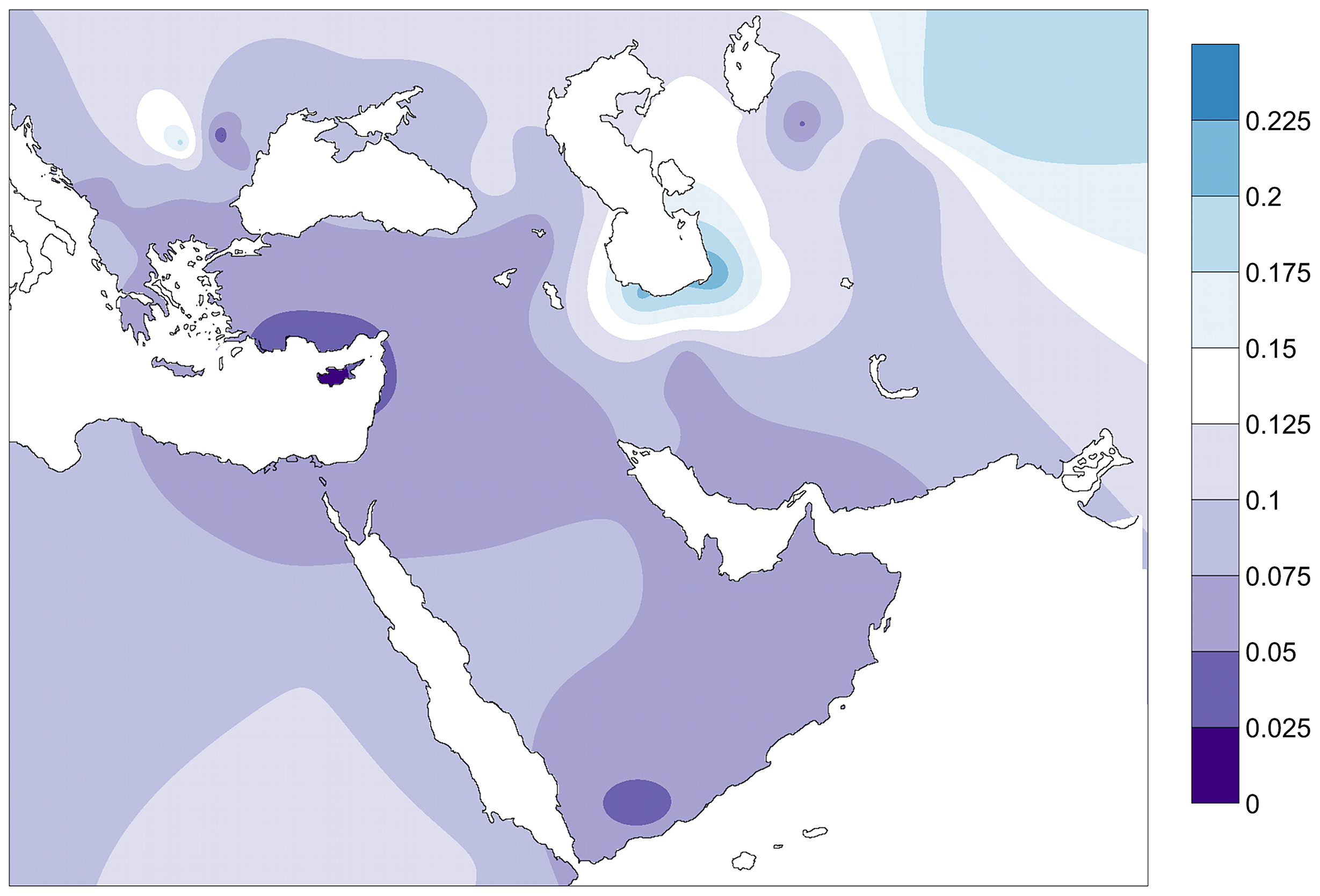
Genetic distance between PPNB farmers and modern populations

=== South Asia ===
Expansion to South Asia

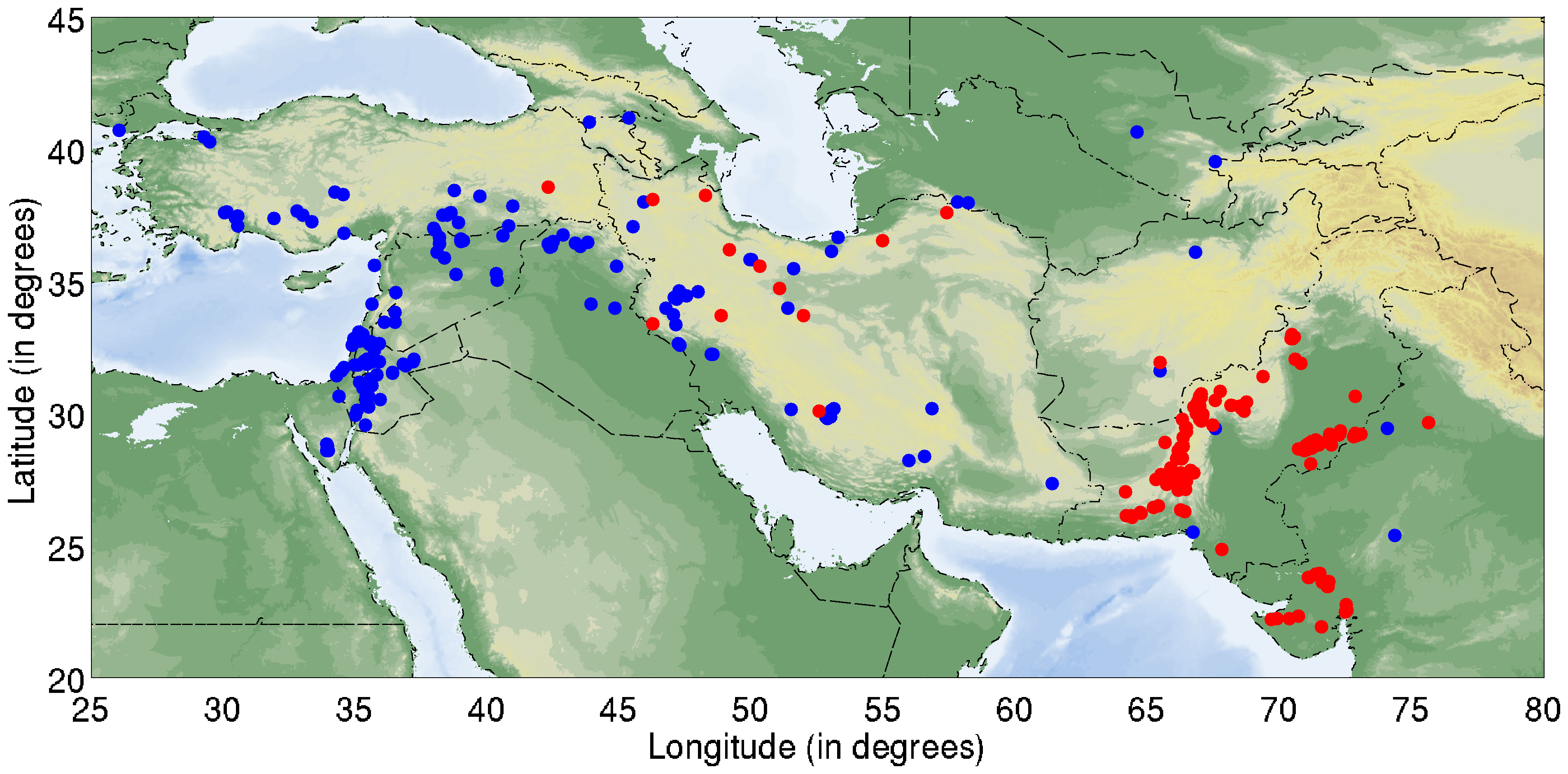
Early Neolithic sites in the Near East and South Asia 10,000–3,800 BP

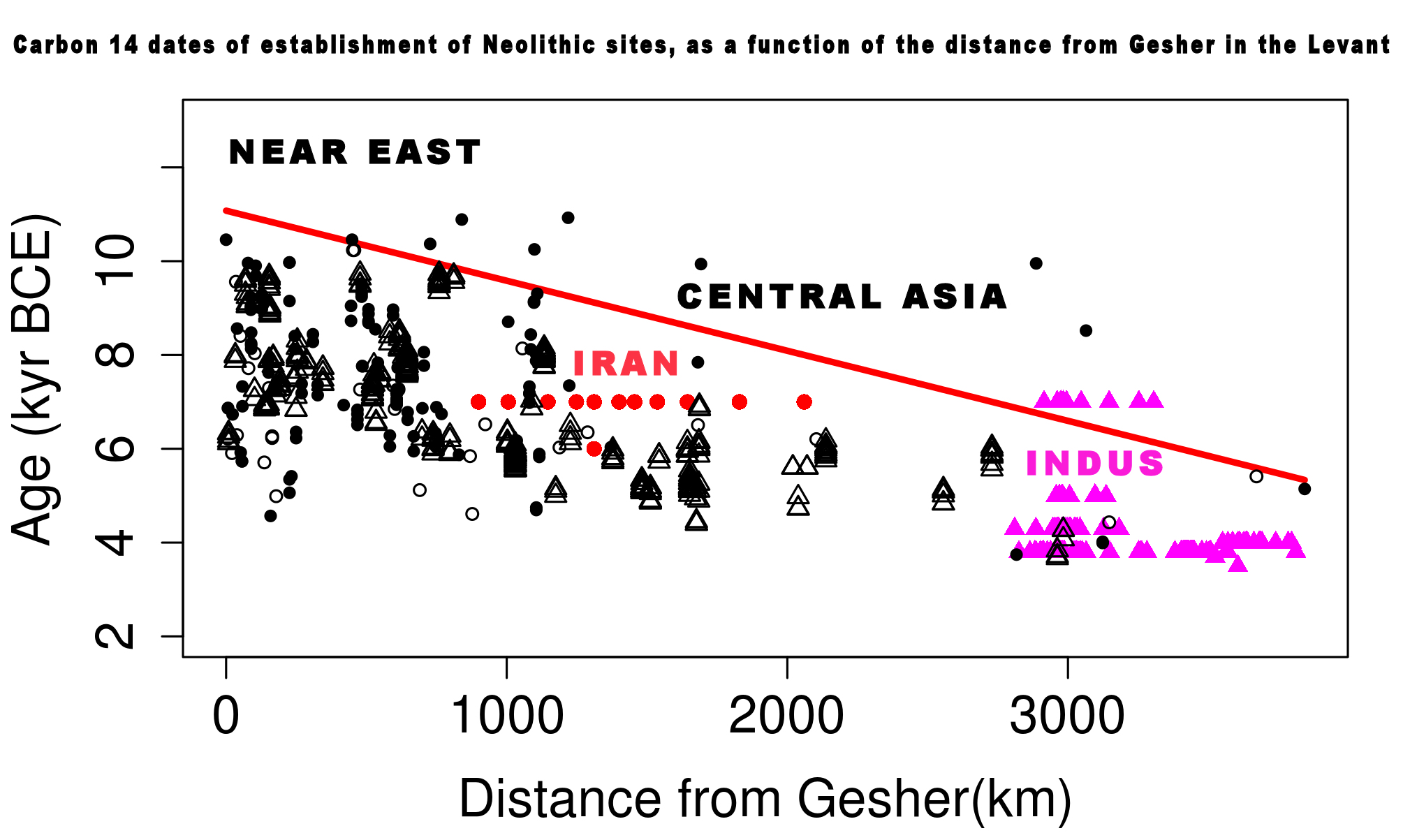
Neolithic dispersal from the Near East to South Asia suggested by the time of establishment of Neolithic sites as a function of distance from Gesher, Israel. The dispersal rate amounts to about 0.6 km per year

The earliest Neolithic site in South Asia is Mehrgarh, dated to between 6500 and 5500 BCE, in the Kachi plain of Balochistan, Pakistan; the site has evidence of farming (wheat and barley) and herding (cattle, sheep and goats).

There is strong evidence for causal connections between the Near-Eastern Neolithic and that further east, up to the Indus Valley. There are several lines of evidence that support the idea of connection between the Neolithic in the Near East and in the Indian subcontinent. The prehistoric site of Mehrgarh in Baluchistan (modern Pakistan) is the earliest Neolithic site in the north-west Indian subcontinent, dated as early as 8500 BCE.

Neolithic domesticated crops in Mehrgarh include more than 90% barley and a small amount of wheat. There is good evidence for the local domestication of barley and the zebu cattle at Mehrgarh, but the wheat varieties are suggested to be of Near-Eastern origin, as the modern distribution of wild varieties of wheat is limited to Northern Levant and Southern Turkey.

A detailed satellite map study of a few archaeological sites in the Baluchistan and Khybar Pakhtunkhwa regions also suggests similarities in early phases of farming with sites in Western Asia. Pottery prepared by sequential slab construction, circular fire pits filled with burnt pebbles, and large granaries are common to both Mehrgarh and many Mesopotamian sites.

The postures of the skeletal remains in graves at Mehrgarh bear strong resemblance to those at Ali Kosh in the Zagros Mountains of southern Iran. Despite their scarcity, the Carbon-14 and archaeological age determinations for early Neolithic sites in Southern Asia exhibit remarkable continuity across the vast region from the Near East to the Indian Subcontinent, consistent with a systematic eastward spread at a speed of about 0.65 km/yr.

== Causes ==
The most prominent of several theories (not mutually exclusive) as to factors that caused populations to develop agriculture include:

- The Oasis Theory, originally proposed by Raphael Pumpelly in 1908, popularized by V. Gordon Childe in 1928 and summarised in Childe's book Man Makes Himself. This theory maintains that as the climate got drier due to the Atlantic depressions shifting northward, communities contracted to oases where they were forced into close association with animals, which were then domesticated together with planting of seeds. However, this theory now has little support amongst archaeologists because subsequent climate data suggests that the region was getting wetter rather than drier.
- The Hilly Flanks hypothesis, proposed by Robert John Braidwood in 1948, suggests that agriculture began in the hilly flanks of the Taurus and Zagros Mountains, where the climate was not drier as Childe had believed, and fertile land supported a variety of plants and animals amenable to domestication.
- The Feasting model by Brian Hayden suggests that agriculture was driven by ostentatious displays of power, such as giving feasts, to exert dominance. This required assembling large quantities of food, which drove agricultural technology.
- The Demographic theories proposed by Carl Sauer and adapted by Lewis Binford and Kent Flannery posit an increasingly sedentary population that expanded up to the carrying capacity of the local environment and required more food than could be gathered. Various social and economic factors helped drive the need for food.
- The evolutionary/intentionality theory, developed by David Rindos and others, considers agriculture as an evolutionary adaptation of plants and humans. Starting with domestication by protection of wild plants, it resulted specialization of location and then complete domestication.
- Peter Richerson, Robert Boyd, and Robert Bettinger make a case for the development of agriculture coinciding with an increasingly stable climate at the beginning of the Holocene. Ronald Wright's book and Massey Lecture Series A Short History of Progress popularized this hypothesis.
- Leonid Grinin argues that whatever plants were cultivated, the independent invention of agriculture always occurred in special natural environments (e.g., South-East Asia). It is supposed that the cultivation of cereals started somewhere in the Near East: in the hills of Israel or Egypt. So Grinin dates the beginning of the agricultural revolution within the interval 12,000 to 9,000 BP, though in some cases the first cultivated plants or domesticated animals' bones are even of a more ancient age of 14–15 thousand years ago.
- Andrew Moore suggested that the Neolithic Revolution originated over long periods of development in the Levant, possibly beginning during the Epipaleolithic. In "A Reassessment of the Neolithic Revolution", Frank Hole further expanded the relationship between plant and animal domestication. He suggested the events could have occurred independently during different periods of time, in as yet unexplored locations. He noted that no transition site had been found documenting the shift from what he termed immediate and delayed return social systems. He noted that the full range of domesticated animals (goats, sheep, cattle and pigs) were not found until the sixth millennium BCE at Tell Ramad. Hole concluded that "close attention should be paid in future investigations to the western margins of the Euphrates basin, perhaps as far south as the Arabian Peninsula, especially where wadis carrying Pleistocene rainfall runoff flowed."

== Consequences ==
=== Social change ===
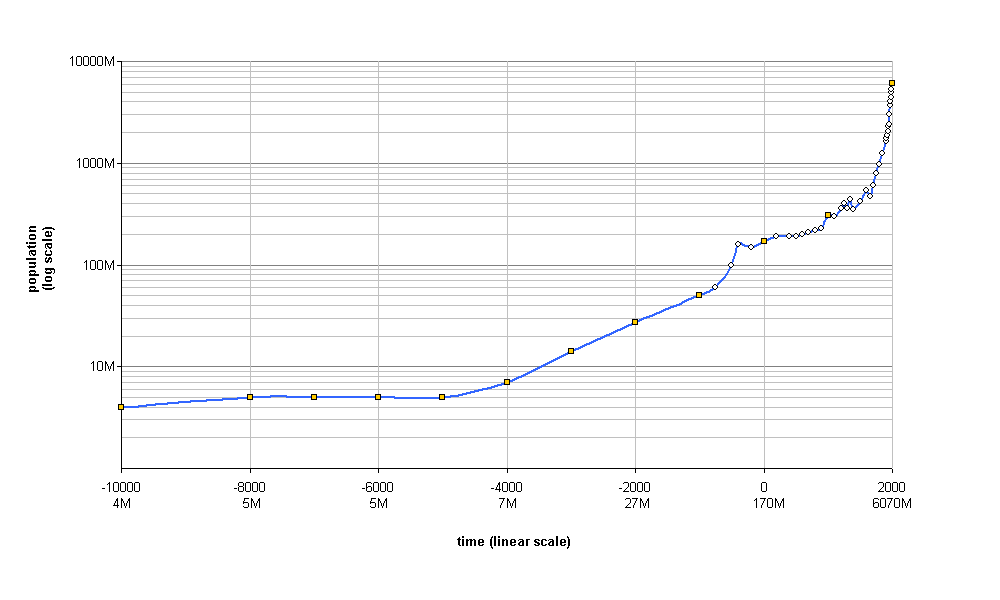
World population (estimated) did not rise for a few millennia after the Neolithic revolution.

Despite the significant technological advance and advancements in knowledge, arts and trade, the Neolithic revolution did not lead immediately to a rapid growth of population. Its benefits appear to have been offset by various adverse effects, mostly diseases and warfare.

The introduction of agriculture has not necessarily led to unequivocal progress. The nutritional standards of the growing Neolithic populations were inferior to that of hunter-gatherers. Several ethnological and archaeological studies conclude that the transition to cereal-based diets caused a reduction in life expectancy and stature, an increase in infant mortality and infectious diseases, the development of chronic, inflammatory or degenerative diseases (such as obesity, type 2 diabetes and cardiovascular diseases) and multiple nutritional deficiencies, including vitamin deficiencies, iron deficiency anemia and mineral disorders affecting bones (such as osteoporosis and rickets) and teeth. Average height for Europeans went down from 178 centimetres (5 ft 10 in) for men and 168 centimetres (5 ft 6 in) for women to 165 and 155 centimetres (5 ft 5 in and 5 ft 1 in) respectively, and it took until the twentieth century for average height for Europeans to return to the pre-Neolithic Revolution levels.

The traditional view is that agricultural food production supported a denser population, which in turn supported larger sedentary communities, the accumulation of goods and tools, and specialization in diverse forms of new labor. Food surpluses made possible the development of a social elite who were not otherwise engaged in agriculture, industry or commerce, but dominated their communities by other means and monopolized decision-making. Nonetheless, larger societies made it more feasible for people to adopt diverse decision making and governance models. Jared Diamond (in The World Until Yesterday) identifies the availability of milk and cereal grains as permitting mothers to raise both an older (e.g. 3 or 4 year old) and a younger child concurrently. The result is that a population can increase more rapidly. Diamond, in agreement with feminist scholars such as V. Spike Peterson, points out that agriculture brought about deep social divisions and encouraged gender inequality. This social reshuffle is traced by historical theorists, like Veronica Strang, through developments in theological depictions. Strang supports her theory through a comparison of aquatic deities before and after the Neolithic Agricultural Revolution, most notably the Venus of Lespugue and the Greco-Roman deities such as Circe or Charybdis: the former venerated and respected, the latter dominated and conquered. The theory, supplemented by the widely accepted assumption from Parsons that "society is always the object of religious veneration", argues that with the centralization of government and the dawn of the Anthropocene, roles within society became more restrictive and were rationalized through the conditioning effect of religion; a process that is crystallized in the progression from polytheism to monotheism.

=== Subsequent revolutions ===
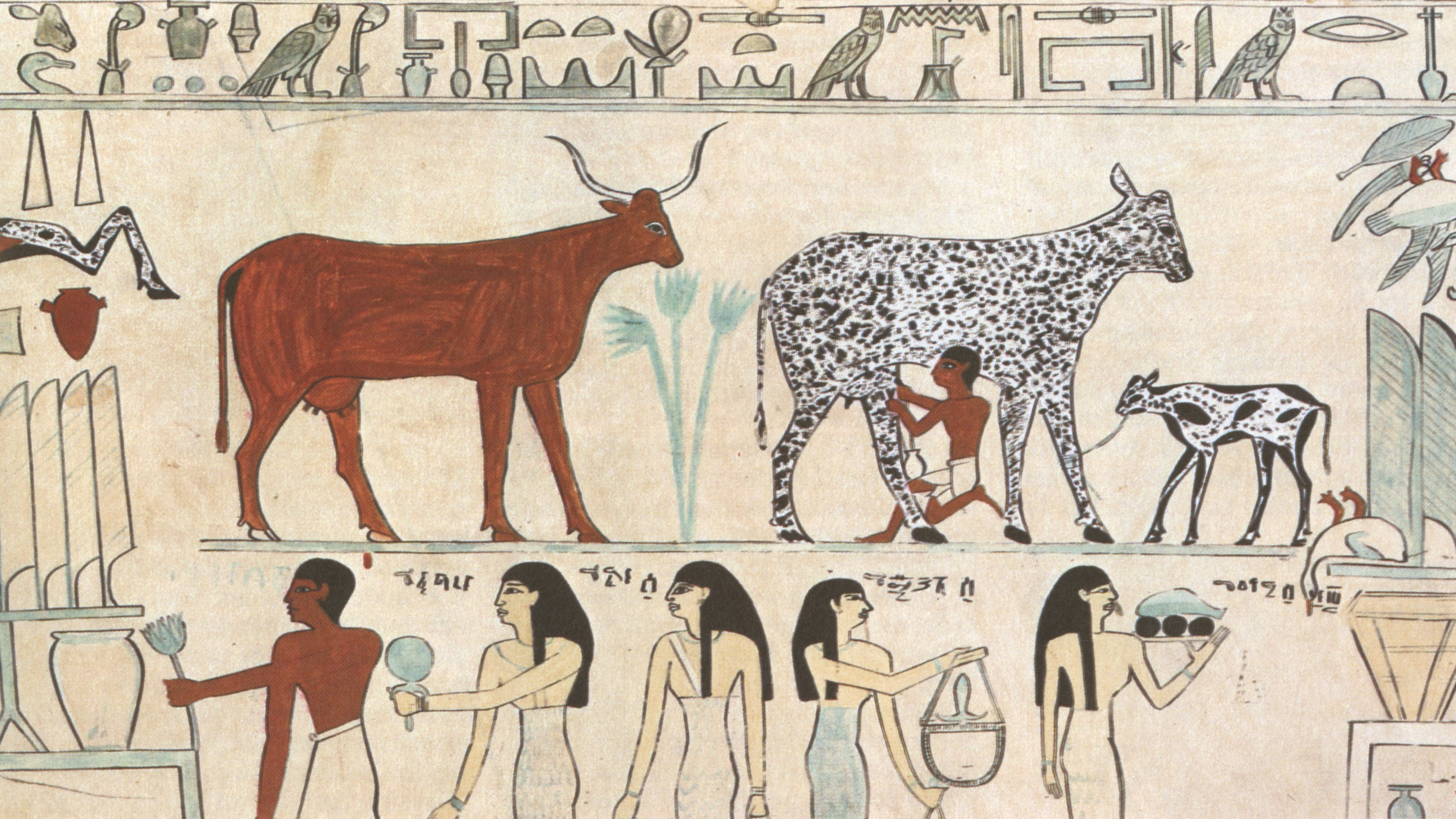
Domesticated cow being milked in Ancient Egypt

Andrew Sherratt has argued that following upon the Neolithic Revolution was a second phase of discovery that he refers to as the secondary products revolution. Animals, it appears, were first domesticated purely as a source of meat. The Secondary Products Revolution occurred when it was recognised that animals also provided a number of other useful products. These included:

- hides and skins (from undomesticated animals)
- manure for soil conditioning (from all domesticated animals)
- wool (from sheep, llamas, alpacas, and Angora goats)
- milk (from goats, cattle, yaks, sheep, horses, and camels)
- traction (from oxen, onagers, donkeys, horses, camels, and dogs)
- guarding and herding assistance (dogs)

Sherratt argued that this phase in agricultural development enabled humans to make use of the energy possibilities of their animals in new ways, and permitted permanent intensive subsistence farming and crop production, and the opening up of heavier soils for farming. It also made possible nomadic pastoralism in semi arid areas, along the margins of deserts, and eventually led to the domestication of both the dromedary and Bactrian camel. Overgrazing of these areas, particularly by herds of goats, greatly extended the areal extent of deserts.

=== Diet and health ===
Compared to foragers, Neolithic farmers' diets were higher in carbohydrates but lower in fibre, micronutrients, and protein. This led to an increase in the frequency of carious teeth and slower growth in childhood and increased body fat, and studies have consistently found that populations around the world became shorter after the transition to agriculture. This trend may have been exacerbated by the greater seasonality of farming diets and with it the increased risk of famine due to crop failure.

Throughout the development of sedentary societies, disease spread more rapidly than it had during the time in which hunter-gatherer societies existed. Inadequate sanitary practices and the domestication of animals may explain the rise in deaths and sickness following the Neolithic Revolution, as diseases jumped from the animal to the human population. Some examples of infectious diseases spread from animals to humans are influenza, smallpox, and measles. Ancient microbial genomics has shown that progenitors to human-adapted strains of Salmonella enterica infected up to 5,500 year old agro-pastoralists throughout Western Eurasia, providing molecular evidence for the hypothesis that the Neolithization process facilitated the emergence of Salmonella entericia.

In concordance with a process of natural selection, the humans who first domesticated the big mammals quickly built up immunities to the diseases as within each generation the individuals with better immunities had better chances of survival. In their approximately 10,000 years of shared proximity with animals, such as cows, Eurasians and Africans became more resistant to those diseases compared with the indigenous populations encountered outside Eurasia and Africa. For instance, the population of most Caribbean and several Pacific Islands have been completely wiped out by diseases. 90% or more of many populations of the Americas were wiped out by European and African diseases before recorded contact with European explorers or colonists. Some cultures like the Inca Empire did have a large domestic mammal, the llama, but llama milk was not drunk, nor did llamas live in a closed space with humans, so the risk of contagion was limited. According to bioarchaeological research, the effects of agriculture on dental health in Southeast Asian rice farming societies from 4000 to 1500 BP was not detrimental to the same extent as in other world regions.

Jonathan C. K. Wells and Jay T. Stock have argued that the dietary changes and increased pathogen exposure associated with agriculture profoundly altered human biology and life history, creating conditions where natural selection favoured the allocation of resources towards reproduction over somatic effort.

== See also ==
- Broad spectrum revolution – Hypothesized increase in dietary range during the Neolithic Revolution
- Green Revolution – Agricultural developments in 1950s–1960s
- Industrial Revolution – 1760–1840 agrarian to industrial era shift
- Secondary products revolution – Widespread and broadly contemporaneous set of innovations in Old World farming
- Upper Paleolithic revolution – The idea that humans not "modern" before 50,000 years ago,
- Urban revolution – Process by which villages transform into urban societies

== Bibliography ==
- Bailey, Douglass. (2001). Balkan Prehistory: Exclusions, Incorporation and Identity. Routledge Publishers. ISBN 0-415-21598-6.
- Bailey, Douglass. (2005). Prehistoric Figurines: Representation and Corporeality in the Neolithic. Routledge Publishers. ISBN 0-415-33152-8.
- Balter, Michael (2005). The Goddess and the Bull: Catalhoyuk, An Archaeological Journey to the Dawn of Civilization. New York: Free Press. ISBN 0-7432-4360-9.
- Bellwood, Peter (2004). First Farmers: The Origins of Agricultural Societies. Blackwell. ISBN 0-631-20566-7.
- Bocquet-Appel, Jean-Pierre, editor and Ofer Bar-Yosef, editor, The Neolithic Demographic Transition and its Consequences, Springer (21 October 2008), hardcover, 544 pages, ISBN 978-1-4020-8538-3, trade paperback and Kindle editions are also available.
- Cohen, Mark Nathan (1977)The Food Crisis in Prehistory: Overpopulation and the Origins of Agriculture. New Haven and London: Yale University Press. ISBN 0-300-02016-3.
- Diamond, Jared (2002). "Evolution, Consequences and Future of Plant and Animal Domestication". Nature, Vol 418.
- Harlan, Jack R. (1992). Crops & Man: Views on Agricultural Origins ASA, CSA, Madison, WI. Hort 306 - READING 3-1
- Wright, Gary A. (1971). "Origins of Food Production in Southwestern Asia: A Survey of Ideas" Current Anthropology, Vol. 12, No. 4/5 (Oct.–Dec. 1971), pp. 447–477
- Kuijt, Ian; Finlayson, Bill. (2009). "Evidence for food storage and predomestication granaries 11,000 years ago in the Jordan Valley". PNAS, Vol. 106, No. 27, pp. 10966–10970.
