= Rindos =

Rindos is a surname. Notable people with the surname include:

- David Rindos (1947–1996), American archaeologist and anthropologist
- Lukáš Rindoš (born 1987), Czech ice hockey player

== See also ==
- Rindo (disambiguation)
- Rindos affair, an academic scandal
- Rindos v Hardwick, an Australian defamation case
