= Jane M. Jacobs =

Australian geographer

Jane Margaret Jacobs (born 2 May 1958) is an Australian academic, and until 2023 served as Professor of Social Sciences at Yale-NUS College and formerly as Professor of Cultural Geography, in the School of Geosciences at the University of Edinburgh. She was previously at the University of Melbourne. She is now an Honorary (Principal Fellow), School of Geography, Earth and Atmospheric Sciences, The University of Melbourne, as well as an adjunct professor at Monash Indonesia. Jacobs' work has focused on Postcolonialism; indigenous rights and identity; race and racism; cultural politics of urban space; high-rise housing and modernity; and the politics of cultural heritage. Jacobs has published several books, many book chapters and articles in peer-reviewed international scholarly journals. In 2016, she was elected a fellow of the British Academy.

== Selected publications ==
=== Books ===
- Gelder, K. and Jacobs, J.M. (1998) Uncanny Australia: Sacredness and Identity in a Postcolonial Nation, University of Melbourne Press, Melbourne
- Jacobs, J.M. (1996) Edge of Empire: Postcolonialism and the city, Routledge, London & New York, 186 pp.
- Jacobs, J.M. and Gale, F. (1994) Tourism and the Protection of Aboriginal Cultural Sites, Australian Heritage Commission, Canberra, 146 pp.
- Gale, F. and Jacobs, J.M. (1987) Tourists and the National Estate: Procedures to Protect Australia's Heritage, Australian Heritage Commission, Canberra, 116 pp.

=== Edited books ===
- Fincher, R. and Jacobs, J.M. (1998) Cities of Difference, Guilford, New York, 322 pp.
- Gibson, K., Huxley, M., Cameron, J., Costello, L., Fincher, R., Jacobs, J.M., Jamieson, N., Johnson, L. and Pulvirenti, M. (1996) Restructuring Difference: Social Polarisation and the city, Australian Housing and Urban Research Institute, Melbourne, 114 pp.
- Jacobs, J.M. and Liepins, R. (1994) Rural Women: Exploring Research Agendas. In Department of geography and Environmental Studies, University of Melbourne, Research Paper 1, Melbourne, 45 pp.
