= Fay Gale =

Australian geographer and university administrator (1932–2008)

Fay Gale AO FASSA

15th Vice-Chancellor of the University of Western Australia
- In office 1990 – 19 December 1997
- Chancellor: Donald Aitken; Geoffrey Kennedy
- Preceded by: Robert Smith
- Succeeded by: Deryck Schreuder

Personal details
- Born: Gwendoline Fay Gilding; 13 June 1932 Balaklava, South Australia, Australia
- Died: 3 May 2008 (aged 75) Adelaide, South Australia, Australia
- Spouse: Milton Gale (m. 1957, divorced)
- Children: 2
- Education: Methodist Ladies' College; University of Adelaide (BA; PhD)
- Occupation: Geographer; university administrator

Academic background
- Thesis: A Study of Assimilation: Part Aborigines in South Australia (1960)
- Doctoral advisor: Grenfell Price; Graham Lawton

Academic work
- Discipline: Geography
- Sub-discipline: Cultural geography; Human geography; Indigenous studies
- Institutions: University of Adelaide; University of Western Australia

Gwendoline Fay Gale (née Gilding; 13 June 1932 – 3 May 2008) was an Australian geographer and university administrator specialising in cultural geography, human geography and indigenous studies. She was the first female professor of the University of Adelaide (UofA) and vice-chancellor of the University of Western Australia (UWA) between 1990 and 1997. Her scholarly work concerned the situation of Aboriginal Australians and equal opportunities for women in higher education.

Gale was born in Balaklava, South Australia, and educated at Methodist Ladies' College in Adelaide. She completed her studies at UofA, earning Bachelor of Arts degree in 1952 and first-class honours in geography in 1954. Afterwards, she pursued her doctoral studies under Grenfell Price and Graham Lawton. The title of her PhD thesis was A Study of Assimilation: Part Aborigines in South Australia. It covered the experiences of part Aboriginal people and criticised the policy of the government and church.

Gale started working for UofA as a lecturer in geography in 1966. She was made senior lecturer in 1971, reader in 1975 and professor in 1978. She was the university's first female pro-vice-chancellor in 1988 but left it for vice-chancellorship of UWA in 1990. She was the second woman vice-chancellor of Australia and the first woman who headed a sandstone university. She was also the first woman president of the Australian Vice-Chancellors' Committee from 1996 to 1997.

== Early life and education ==
Gwendoline Fay Gilding was born on 13 June 1932 in Balaklava, South Australia, the fourth child of Methodist minister Jasper Gilding and his wife, Kathleen (née Pengelley). The family lived in different locations due to the work of her father before moving to Adelaide when she was around four years old. She went to Magill Primary School, Rosefield Primary School and Methodist Ladies' College in Adelaide. Gale suffered from dyslexia and as a child, preferred maps over books.

During her childhood, Gale's family allowed Aboriginal people who came to Adelaide from mission settlements to stay with them. Edna Walker, Linda Vale and Gladys Mayne who were taken away from their families in Northern Territory became Gale's foster sisters and lifelong friends. Her connection with them and especially Walker who belonged to the Stolen Generations and knowing how they were discriminated against inspired Gale's research.

Gale studied arts at the University of Adelaide (UofA) and graduated with Bachelor of Arts degree in 1952 and a first-class honours arts degree in 1954. She was the university's first honours graduate in geography.

== Academic career ==
=== Teaching and doctoral research (1957–1970) ===
Having graduated from university, Gale lectured at Walford Church of England Girls' School, teaching students such as Margaret Clunies Ross. In 1957, she undertook postgraduate studies at the same university under the guidance of Grenfell Price and Graham Lawton, with fieldwork conducted for three years by travelling around rural South Australia and working in Aboriginal communities, fringe camps and government reserves.

In 1962, Gale became the first geography PhD of UofA. Her thesis was entitled A Study of Assimilation: Part Aborigines in South Australia, and it covered the life of Aboriginal people of part descent, particularly children who were separated from their mothers. This study was published in 1964, and it revealed inequality and criticised policies of the government and churches which were protectionist and segregationist. That year, Gale became a member of the Australian Institute of Aboriginal and Torres Strait Islander Studies.

During the 1960s, Gale continued studying Aboriginal families of Adelaide, establishing social networks such as the Aboriginal Women's Centre. She took up her lectureship position in geography at UofA in 1966 following the births of her two children. In 1969, Gale co-authored Settlement and Encounter with Lawton and Woman's Role in Aboriginal Society in 1970.

=== Professorship and research (1971–1989) ===
In 1971, Gale was promoted to the position of senior lecturer. In 1972, she was visiting lecturer at the School of Geography at the University of Oxford. In 1972, she authored the book Urban Aborigines that highlighted the plight of aboriginals living in the cities and called for their self-determination. In 1973, she carried out research on aboriginal poverty for the Whitlam government's Commission of Inquiry into Poverty. In 1975, she was made a reader in geography.

In 1978, Gale became the first woman to receive a professorial appointment at a university in South Australia, as well as the first woman ever to become a professor of geography at an Australian university. Furthermore, she became a visiting professor of the University of Washington.

Throughout the 1980s, Gale worked with Joy Wundersitz and Ngaire Naffine on studies of Aboriginal youth interactions with the criminal justice system. Among her works are the books Adelaide Aborigines: A Case Study of Urban Life, 1966–1981, co-authored with Wundersitz and published in 1982, the edited volume We Are Bosses Ourselves from 1983, and Aboriginal Youth and the Law from 1985.

Gale was a supporter of giving more recognition to women in research and university life. Speaking at a seminar on the Academy of the Social Sciences in Australia (ASSA), she outlined the repercussions of ignoring the power of Aboriginal women over the culturally important land. In 1981, along with Alison Mackinnon and Jill Thomas, she contacted the academic board of UofA regarding the situation of female academic personnel. Gale's action helped to create a working party on the status of women. As a result, the non-sexist language policy was produced as well as the proposal to set up a Research Centre for Women's Studies. Later she fought against the attempts of closing the center.

Rock art at Ubirr in Kakadu National Park

Collaborating with Jane M. Jacobs and her students, she studied the impact of tourism on Aboriginal rock art sites including those in Kakadu National Park. Gale and Jacobs issued Tourists and the National Estate in 1987. In 1988, she was appointed pro-vice-chancellor of UofA, becoming the first woman in senior management in the university. She served as the first female president of the Institute of Australian Geographers (IAG) from 1989 to 1990 and as a member of the Australian Heritage Commission from 1989 to 1995.

=== University of Western Australia (1990–1997) ===
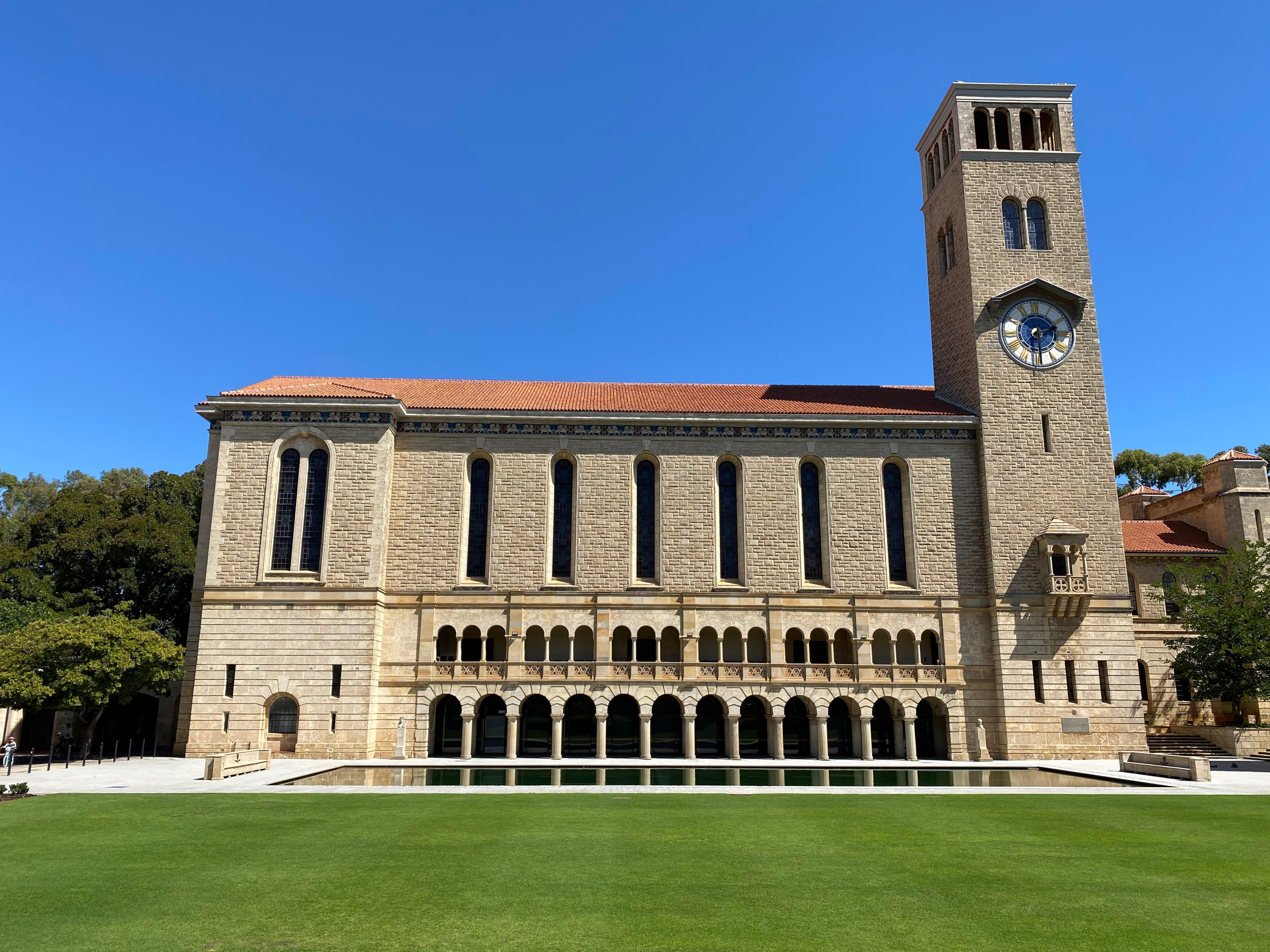
Winthrop Hall at the University of Western Australia, on 18 February 2023

In 1990, Gale became the vice-chancellor of the University of Western Australia (UWA), serving as the second female vice-chancellor in Australia as well as the first woman to head a sandstone university. She made moves aimed at enhancing the opportunities of the women, such as introducing childcare facilities, increasing campus security, as well as supporting those who had experienced sexual assaults. Gale even repealed a by-law that barred children from entering university premises and conducted research on women's experiences in doctoral supervision. In that year, Gale authored the book entitled Aboriginal Youth and the Criminal Justice System in conjunction with Rebecca Bailey-Harris and Wundersitz.

In 1991, Gale, together with Ian Lowe, delivered the Australian Broadcasting Corporation's Boyer Lectures, which were entitled A Changing Australia. Her later publications include Cultural Geographies, co-authored with Kay Anderson in 1992; Juvenile Justice: Debating the Issues, co-authored with Naffine and Wundersitz in 1993; and Tourism and the Protection of Aboriginal Cultural Sites, co-written with Jacobs in 1994.

In June 1993, Gale agreed with the tenure committee's recommendation against awarding tenure to archaeology lecturer David Rindos. According to a statement released on 29 June, it was based on evaluations of his academic performance, the future of the program, and problems working with colleagues. Gale clarified in her letter to staff of the university on 30 June that no personal relationship between students and staff had played any part in the decision. She reiterated that denial of tenure had nothing to do with Rindos's grievances about the management of the archaeology department.

However, Gale's previous work was taken into account by the Hindmarsh Island Royal Commission in 1995, during which she gave evidence to the inquiry. It brought negative reaction from the representatives of the government and the press. Elected in 1995, Gale was appointed the first female president of the Australian Vice-Chancellors' Committee from 1996 to 1997. As the president, she strongly criticised the university amalgamation policies of John Dawkins and university funding and fees of Amanda Vanstone.

An internal inquiry was initiated by UWA in February 1996 as a result of publicity regarding the Rindos affair. It found problems in the process, yet defended Gale's decisions. On 22 April, she testified at the public hearings conducted by a Western Australian parliamentary committee, delivering her opening statement prior to being asked any questions by the committee. During May, she defended the decision regarding tenure based on Rindos' performance in research and teaching. She also said that there had been an investigation, removal from his position and closure of the department due to student complaints against Sandra Bowdler who was its head, but said that these were separate issues from Rindos' tenure proceedings.

The parliamentary committee released its report on 4 December 1997, stating that Rindos had not been given sufficient chance to state his case and the procedures for tenure and appeal processes had been not sufficiently fair in regard to procedural fairness. In the university statement released the same day, Gale denied the allegations, saying that it was not proved that UWA used the information which was not accessible to Rindos and that the parliamentary committee did not provide procedural fairness to the university. She also criticised the report for its factual accuracy.

In 1997, she created the Fay Gale Fellowship for A$1 million in order to help academic researchers who have family duties hindering their career. At her farewell celebration on 5 December, the deputy vice-chancellor Alan Robson highlighted her achievements in terms of improving the status of women in UWA where there are now sixteen female professors instead of two as before. She retired as vice-chancellor on 19 December 1997.

Other positions she held were chairperson of the Perth Festival Board of Management and the advisory board of the West Australian Symphony Orchestra. She was also a consultant for the Australian National Parks and Wildlife Service, the NSW National Parks, and the National Arthritis and Musculoskeletal Conditions Advisory Group.

=== Later life and death (1998–2008) ===
Between 1 January 1998 and 1 January 2000, Gale was president of ASSA. In 1999, she became a member of the Australian Research Council and UNESCO's National Committee. Gale was the second patron of the Association for Tertiary Education Management (ATEM) from 2000 to 2002, succeeded by Peter Karmel. She attended all conferences every year during that period and also participated in South Australian branch events.

Gale was the patron of ASSA from 2001 to 2003 and the president of the Association of Asian Social Science Research Councils from 2001 to 2004. Some of her other roles were that of the member of the Prime Minister's Science and Engineering Council. She was also the first woman to be elected on the council of the Association of Commonwealth Universities.

Gale died on 3 May 2008 at the age of 75 in Adelaide. A memorial service took place at Wesley Uniting Church in Kent Town on 4 June. Orange, green and purple balloons were released by her grandchildren in honor of her contribution in Aboriginal rights, awareness of the environment and equal rights for women.

== Personal life ==
Gale first met Milton Ewart Gale in 1950, as he was training to be a Methodist minister. They got married in 1957, and he later became a teacher. Her attendants at the wedding were Mayne and Vale. The couple had two children, Marie and Michael.

Gale became the breadwinner of her family in 1969 after her husband suffered a heart attack. After their divorce, she became the sole parent of their children.

== Honours and awards ==
In 1971, Gale received the Elin Wägner Fellowship and the Catherine Helen Spence Memorial Scholarship. She was elected a Fellow of the Academy of the Social Sciences in Australia (FASSA) in 1978. In 1989, Gale was made an Officer of the Order of Australia (AO) for her services to the social sciences, especially geography and Aboriginal studies.

In 1993, Gale was awarded the fellowship of the IAG, and in 1994, the honorary degree of Doctor of the University from UofA. She was made an honorary life member of the IAG in 1996 and received the honorary Doctor of Letters from UWA in 1998.

In 2000, Gale won the John Lewis Gold Medal from the South Australian Branch of the Royal Geographical Society of Australasia. In 2001, she was conferred the Honorary FASSA and also received the Griffith Taylor Medal by the IAG. An honorary fellowship from ATEM was awarded to her in 2003. Gale was awarded the UofA's Distinguished Alumni Award posthumously in 2008 for her achievements in teaching, women's studies, university equity, human geography, and Indigenous Australians' studies. Amongst the awards she won were the British Council Award.

== Legacy ==
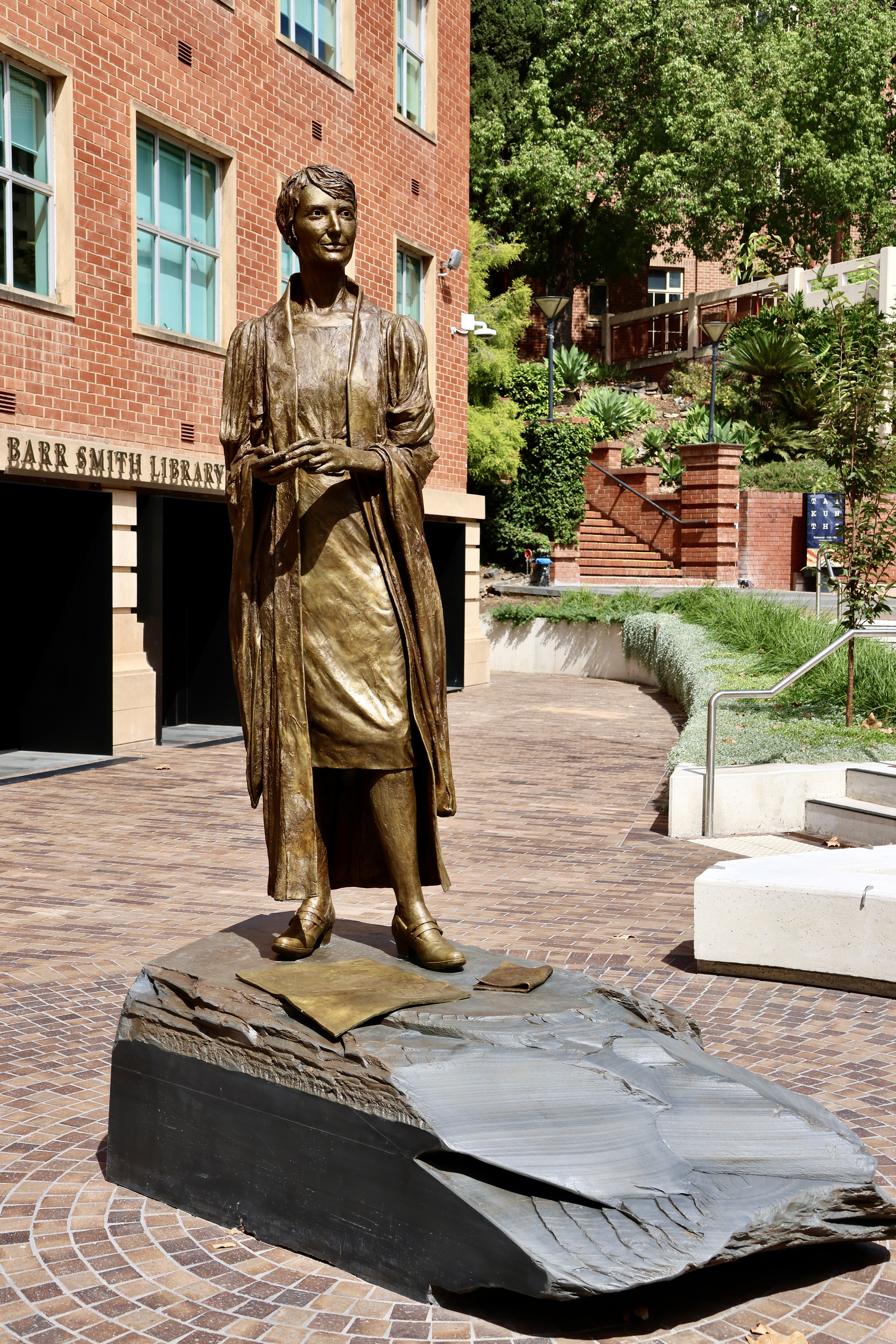
Statue of Gale at UofA's North Terrace campus, 22 March 2025

In the year she died, IAG created the Fay Gale Memorial Lecture, which is given annually at its conference by a distinguished young researcher of Australia. UofA created the Fay Gale Centre for Research on Gender in 2009. In 2010, the ASSA began the Fay Gale Lecture, which is an annual lecture presented by a distinguished female social scientist.

The Fay Gale Fellowships at UWA offer financial assistance to academic and professional staff members at the beginning of their careers who wish to participate in career development activities such as attending conferences either interstate or abroad. The same university also named the Fay Gale Studio at Hackett Hall in the university's Crawley campus in honour of her.

A statue of Gale was unveiled at UofA in 2025, on the occasion of International Women's Day. This is the first statue of any woman on any of the university's campuses and celebrates her contribution to social sciences and gender equality. The statue is located in the Barr Smith Lawns of the North Terrace campus. The bronze on engraved Mintaro slate statue was created by Meliesa Judge from Liquid Metal Studios from 2024 to 2025. The university had commissioned this artwork as part of their North Terrace Campus Public Realm Plan. The commission was managed by Guildhouse and Judge was chosen as the artist through a shortlisting process.

== Selected publications ==
As of 2002, Gale has written 17 books/monographs, 30 book chapters in various edited volumes, and 35 papers in refereed journals along with various conference and consultancy reports.

=== Books ===
==== Authored ====
- Gale, Fay (1964). A Study of Assimilation: Part-Aborigines in South Australia. Libraries Board of South Australia.
- Gale, Fay (1972). Urban Aborigines. Assisted by Alison Brookman. ANU Press.
- Gale, Fay; Brookman, Alison (1975). Race Relations in Australia: The Aborigines. McGraw Hill.
- Gale, Fay; Wundersitz, Joy (1982). Adelaide Aborigines: A Case Study of Urban Life, 1966–1981. Australian National University.
- Gale, Fay; Jacobs, Jane M. (1987). Tourists and the National Estate: Procedures to Protect Australia's Heritage. Australian Heritage Commission.
- Gale, Fay; Bailey-Harris, Rebecca; Wundersitz, Joy (1990). Aboriginal Youth and the Criminal Justice System: The Injustice of Justice?. Cambridge University Press.
- Gale, Fay; Jacobs, Jane M. (1994). Tourism and the Protection of Aboriginal Cultural Sites. Australian Heritage Commission.

==== Edited ====
- Gale, Fay, ed. (1970). Woman's Role in Aboriginal Society. Australian Institute of Aboriginal Studies.
- Gale, Fay, ed. (1983). We Are Bosses Ourselves: The Status and Role of Aboriginal Women Today. Australian Institute of Aboriginal Studies.
- Anderson, Kay; Gale, Fay, eds. (1992). Inventing Places: Studies in Cultural Geography. Longman Cheshire.
- Gale, Fay; Naffine, Ngaire; Wundersitz, Joy, eds. (1993). Juvenile Justice: Debating the Issues. Allen & Unwin.

=== Journal articles ===
- Gale, Fay (1968). "Foster Homes for Aboriginal Children". Australian Social Work. 21 (1): 8–14. doi:10.1080/03124076808549225.
- Gale, Fay (1985). "Monitoring Visitor Behaviour at Rock Art Sites". Rock Art Research. 2 (2): 112–118.
- Gale, Fay; Wundersitz, Joy (1986). "Aboriginal Visibility in the 'System'". Australian Social Work. 39 (1): 21–26. doi:10.1080/03124078608549820.
- Gale, Fay; Jacobs, Jane M. (1987). "Aboriginal Art—Australia's Neglected Inheritance". World Archaeology. 19 (2): 226–235.
- Gale, Fay; Wundersitz, Joy (1987). "Police and Black Minorities: The Case of Aboriginal Youth in South Australia". Australian and New Zealand Journal of Criminology. 20 (2): 78–94. doi:10.1177/000486588702000203.
- Wundersitz, Joy; Naffine, Ngaire; Gale, Fay (1988). "Chivalry, Justice or Paternalism? The Female Offender in the Juvenile Justice System". The Australian and New Zealand Journal of Sociology. 24 (3): 359–376. doi:10.1177/144078338802400301.
- Naffine, Ngaire; Gale, Fay (1989). "Testing the Nexus: Crime, Gender, and Unemployment". The British Journal of Criminology. 29 (2): 144–156. doi:10.1093/oxfordjournals.bjc.a047812.
- Gale, Fay (1990). "The Participation of Australian Aboriginal Women in a Changing Political Environment". Political Geography Quarterly. 9 (4): 381–395. doi:10.1016/0260-9827(90)90035-9.
- Wundersitz, Joy; Naffine, Ngaire; Gale, Fay (1991). "The Production of Guilt in the Juvenile Justice System: The Pressures to 'Plead'". The Howard Journal of Criminal Justice. 30 (3): 192–206. doi:10.1111/j.1468-2311.1991.tb00708.x.
- Gale, Fay (2003). "Textbooks That Moved Generations". Progress in Human Geography. 27 (2): 233–236. doi:10.1191/0309132503ph425xx.

Academic offices
Preceded by Robert Smith	15th Vice-Chancellor of the University of Western Australia; 1990–1997	Succeeded by Deryck Schreuder
