= Susan Sherratt =

Scottish archaeologist (born 1949)

Susan Sherratt FSA FSA Scot
- Born: Elizabeth Susan Dobson; 26 September 1949 (age 77); Houston, Scotland
- Education: New Hall, Cambridge; Somerville College, Oxford
- Employer: University of Sheffield
- Known for: archaeologist of Bronze Age Greece, Cyprus, and the eastern Mediterranean
- Spouse: Andrew Sherratt (m. 1974; died 2006)

Susan Sherratt FSA FSA Scot (born 26 September 1949) is Professor Emerita of East Mediterranean Archaeology at the University of Sheffield. Her research focuses on the archaeology of the Bronze and Early Iron Ages of the Aegean, Cyprus and the eastern Mediterranean, especially trade and interaction within and beyond these regions.

== Early life and education ==
Elizabeth Susan Sherratt (née Dobson; known as Sue), was born on 26 September 1949 in Houston, Renfrewshire. She studied for a BA in Classics at New Hall (now Murray Edwards College), University of Cambridge, from 1968 to 1971, and then moved to Somerville College, University of Oxford, for a Postgraduate Diploma in Classical Archaeology (1973) and a DPhil on 12th century BCE Mycenaean pottery, supervised by Mervyn Popham (1982).

== Academic career ==
After completing her DPhil, Sherratt held a range of academic positions in Oxford including as a research assistant on various projects, Sackler Research Fellow (1993-1995), Director of Studies for Archaeology and Anthropology for several colleges (1994-2002), and Assistant Curator and Honorary Research Assistant to the Arthur Evans Archive in the Ashmolean Museum. In 2004 she held a Visiting Fellowship at Heidelberg University, and took up an Academic Fellowship and then a permanent lectureship in the Department of Archaeology at Sheffield in 2005. She has published on a wide range of topics in Late Bronze Age Greek, Cypriot, and eastern Mediterranean archaeology, including the economy of pottery, metals, and other aspects of material culture; the relationship between the Homeric epics and archaeological evidence; trade and other cultural interactions; and the history of museums and collecting. She is a member of the Sinop Regional Archaeological Project, which is investigating long-term patterns of land-use and settlement and communication networks in the Black Sea coastal region of Sinop, Turkey, and of the Palaepapphos Urban Landscape Project studying the site of Ancient Paphos.

A collected volume of essays celebrating Sherratt's important contributions to archaeology, 'ΑΘΥΡΜΑΤΑ Critical Essays on the Archaeology of the Eastern Mediterranean in Honour of E. Susan Sherratt', was published in 2014. In the same year, Sherratt was awarded a Senior Research Fellowship by the British Academy for the project 'Silver before coinage: a history of silver from the fifth millennium to the mid-first millennium BC'. She is a Fellow of the Society of Antiquaries and of the Society of Antiquaries of Scotland.

== Personal life ==
Sherratt married Andrew Sherratt, also an archaeologist and Assistant Keeper of Antiquities in the Ashmolean Museum, in 1974; they had two sons and one daughter, and published articles together on topics such as Indo-European origins, the economy of the eastern Mediterranean, relationships between the Aegean and the wider world, technological change and exchange.

== Selected publications ==
=== Books ===
- Catalogue of Cycladic Antiquities in the Ashmolean Museum. The Captive Spirit. Oxford: Oxford University Press, 2000.
- Arthur Evans, Knossos and the Priest-King. Oxford: Ashmolean Museum, 2000.

=== Edited volumes ===
- Archaeology and Homeric Epic. Oxford: Oxbow Books, 2017 (with John Bennet)
- Minotaur and Centaur. Studies in the Archaeology of Crete and Euboea presented to Mervyn Popham. Oxford: Tempus Reparatum, 1996 (with Doniert Evely and Irene S. Lemos).
- Proceedings of the First International Symposium, The Wall Paintings of Thera. Athens: Thera Foundation, 2000.
- Autochthon. Papers presented to O.T.P.K. Dickinson on the Occasion of his Retirement. Oxford: Archaeopress, 2005 (with Anastasia Dakouri-Hild)
- Interweaving Worlds: Systemic Interactions in Eurasia, 7th to 1st Millennia BC. Oxford: Oxbow, 2011 (with Toby C. Wilkinson and John Bennet)

=== Articles ===
- "Sinop Regional Archaeological Project: report on the 2010-2012 field seasons" in S. Steadman and G. McMahon (eds.), The Archaeology of Anatolia: Current Work, Cambridge: Cambridge Scholars Press, 2015, 298-327 (with O. Doonan, A. Bauer, A. Casson, J. Feathers, M. Conrad, M. Besonen, E. Evren, K. Domzalski and A. Smokotina).
- "Cyprus and the Near East: cultural contacts (1200-750 BC)" in A. Babbi, F. Bubenheimer-Erhart, B. Marin-Aguilera and S. Mühl (eds.), The Mediterranean Mirror. Cultural Contacts in the Mediterranean Sea between 1200 and 750 B.C., Mainz: Römisch-Germanischen Zentralmuseum, 2015, 71-83.
- "The ceramic phenomenon of the 'Sea Peoples': an overview" in A.E. Killebrew and G. Lehmann (eds), The Philistines and Other "Sea Peoples" in Text and Archaeology, Atlanta: Society of Biblical Literature, 2013, 619-44.
- "Late Cypriot writing in context" in P.M. Steele (ed.), Syllabic Writing on Cyprus and its Context, Cambridge: Cambridge University Press, 2013, 77-105.
- "Feasting and the consuming body in Bronze Age Crete and Early Iron Age Cyprus" in G. Cadogan, M. Iacovou, K. Kopaka and J. Whitley (eds), Parallel Lives. Ancient Island Societies in Crete and Cyprus, London: British School at Athens, 2012, 187-207 (with Yannis Hamilakis).
- "The intercultural transformative capacities of irregularly appropriated goods" in J. Maran and P.W. Stockhammer (eds), Materiality and Social Practice. Transformative Capacities of Intercultural Encounters, Oxford: Oxbow Books, 2012, 152-72.
- "Between theory, texts and archaeology: working with the shadows" in K. Duistermaat and I. Regulski (eds), Intercultural Contacts in the Ancient Mediterranean, Leuven: Peeters, 2011, 3-29.
- "Greeks and Phoenicians: perceptions of trade and traders in the early 1st millennium BC" in A. Bauer and A. Agbe-Davies (eds), Trade as Social Interaction: New Archaeological Approaches, Walnut Creek: Left Coast Press, 2010, 119-42.
- "The Aegean and the wider world: some thoughts on a world-systems perspective" in M. Galaty and W. Parkinson (eds), Archaic State Interaction: The Eastern Mediterranean in the Bronze Age, Santa Fe: School for Advanced Research Press, 2010, 81-106.
- "Homer’s Trojan War: history or bricolage?" Bulletin of the Institute of Classical Studies 53:2 (2010), 1-18.
