= Rindo =

Rindo may refer to:

== People ==
- Makoto Rindo (b.1989), a Japanese football player

== Place ==
- Rindö, an island in the Stockholm Archipelago, Sweden
- Rindö (locality), an urban area situated on the island of Rindö

== Other ==
- Rindo Chihaya Japanese-speaking Virtual YouTuber affiliated with Hololive Production

== See also ==
- Rindos
