= Secondary products revolution =

Widespread and broadly contemporaneous set of innovations in Old World farming

Andrew Sherratt's model of a secondary products revolution involved a widespread and broadly contemporaneous set of innovations in Old World farming. The use of domestic animals for primary carcass products (meat) was broadened from the 4th–3rd millennia BCE (c. Middle Chalcolithic) to include exploitation for renewable 'secondary' products: milk, wool, traction (the use of animals to drag ploughs in agriculture), riding and pack transport.

The SPR model incorporates two key elements:

1. the discovery and diffusion of secondary products innovations
2. their systematic application, leading to a transformation of Eurasian economy and society

Many of these innovations first appeared in the Near East during the fourth millennium BCE and spread to Europe and the rest of Asia soon afterwards. They appeared in Europe by the beginning of the third millennium BCE. These innovations became available in Europe due to the westwards diffusion of new species (horse, donkey), breeds (e.g. woolly sheep), technology (wheel, ard) and technological knowledge (e.g. ploughing). Their adoption can be understood in terms of pastoralism, plough agriculture and animal-based transport facilitating marginal agricultural colonisation and settlement nucleation. Ultimately it was revolutionary in terms of both origins and consequences.

However, both the dating and significance of the archaeological evidence cited by Sherratt (and thus the validity of the model) have been questioned by several archaeologists. The dangers of dating the innovations on the basis of evidence such as iconography and waterlogged organic remains with restricted chronological and geographical availability have been pointed out. Sherratt has himself acknowledged that such dates provide a terminus ante quem for the invention of milking and ploughing.

Direct evidence for how domestic animals were exploited in later prehistoric Europe has grown substantially, in quantity and diversity, since 1981. Initially the concepts of the SPR were tested by analysing the appearance of certain artefact types (e.g. ploughs, wheeled vehicles). By the middle 1980s the most common means of testing the model derived from the more ubiquitous faunal (zooarchaeological) assemblages, through which mortality patterns, herd management and traction-related arthropathies were utilized to confirm or reject the SPR model. Many zooarchaeological studies in both the Near East and Europe have confirmed the veracity of the model.

However the detection of milk residues in ceramic vessels is now considered the most promising means of detecting the origins of milking. Discovery of such residues has pushed back the earliest date for milking into the Neolithic. A study of more than 2,200 pottery vessels from sites in the Near East and Southeastern Europe indicated that milking had its origins in northwestern Anatolia. Milk residues had already been found in vessels from the British Neolithic, but farming arrived in Britain late (c. 4000 BCE).

The seeming contradiction between the zooarchaeological and residue studies appears to be a matter of scale. The residues indicate that milking may have played a role in domestic animal exploitation from the later Neolithic. The zooarchaeological studies indicate that there was a massive change in the scale of such production strategies during the Chalcolithic and Bronze Age.
