= Ruth Fincher =

Australian geographer

- Born: 27 March 1951 (age 75); Boort, Victoria, Australia
- Awards: Member of the Order of Australia; Fellow of the Australian Academy of Social Sciences
- Scientific career
- Fields: Urban Geography; Feminist geography
- Workplaces: McMaster University, University of Melbourne
- Doctoral advisor: Gerry Karaska?

Ruth B. Fincher AM FASSA (born 1951 in Victoria, Australia) is a leader in the field of feminist geography and urban geography. She is an Emeritus Foundation Professor of Geography at the University of Melbourne, Australia.

== Background ==
Fincher was born on 27 March 1951 in Boort, Western Victoria, Australia, to school teacher parents who moved between Terang, Coleraine, Moonee Ponds and Mildura. She completed schooling at University High School in Melbourne. She received her undergraduate degree at the University of Melbourne (completing Honours in 1972), her master's degree in geography at McMaster University in Ontario, Canada, and her PhD at the Graduate School of Geography at Clark University, Massachusetts, United States, in 1979 ("The local state and the urban built environment: the case of Boston in late capitalism"). She taught geography at McGill University and McMaster University before joining the University of Melbourne in 1985. In the early 1990s she took a secondment as Manager of Research at the federal government's Bureau of Immigration Research. At the University of Melbourne she was Director of the Australia Centre, Dean of the Faculty of Architecture, Building and Planning (2003-2006) and Professor of Urban Planning (1997-2006), before becoming Foundation Chair of Geography in 2006. From 2012 to 2014 she served as President of the Academic Board of the university.

== Contributions ==
Fincher specialises in the analysis of ethnicity and gender in the urban built environment, and the interaction between state institutions and the public. She has research and teaching interests in the impact of immigration, multiculturalism, and diversity in urban areas. She also worked on a joint project on public attitudes to sea level rise in Gippsland, Victoria.

== Awards ==
- Member (AM) in the General Division of the Order of Australia in 2014 for "significant service to education, particularly geography and urban studies, and international geographic associations".
- Distinguished Fellow of the Institute of Australian Geographers, 2009.
- Elected Fellow of the Australian Academy of Social Sciences in Australia, 2002.

== Selected publications ==
- Fincher, R.B., K. Iveson, H. Leitner and V. Preston. 2019. Everyday Equalities: Making Multicultures in Settler Colonial Cities. Minnesota University Press.
- Gibson, K., D. Bird Rose, and R.B. Fincher (eds.). 2015. Manifesto for Living in the Anthropocene. Brooklyn, NY: Punctum Books.
- Fincher R.B., J. Barnett, S. Graham, A. Hurlimann 2014. Time stories: Making sense of futures in anticipation of sea-level rise. Geoforum. 56:201–210.
- Fincher, R.B., & Iveson, K. 2008. Planning and Diversity in the City: Redistribution, Recognition and Encounter. London: Palgrave Macmillan. ISBN 978-1403938107
- Fincher R.B. and Saunders P. (ed.). 2001. Creating Unequal Futures Rethinking Inequality, Poverty and Disadvantage. Sydney: Allen and Unwin.
- Fincher, R.B. 2004. Gender and life course in the narratives of Melbourne's high‐rise housing developers. Australian Geographical Studies, 42(3): 325–338.
- Fincher, R.B., & Panelli, R. 2001. Making space: women's urban and rural activism and the Australian state. Gender, Place and Culture: A Journal of Feminist Geography 8(2): 129–148.
- Fincher, R.B., & Jacobs, J. M. (Eds.). 1998. Cities of difference. Guildford Press.
- Fincher, R.B. and J. Nieuwenhuysen. 1998. Australian Poverty: Then and Now Melbourne: Melbourne University Press.
