= Rindos affair =

Academic scandal and related defamation case at the University of Western Australia

The Rindos affair was an academic scandal that occurred at the University of Western Australia (UWA) in the early 1990s. The controversy involved allegations of misconduct within the Department of Archaeology, the denial of tenure to American archaeologist David Rindos, and a related defamation case arising from online comments about the dispute.

== Background ==
In early 1989, David Rindos, an archaeologist by qualification, was hired to fill a vacancy in UWA's Department of Archaeology and commenced work on 13 June 1989. In 1990, the head of department, Dr Sandra Bowdler, took study leave. Bowdler was the Foundation Professor of Archaeology, and Rindos served as acting head of department during her absence.

Rindos later reported that while acting head he became aware of problems in the department, including favouritism and relationships between staff and students. In December 1990, he sent a memorandum to Professor Charles Oxnard, then-head of Agriculture and Science, detailing allegations of academic misconduct against Bowdler.

== Tenure dispute ==
In June 1992, Rindos' three-year probationary period was complete and a decision on tenure was due. In May, Vice-Chancellor Fay Gale extended the review period by six months after receiving a memo from Dr Michael Partis, the new head of department. A Tenure Review Committee was formed and, after an hour of deliberation, unanimously decided to deny tenure.

The Department of Archaeology was dissolved in July 1992, and on 10 June 1993, Rindos was dismissed, effective 13 June. In early 1996, the university's Senate announced an inquiry into the denial of tenure to Rindos. The terms of reference did not extend to investigating the allegations of misconduct against Bowdler.

The Western Australian Legislative Council also investigated the denial of tenure, delivering its report in December 1997.

David Rindos died in 1996.

== Rindos v Hardwick ==
A related legal case, Rindos v Hardwick, concerned defamation arising from comments posted to the Usenet newsgroup sci.anthropology during the height of the tenure controversy. Gil Hardwick, who had no direct professional conflict with Rindos, posted an email that was argued to imply allegations of paedophilia against him.

Rindos brought defamation proceedings, which Hardwick did not contest due to lack of resources. Justice David Ipp of the Supreme Court of Western Australia awarded Rindos $40,000 in damages, noting that the Usenet posting was accessible to approximately 23,000 people worldwide, mostly academics and students. The case was one of the earliest Australian precedents involving Internet defamation and highlighted potential liability for users of online bulletin boards and similar services.
