= Andrew Sherratt =

English archaeologist, best known for his theory of the secondary products revolution

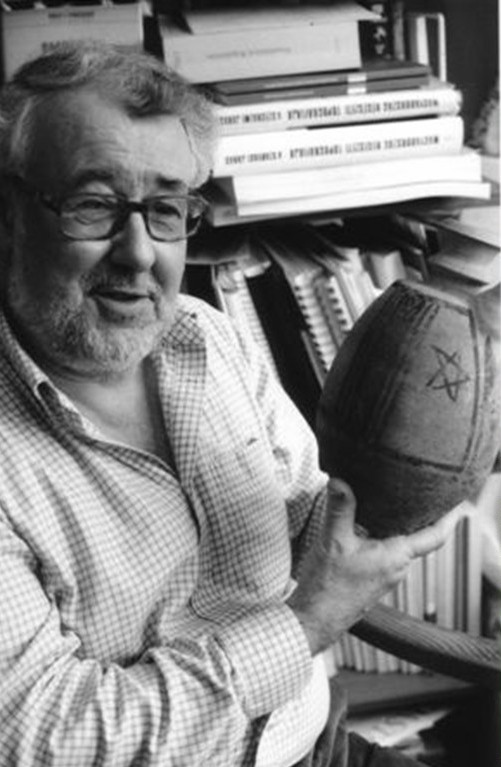
- Andrew Sherratt
- Born: 8 May 1946; Oldham, Lancashire
- Died: 24 February 2006 (aged 59); Oxford
- Education: University of Cambridge
- Spouse: Susan Sherratt
- Scientific career
- Fields: Archaeology
- Workplaces: Ashmolean Museum; University of Oxford; University of Sheffield
- Doctoral advisor: John Evans

Andrew George Sherratt (8 May 1946 – 24 February 2006) was an English archaeologist, one of the most influential of his generation. He was best known for his theory of the secondary products revolution.

== Early life and education ==
Sherratt was born in Oldham, Lancashire on 8 May 1946. From 1965, he studied archaeology and anthropology at Peterhouse, Cambridge, completing his degree in 1968. He received his PhD from Cambridge in 1976, writing his thesis on The Beginning of the Bronze Age in south-east Europe.

== Academic career ==
He moved to Oxford, having been appointed Assistant Keeper of Antiquities at the Ashmolean Museum in 1973. He was a reader at the University of Oxford from 1997 and Professor from 2002. Oxford remained his academic home until 2005, when he took up a professorship at the University of Sheffield. Sherratt travelled widely and received international recognition for his work. He was invited to give the prestigious Human Context and Society lectures at Boston University in 1998 and his topic was Between Evolution and History: long-term change in human societies.

=== Research ===
Sherratt's most cited publication was Plough and pastoralism: aspects of the secondary products revolution', published in 1981 in 'Pattern of the Past: Studies in Honour of David Clarke' , the first article in which he described his idea of a secondary products revolution.

He regularly contributed outside of his main field, for instance through a position on the editorial board of the historical journal Past and Present. His ability to work at a continental, even global, scale of analysis has invited comparisons with V. Gordon Childe.

Analysis at the continental scale led him into adaptation of world-systems theory to questions of change on the large scale in archaeology, notably in the first volume of the Journal of European Archaeology ( 'What would a Bronze Age world system look like? Relations between temperate Europe and the Mediterranean in later prehistory' ) and in his 1995 David Clarke Memorial Lecture, also published in JEA: 'Reviving the grand narrative: Archaeology and long-term change' . Such interests in linking across continents meant that Andrew maintained an interest in all the major shifts in humanity from global colonisation, through the spread of agriculture to the development of metallurgy and urbanism, including the Indo-European question and the development of new forms of consumption. A collection of his most significant publications in many of these areas appeared in 1997 as Economy and Society in Prehistoric Europe: changing perspectives.

Sherratt's interest in broad scale patterns in history attracted perhaps his most prestigious accolades, such as when the University of Chicago's historian William McNeill conferred a portion of the prestigious Erasmus Prize he won in 1996 upon Sherratt. The Erasmus Prize, awarded annually by the Dutch Praemium Erasmianum Foundation 'for exceptionally important contributions to European culture', requires the winner to pass on his prize-money to chosen nominees.

Sherratt recognised the importance of psychoactive drugs and medicine to early culture, and he was co-editor of Consuming Habits, Drugs in History and Anthropology. Sherratt was invited to present the four part television series, Sacred Weeds, which aired to critical acclaim in 1998.

Sherratt was always a stimulating and inspirational teacher. He had a significant hand in designing Oxford's undergraduate course in archaeology and anthropology, playing a key role as an interlocutor in the development of a new generation of archaeologists who drew from social anthropology as well as archaeology. However, presenting his ideas at the appropriate scale has been a constant challenge, as is reflected in an early edited work, the Cambridge Encyclopedia of Archaeology, published in 1980 and subsequently translated into German, French, Italian, Dutch and Swedish.

Shortly before his death of a heart attack in Witney (near Oxford), Andrew had initiated a project, ArchAtlas, that uses modern remote sensing technology, combined with image and text, to graphically communicate complex patterns of change and interaction across time and space.

== Personal life ==
Sherratt married Susan Sherratt in 1974; they had three children and also co-authored several academic articles.

Sherratt passed away suddenly from heart failure in 2006 at the age of 59.

=== Bibliography ===
- Bauer, Alexander A. (2011). "Life is Too Short for Faint-Heartedness: The Archaeology of Andrew Sheratt". Journal of World Prehistory. 24 (2–3): 99–105. doi:10.1007/s10963-011-9049-3.
- Marciniak, Arkadiusz (2011). "The Secondary Products Revolution: Empirical Evidence and its Current Zooarchaeological Critique". Journal of World Prehistory. 24 (2–3): 117–130. doi:10.1007/s10963-011-9045-7.
- Obituary in The Independent 6 March 2006
- Obituary on the University of Sheffield web site
- Obituary in The New York Times.

== Video ==
- Sacred Weeds: Salvia Divinorum
- Sacred Weeds: Henbane
- Sacred Weeds: Blue Lily
- Sacred Weeds: Amanita Muscaria
