= David Rindos =

David Rindos (1947 – 9 December 1996) was an American archaeologist. He graduated with a PhD from Cornell University and subsequently held a number of short-term positions in the US. His book on the origins of agriculture, published in 1984, was hailed as a major innovative contribution to the field. In 1989, he was recruited to the University of Western Australia, where he worked until his dismissal and involvement in the Rindos affair.

He died of a massive heart attack in 1996, aged 49.

== Life ==
Rindos was born in Brooklyn and graduated in sociology from Cornell University in 1969. Following this, he worked in organizations including Volunteers in Service to America and New York Public Interest Research Group. In 1976, he worked in the area of palaeobiology in Cyprus, and in 1977 worked in the Sula Valley Archaeological Project in Honduras, after which he returned to Cornell and earned a master's degree in Botany in 1980 and PhD in Anthropology and Evolutionary Biology in 1981.

Rindos taught at Cornell University and in the state universities of Illinois, Missouri and Michigan, the Australian National University and at the University of Western Australia, where he was involved in a controversy over management of the archaeology department and subsequently denied tenure (the Rindos affair).

While at Cornell, Rindos had a relationship with Susan Straight, daughter of editor and publisher Michael Straight. The relationship produced two children, Willow Rindos and Noah Rindos. Michael Straight is identified in his obituary in the Vineyard Gazette, as the grandfather of Willow and Noah.

Rindos' best known work is "The Origins of Agriculture" (1984), in which he explained the emergence of agriculture as selective coevolution of plants and groups of people who have benefited mutually. Rindos also had articles on the history of agriculture published in the journal Current Anthropology, in the Encyclopædia Britannica and in the "Illustrated History of Humankind".

== See also ==
- Rindos v Hardwick
- History of agriculture
