= Tokarczuk (surname) =

Tokarczuk , Tokarczyk or Tokarchuk (Ukrainian: Токарчук) is a gender-neutral Slavic surname that may refer to:

- Byron Tokarchuk (born 1965), Canadian basketball player
- Ignacy Tokarczuk (1918–2012), Polish bishop
- Michelle Tokarczyk (born 1953), American author
- Olga Tokarczuk (born 1962), Polish writer

== See also ==
- 555468 Tokarczuk, minor planet
