= Michelle Tokarczyk =

American poet

- Born: Michelle Marianne Tokarczyk; 1953 (age 72–73); The Bronx, New York City

Academic background
- Education: Lehman College (B.A.); Stony Brook University (Ph.D.)
- Thesis: The Rosenberg Case and E. L. Doctorow's The Book of Daniel: A Study of the Use of History in Fiction (1986)

Academic work
- Institutions: Goucher College
- Main interests: Literary criticism and history; Women's studies and issues

Michelle Marianne Tokarczyk (born 1953) is an American author, poet, and literary critic. She is a long-time professor of English and former co-director of the Writing Program at Goucher College. Her works focus on people living in urban environments, literary history, and women's studies and issues.

== Early life and education ==
Michelle Marianne Tokarczyk was born in 1953 in the Bronx to a working-class Ukrainian American family. At the age of nine, she moved to a suburban area of Queens. She earned her bachelor's degree at Lehman College. Tokarczyk completed her doctorate in English from Stony Brook University in 1986. Her dissertation was entitled The Rosenberg Case and E. L. Doctorow's The Book of Daniel: A Study of the Use of History in Fiction.

== Career ==
Tokarczyk began working as professor of English at Goucher College in 1989. In 2003, she was a co-director of the Goucher Writing Program. Her poetry focuses on urban people, especially women. She also researches literary criticism, history, and women's studies and issues. Tokarczyk is the author of several books.

In 2010, Tokarczyk was the Goucher chapter president of the American Association of University Professors. She was the vice president of the Maryland Conference of the American Association of University Professors in 2014. As of April 2018, Tokarczyk is the president of the Maryland Conference.

== Personal life ==
Tokarczyk lives in Baltimore and New York City. She is married to economist Paul Groncki.

== Selected works ==
=== Books ===
- Tokarczyk, Michelle M.; Doctorow, E. L. (1988). E.L. Doctorow: An Annotated Bibliography. Taylor & Francis. ISBN 0824072464.
- Tokarczyk, Michelle M. (1989). House I'm Running From. West End Press. ISBN 0931122538.
- Tokarczyk, Michelle M.; Fay, Elizabeth A. (1993). Working-class Women in the Academy: Laborers in the Knowledge Factory. University of Massachusetts Press. ISBN 0870238353.
- Tokarczyk, Michelle M. (2000). E.L. Doctorow's Skeptical Commitment. P. Lang. ISBN 0820444707.
- Tokarczyk, Michelle M.; Papoulis, Irene (2003). Teaching Composition/Teaching Literature: Crossing Great Divides. P. Lang. ISBN 0820451509.
- Tokarczyk, Michelle M. (2008). Class Definitions: On the Lives and Writings of Maxine Hong Kingston, Sandra Cisneros, and Dorothy Allison. Susquehanna University Press. ISBN 978-1575911212.
- Tokarczyk, Michelle M. (2011). Critical Approaches to American Working-Class Literature. Routledge. ISBN 978-1136697418.
- Tokarczyk, Michelle M. (2016). Bronx Migrations. Columbia, MD: Cherry Castle Publishing. ISBN 978-0692737651.
