= List of minor planets: 555001–556000 =

The following is a partial list of minor planets, running from minor-planet number 555001 through 556000, inclusive. The primary data for this and other partial lists is based on JPL's "Small-Body Orbital Elements" and data available from the Minor Planet Center. Critical list information is also provided by the MPC, unless otherwise specified from Lowell Observatory. A detailed description of the table's columns and additional sources are given on the main page including a complete list of every page in this series, and a statistical break-up on the dynamical classification of minor planets.

Also see the summary list of all named bodies in numerical and alphabetical order, and the corresponding naming citations for the number range of this particular list. New namings may only be added to this list after official publication, as the preannouncement of names is condemned by the Working Group for Small Bodies Nomenclature of the International Astronomical Union.

Near-Earth obj.	MBA (inner)	MBA (outer)	Centaur
Mars-crosser	MBA (middle)	Jupiter trojan	Trans-Neptunian obj.
Unclassified

== 555001–555100 ==
Designation			Discovery			Properties		Ref
Permanent	Provisional	Named after	Date	Site	Discoverer(s)	Category	Diam.	Ref
555001	2013 LW_{21}	—	May 7, 2013	Kitt Peak	Spacewatch	·	1.1 km	MPC · JPL
555002	2013 LY_{23}	—	May 16, 2013	Haleakala	Pan-STARRS 1	·	1.1 km	MPC · JPL
555003	2013 LB_{29}	—	June 12, 2013	Haleakala	Pan-STARRS 1	H	430 m	MPC · JPL
555004	2013 LA_{31}	—	May 16, 2013	Nogales	M. Schwartz, P. R. Holvorcem	·	2.0 km	MPC · JPL
555005	2013 LB_{33}	—	July 18, 2001	Palomar	NEAT	·	1.2 km	MPC · JPL
555006	2013 LH_{35}	—	June 8, 2013	Siding Spring	SSS	·	1.6 km	MPC · JPL
555007	2013 LQ_{42}	—	June 7, 2013	Haleakala	Pan-STARRS 1	·	2.2 km	MPC · JPL
555008	2013 MJ_{6}	—	June 1, 2013	Catalina	CSS	·	1.2 km	MPC · JPL
555009	2013 ML_{12}	—	June 20, 2013	Haleakala	Pan-STARRS 1	TIR	1.9 km	MPC · JPL
555010	2013 MJ_{13}	—	June 20, 2013	Haleakala	Pan-STARRS 1	·	1.4 km	MPC · JPL
555011	2013 MG_{20}	—	June 18, 2013	Haleakala	Pan-STARRS 1	·	1.4 km	MPC · JPL
555012	2013 NL_{1}	—	February 9, 2008	Kitt Peak	Spacewatch	·	1.2 km	MPC · JPL
555013	2013 NP_{6}	—	February 5, 2007	Palomar	NEAT	H	590 m	MPC · JPL
555014	2013 NR_{6}	—	July 4, 2013	Haleakala	Pan-STARRS 1	H	550 m	MPC · JPL
555015	2013 NL_{8}	—	March 9, 2000	Socorro	LINEAR	·	1.4 km	MPC · JPL
555016	2013 NC_{11}	—	December 25, 2003	Kitt Peak	Spacewatch	·	4.5 km	MPC · JPL
555017	2013 NZ_{11}	—	June 8, 2004	Palomar	NEAT	·	2.5 km	MPC · JPL
555018	2013 NP_{19}	—	July 1, 2013	Haleakala	Pan-STARRS 1	T_{j} (2.99) · 3:2 · SHU	5.0 km	MPC · JPL
555019	2013 NX_{20}	—	March 4, 2006	Mount Lemmon	Mount Lemmon Survey	·	520 m	MPC · JPL
555020	2013 NA_{26}	—	April 18, 2007	Mount Lemmon	Mount Lemmon Survey	·	1.7 km	MPC · JPL
555021	2013 NE_{27}	—	September 28, 2009	Mount Lemmon	Mount Lemmon Survey	HOF	1.9 km	MPC · JPL
555022	2013 NU_{27}	—	July 15, 2013	Haleakala	Pan-STARRS 1	·	1.3 km	MPC · JPL
555023	2013 NH_{30}	—	July 14, 2013	Haleakala	Pan-STARRS 1	·	1.9 km	MPC · JPL
555024	2013 NY_{31}	—	July 15, 2013	Haleakala	Pan-STARRS 1	EOS	1.2 km	MPC · JPL
555025	2013 NZ_{40}	—	July 14, 2013	Haleakala	Pan-STARRS 1	GEF	930 m	MPC · JPL
555026	2013 NL_{42}	—	February 15, 2016	Mount Lemmon	Mount Lemmon Survey	·	1.3 km	MPC · JPL
555027	2013 NQ_{50}	—	July 15, 2013	Haleakala	Pan-STARRS 1	·	1.3 km	MPC · JPL
555028	2013 NF_{52}	—	July 13, 2013	Mount Lemmon	Mount Lemmon Survey	·	1.5 km	MPC · JPL
555029	2013 NL_{56}	—	July 13, 2013	Haleakala	Pan-STARRS 1	·	940 m	MPC · JPL
555030	2013 OP	—	August 31, 2009	Siding Spring	SSS	·	2.0 km	MPC · JPL
555031	2013 OU_{2}	—	July 1, 2013	Haleakala	Pan-STARRS 1	·	1.7 km	MPC · JPL
555032	2013 OZ_{5}	—	December 2, 2005	Catalina	CSS	HNS	1.9 km	MPC · JPL
555033	2013 OL_{11}	—	June 3, 2013	Mount Lemmon	Mount Lemmon Survey	·	1.3 km	MPC · JPL
555034	2013 OT_{11}	—	August 26, 2012	Kitt Peak	Spacewatch	L5	8.2 km	MPC · JPL
555035	2013 OK_{13}	—	April 10, 2016	Haleakala	Pan-STARRS 1	·	1.4 km	MPC · JPL
555036	2013 OG_{14}	—	July 18, 2013	Haleakala	Pan-STARRS 1	·	1.6 km	MPC · JPL
555037	2013 ON_{14}	—	July 16, 2013	Haleakala	Pan-STARRS 1	INA	1.9 km	MPC · JPL
555038	2013 OZ_{16}	—	July 16, 2013	Haleakala	Pan-STARRS 1	·	2.7 km	MPC · JPL
555039	2013 OC_{17}	—	July 16, 2013	Haleakala	Pan-STARRS 1	·	1.9 km	MPC · JPL
555040	2013 PD	—	September 22, 2009	Mount Lemmon	Mount Lemmon Survey	·	1.5 km	MPC · JPL
555041	2013 PE_{6}	—	July 13, 2013	Haleakala	Pan-STARRS 1	·	2.3 km	MPC · JPL
555042	2013 PZ_{14}	—	June 19, 2013	Mount Lemmon	Mount Lemmon Survey	·	1.7 km	MPC · JPL
555043	2013 PV_{19}	—	July 2, 2008	Kitt Peak	Spacewatch	·	1.9 km	MPC · JPL
555044	2013 PU_{23}	—	August 8, 2013	Haleakala	Pan-STARRS 1	·	1.7 km	MPC · JPL
555045	2013 PY_{23}	—	March 20, 2007	Kitt Peak	Spacewatch	·	1.4 km	MPC · JPL
555046	2013 PA_{24}	—	November 24, 2009	Kitt Peak	Spacewatch	AGN	910 m	MPC · JPL
555047	2013 PE_{29}	—	March 11, 2003	Palomar	NEAT	·	1.9 km	MPC · JPL
555048	2013 PV_{30}	—	August 9, 2013	Haleakala	Pan-STARRS 1	·	1.8 km	MPC · JPL
555049	2013 PV_{59}	—	September 18, 2009	Kitt Peak	Spacewatch	·	1.3 km	MPC · JPL
555050	2013 PK_{61}	—	June 20, 2013	Haleakala	Pan-STARRS 1	EUN	1.1 km	MPC · JPL
555051	2013 PR_{61}	—	August 15, 2013	Haleakala	Pan-STARRS 1	EOS	1.5 km	MPC · JPL
555052	2013 PC_{63}	—	April 15, 2012	Haleakala	Pan-STARRS 1	·	1.5 km	MPC · JPL
555053	2013 PF_{65}	—	July 15, 2013	Haleakala	Pan-STARRS 1	HNS	940 m	MPC · JPL
555054	2013 PX_{75}	—	January 2, 2006	Mount Lemmon	Mount Lemmon Survey	AGN	960 m	MPC · JPL
555055	2013 PO_{76}	—	March 26, 2006	Kitt Peak	Spacewatch	·	2.8 km	MPC · JPL
555056	2013 PR_{76}	—	March 2, 2011	Mount Lemmon	Mount Lemmon Survey	·	1.6 km	MPC · JPL
555057	2013 PG_{78}	—	August 10, 2013	Kitt Peak	Spacewatch	·	1.7 km	MPC · JPL
555058	2013 PV_{78}	—	August 21, 2004	Siding Spring	SSS	·	1.5 km	MPC · JPL
555059	2013 PF_{79}	—	March 2, 2011	Mount Lemmon	Mount Lemmon Survey	KOR	1.3 km	MPC · JPL
555060	2013 PR_{79}	—	August 8, 2013	Kitt Peak	Spacewatch	·	1.6 km	MPC · JPL
555061	2013 PW_{79}	—	February 21, 2006	Mount Lemmon	Mount Lemmon Survey	KOR	1.0 km	MPC · JPL
555062	2013 PA_{81}	—	February 25, 2011	Mount Lemmon	Mount Lemmon Survey	·	1.4 km	MPC · JPL
555063	2013 PS_{82}	—	August 15, 2013	Haleakala	Pan-STARRS 1	KOR	990 m	MPC · JPL
555064	2013 PL_{86}	—	August 8, 2013	Kitt Peak	Spacewatch	AGN	870 m	MPC · JPL
555065	2013 PH_{92}	—	November 26, 2014	Haleakala	Pan-STARRS 1	·	1.5 km	MPC · JPL
555066	2013 PY_{92}	—	August 13, 2013	Palomar	Palomar Transient Factory	·	2.0 km	MPC · JPL
555067	2013 PZ_{93}	—	August 12, 2013	Haleakala	Pan-STARRS 1	·	1.3 km	MPC · JPL
555068	2013 PM_{98}	—	August 15, 2013	Haleakala	Pan-STARRS 1	KOR	960 m	MPC · JPL
555069	2013 PT_{98}	—	August 15, 2013	Haleakala	Pan-STARRS 1	HOF	2.0 km	MPC · JPL
555070	2013 PW_{98}	—	October 25, 2005	Kitt Peak	Spacewatch	·	1.3 km	MPC · JPL
555071	2013 PU_{100}	—	August 14, 2013	Haleakala	Pan-STARRS 1	·	1.4 km	MPC · JPL
555072	2013 PE_{101}	—	August 12, 2013	Haleakala	Pan-STARRS 1	·	1.2 km	MPC · JPL
555073	2013 PG_{105}	—	August 10, 2013	Kitt Peak	Spacewatch	·	1.5 km	MPC · JPL
555074	2013 PL_{105}	—	August 14, 2013	Haleakala	Pan-STARRS 1	WIT	910 m	MPC · JPL
555075	2013 PS_{105}	—	August 8, 2013	Haleakala	Pan-STARRS 1	·	1.5 km	MPC · JPL
555076	2013 QE_{5}	—	January 18, 2005	Kitt Peak	Spacewatch	·	3.0 km	MPC · JPL
555077	2013 QW_{10}	—	August 8, 2013	Palomar	Palomar Transient Factory	·	1.4 km	MPC · JPL
555078	2013 QZ_{13}	—	August 27, 2013	Haleakala	Pan-STARRS 1	·	1.6 km	MPC · JPL
555079	2013 QM_{17}	—	July 5, 2000	Anderson Mesa	LONEOS	JUN	1.1 km	MPC · JPL
555080	2013 QA_{18}	—	February 25, 2011	Mount Lemmon	Mount Lemmon Survey	·	1.4 km	MPC · JPL
555081	2013 QS_{20}	—	February 8, 2011	Mount Lemmon	Mount Lemmon Survey	HOF	2.4 km	MPC · JPL
555082	2013 QA_{26}	—	August 12, 2004	Cerro Tololo	Deep Ecliptic Survey	·	1.3 km	MPC · JPL
555083	2013 QQ_{26}	—	August 24, 2008	Kitt Peak	Spacewatch	·	1.9 km	MPC · JPL
555084	2013 QV_{30}	—	April 27, 2012	Haleakala	Pan-STARRS 1	·	1.5 km	MPC · JPL
555085	2013 QP_{33}	—	August 30, 2013	Haleakala	Pan-STARRS 1	·	1.4 km	MPC · JPL
555086	2013 QT_{34}	—	October 25, 2005	Mount Lemmon	Mount Lemmon Survey	·	1.5 km	MPC · JPL
555087	2013 QM_{40}	—	August 15, 2013	Haleakala	Pan-STARRS 1	·	1.3 km	MPC · JPL
555088	2013 QN_{41}	—	January 19, 2012	Haleakala	Pan-STARRS 1	·	1.7 km	MPC · JPL
555089	2013 QU_{41}	—	May 27, 2008	Mount Lemmon	Mount Lemmon Survey	·	1.2 km	MPC · JPL
555090	2013 QW_{42}	—	July 22, 2002	Palomar	NEAT	·	3.9 km	MPC · JPL
555091	2013 QQ_{43}	—	February 25, 2011	Mount Lemmon	Mount Lemmon Survey	HOF	1.7 km	MPC · JPL
555092 Annasusanne	2013 QY_{47}	Annasusanne	August 30, 2013	SATINO Remote	J. Jahn	·	1.6 km	MPC · JPL
555093	2013 QZ_{49}	—	August 31, 2013	Haleakala	Pan-STARRS 1	·	1.3 km	MPC · JPL
555094	2013 QW_{50}	—	October 11, 2007	Mount Lemmon	Mount Lemmon Survey	·	690 m	MPC · JPL
555095	2013 QE_{56}	—	August 26, 2013	Haleakala	Pan-STARRS 1	·	1.7 km	MPC · JPL
555096	2013 QD_{58}	—	August 26, 2013	Haleakala	Pan-STARRS 1	·	1.5 km	MPC · JPL
555097	2013 QD_{59}	—	November 11, 2009	Mount Lemmon	Mount Lemmon Survey	·	1.4 km	MPC · JPL
555098	2013 QW_{59}	—	September 27, 2009	Mount Lemmon	Mount Lemmon Survey	·	1.6 km	MPC · JPL
555099	2013 QL_{61}	—	October 18, 2003	Palomar	NEAT	·	1.4 km	MPC · JPL
555100	2013 QR_{64}	—	August 26, 2005	Palomar	NEAT	·	1.7 km	MPC · JPL

== 555101–555200 ==
back to top

Designation			Discovery			Properties		Ref
Permanent	Provisional	Named after	Date	Site	Discoverer(s)	Category	Diam.	Ref
555101	2013 QA_{70}	—	October 7, 2008	Kitt Peak	Spacewatch	H	570 m	MPC · JPL
555102	2013 QZ_{71}	—	August 26, 2013	Haleakala	Pan-STARRS 1	·	1.7 km	MPC · JPL
555103	2013 QH_{77}	—	January 14, 2011	Kitt Peak	Spacewatch	HOF	2.2 km	MPC · JPL
555104	2013 QY_{77}	—	February 5, 2011	Mount Lemmon	Mount Lemmon Survey	·	1.7 km	MPC · JPL
555105	2013 QV_{85}	—	February 13, 2011	Mount Lemmon	Mount Lemmon Survey	·	1.6 km	MPC · JPL
555106	2013 QU_{87}	—	January 14, 2011	Kitt Peak	Spacewatch	·	1.5 km	MPC · JPL
555107	2013 QD_{88}	—	August 9, 2013	Kitt Peak	Spacewatch	·	1.6 km	MPC · JPL
555108	2013 QM_{89}	—	July 14, 2013	Haleakala	Pan-STARRS 1	·	1.1 km	MPC · JPL
555109	2013 QL_{90}	—	February 10, 2011	Mount Lemmon	Mount Lemmon Survey	·	1.6 km	MPC · JPL
555110	2013 QA_{92}	—	March 14, 2007	Mount Lemmon	Mount Lemmon Survey	·	1.9 km	MPC · JPL
555111	2013 QD_{95}	—	October 11, 2004	Kitt Peak	Deep Ecliptic Survey	·	1.6 km	MPC · JPL
555112 Monika	2013 QS_{96}	Monika	August 30, 2013	Tincana	M. Kusiak, M. Żołnowski	·	1.2 km	MPC · JPL
555113	2013 QT_{100}	—	August 27, 2013	Haleakala	Pan-STARRS 1	AGN	950 m	MPC · JPL
555114	2013 RP_{3}	—	November 7, 2005	Mauna Kea	A. Boattini	AGN	1.0 km	MPC · JPL
555115	2013 RH_{6}	—	August 14, 2013	Haleakala	Pan-STARRS 1	·	2.0 km	MPC · JPL
555116	2013 RL_{12}	—	February 5, 2011	Haleakala	Pan-STARRS 1	·	1.7 km	MPC · JPL
555117	2013 RL_{13}	—	April 27, 2012	Haleakala	Pan-STARRS 1	·	1.5 km	MPC · JPL
555118	2013 RT_{19}	—	February 21, 2012	Mount Lemmon	Mount Lemmon Survey	BAR	1.1 km	MPC · JPL
555119	2013 RU_{23}	—	October 23, 2009	Mount Lemmon	Mount Lemmon Survey	MIS	2.5 km	MPC · JPL
555120 Ottoguthier	2013 RW_{24}	Ottoguthier	September 1, 2013	SATINO Remote	J. Jahn	·	1.5 km	MPC · JPL
555121	2013 RA_{25}	—	March 14, 2011	Mount Lemmon	Mount Lemmon Survey	AGN	940 m	MPC · JPL
555122	2013 RF_{36}	—	September 5, 2013	Mount Lemmon	Mount Lemmon Survey	APO +1km	1.4 km	MPC · JPL
555123	2013 RO_{41}	—	September 22, 2008	Kitt Peak	Spacewatch	·	1.6 km	MPC · JPL
555124	2013 RS_{41}	—	August 17, 2013	Haleakala	Pan-STARRS 1	·	1.7 km	MPC · JPL
555125	2013 RV_{45}	—	September 10, 2013	Haleakala	Pan-STARRS 1	·	1.8 km	MPC · JPL
555126	2013 RG_{50}	—	September 23, 2004	Vail-Jarnac	Jarnac	GEF	1.1 km	MPC · JPL
555127	2013 RY_{51}	—	September 11, 2013	Palomar	Palomar Transient Factory	·	1.8 km	MPC · JPL
555128 Birštonas	2013 RZ_{51}	Birštonas	September 12, 2013	Baldone	K. Černis, I. Eglītis	·	1.9 km	MPC · JPL
555129	2013 RF_{55}	—	September 20, 2003	Kitt Peak	Spacewatch	·	1.8 km	MPC · JPL
555130	2013 RA_{56}	—	September 10, 2013	Haleakala	Pan-STARRS 1	·	1.7 km	MPC · JPL
555131	2013 RQ_{56}	—	September 7, 2004	Palomar	NEAT	·	2.8 km	MPC · JPL
555132	2013 RR_{56}	—	March 16, 2012	Haleakala	Pan-STARRS 1	·	1.2 km	MPC · JPL
555133	2013 RL_{63}	—	March 1, 2011	Mount Lemmon	Mount Lemmon Survey	·	1.6 km	MPC · JPL
555134	2013 RR_{63}	—	September 6, 2008	Mount Lemmon	Mount Lemmon Survey	KOR	1.2 km	MPC · JPL
555135	2013 RZ_{63}	—	August 14, 2013	Haleakala	Pan-STARRS 1	·	1.7 km	MPC · JPL
555136	2013 RE_{67}	—	September 12, 2004	Kitt Peak	Spacewatch	·	1.6 km	MPC · JPL
555137	2013 RO_{67}	—	November 19, 2009	Mount Lemmon	Mount Lemmon Survey	·	1.4 km	MPC · JPL
555138	2013 RW_{67}	—	October 7, 2005	Mauna Kea	A. Boattini	·	2.8 km	MPC · JPL
555139	2013 RY_{67}	—	February 26, 2012	Kitt Peak	Spacewatch	·	1.2 km	MPC · JPL
555140	2013 RK_{72}	—	September 14, 2013	Palomar	Palomar Transient Factory	·	2.6 km	MPC · JPL
555141	2013 RN_{72}	—	September 20, 2000	Haleakala	NEAT	·	2.2 km	MPC · JPL
555142	2013 RB_{75}	—	September 6, 2008	Mount Lemmon	Mount Lemmon Survey	KOR	1.3 km	MPC · JPL
555143	2013 RY_{75}	—	May 9, 2007	Mount Lemmon	Mount Lemmon Survey	·	1.6 km	MPC · JPL
555144	2013 RY_{76}	—	March 6, 2011	Mount Lemmon	Mount Lemmon Survey	·	2.2 km	MPC · JPL
555145	2013 RB_{85}	—	November 17, 2009	Kitt Peak	Spacewatch	·	1.9 km	MPC · JPL
555146	2013 RD_{87}	—	September 13, 2013	Kitt Peak	Spacewatch	·	2.3 km	MPC · JPL
555147	2013 RE_{89}	—	October 5, 2004	Kitt Peak	Spacewatch	·	1.8 km	MPC · JPL
555148	2013 RK_{92}	—	September 14, 2013	Kitt Peak	Spacewatch	·	1.4 km	MPC · JPL
555149	2013 RL_{93}	—	September 1, 2013	Mount Lemmon	Mount Lemmon Survey	·	2.5 km	MPC · JPL
555150	2013 RW_{93}	—	September 5, 2013	Kitt Peak	Spacewatch	·	1.7 km	MPC · JPL
555151	2013 RZ_{93}	—	March 28, 2008	Mount Lemmon	Mount Lemmon Survey	·	1.2 km	MPC · JPL
555152 Oproiu	2013 RV_{94}	Oproiu	November 14, 2009	La Palma	EURONEAR	·	1.5 km	MPC · JPL
555153	2013 RC_{101}	—	September 15, 2013	Mount Lemmon	Mount Lemmon Survey	KOR	1.1 km	MPC · JPL
555154	2013 RK_{101}	—	September 14, 2013	Haleakala	Pan-STARRS 1	NEM	1.7 km	MPC · JPL
555155	2013 RA_{102}	—	September 2, 2013	Mount Lemmon	Mount Lemmon Survey	·	1.9 km	MPC · JPL
555156	2013 RO_{103}	—	September 16, 2003	Kitt Peak	Spacewatch	·	1.6 km	MPC · JPL
555157	2013 RL_{104}	—	March 13, 2011	Mount Lemmon	Mount Lemmon Survey	(5651)	3.2 km	MPC · JPL
555158	2013 RP_{108}	—	September 6, 2013	Kitt Peak	Spacewatch	·	2.5 km	MPC · JPL
555159	2013 RZ_{109}	—	September 3, 2013	Mount Lemmon	Mount Lemmon Survey	L5	6.7 km	MPC · JPL
555160	2013 RA_{110}	—	September 4, 2013	Catalina	CSS	·	2.0 km	MPC · JPL
555161	2013 RS_{111}	—	September 6, 2013	Kitt Peak	Spacewatch	·	2.9 km	MPC · JPL
555162	2013 RP_{121}	—	January 17, 2015	Mount Lemmon	Mount Lemmon Survey	·	1.7 km	MPC · JPL
555163	2013 RS_{121}	—	September 1, 2013	Haleakala	Pan-STARRS 1	·	1.5 km	MPC · JPL
555164	2013 RS_{123}	—	September 9, 2013	Haleakala	Pan-STARRS 1	·	1.6 km	MPC · JPL
555165	2013 RV_{126}	—	March 30, 2016	Haleakala	Pan-STARRS 1	·	2.5 km	MPC · JPL
555166	2013 RU_{129}	—	September 2, 2013	Mount Lemmon	Mount Lemmon Survey	HOF	1.8 km	MPC · JPL
555167	2013 RF_{131}	—	September 1, 2013	Haleakala	Pan-STARRS 1	·	1.5 km	MPC · JPL
555168	2013 RZ_{136}	—	September 14, 2013	Haleakala	Pan-STARRS 1	L5	7.5 km	MPC · JPL
555169	2013 RE_{137}	—	June 1, 2008	Mount Lemmon	Mount Lemmon Survey	·	1.6 km	MPC · JPL
555170	2013 RO_{147}	—	September 14, 2013	Haleakala	Pan-STARRS 1	EOS	1.4 km	MPC · JPL
555171	2013 RR_{147}	—	September 14, 2013	Haleakala	Pan-STARRS 1	·	2.2 km	MPC · JPL
555172	2013 SD_{3}	—	August 31, 2017	Mount Lemmon	Mount Lemmon Survey	·	2.3 km	MPC · JPL
555173	2013 SJ_{5}	—	March 31, 2008	Kitt Peak	Spacewatch	L5	9.9 km	MPC · JPL
555174	2013 SG_{6}	—	September 17, 2013	Mount Lemmon	Mount Lemmon Survey	·	2.4 km	MPC · JPL
555175	2013 SG_{8}	—	September 17, 2013	Mount Lemmon	Mount Lemmon Survey	·	1.5 km	MPC · JPL
555176	2013 SG_{10}	—	August 14, 2013	Haleakala	Pan-STARRS 1	·	2.0 km	MPC · JPL
555177	2013 SH_{11}	—	November 17, 2009	Kitt Peak	Spacewatch	KOR	1.1 km	MPC · JPL
555178	2013 SD_{12}	—	September 7, 2002	Campo Imperatore	CINEOS	H	400 m	MPC · JPL
555179	2013 SA_{16}	—	September 23, 2013	Mount Lemmon	Mount Lemmon Survey	AST	1.4 km	MPC · JPL
555180	2013 SA_{22}	—	September 11, 2004	Kitt Peak	Spacewatch	·	1.4 km	MPC · JPL
555181	2013 SX_{22}	—	March 2, 2011	Mount Lemmon	Mount Lemmon Survey	·	1.6 km	MPC · JPL
555182	2013 SW_{25}	—	September 28, 2013	Oukaïmeden	C. Rinner	·	1.7 km	MPC · JPL
555183	2013 SQ_{28}	—	December 2, 2005	Kitt Peak	Wasserman, L. H., Millis, R. L.	·	2.2 km	MPC · JPL
555184	2013 SL_{35}	—	October 23, 2004	Kitt Peak	Spacewatch	AGN	1.1 km	MPC · JPL
555185	2013 SD_{37}	—	September 9, 2013	Haleakala	Pan-STARRS 1	·	1.7 km	MPC · JPL
555186	2013 SC_{38}	—	August 4, 2003	Kitt Peak	Spacewatch	·	2.1 km	MPC · JPL
555187	2013 SJ_{39}	—	January 26, 2006	Mount Lemmon	Mount Lemmon Survey	HOF	2.6 km	MPC · JPL
555188	2013 SN_{40}	—	September 26, 2013	Catalina	CSS	·	2.8 km	MPC · JPL
555189	2013 SV_{41}	—	November 20, 2009	Mount Lemmon	Mount Lemmon Survey	AGN	1.1 km	MPC · JPL
555190	2013 SX_{44}	—	September 1, 2013	Mount Lemmon	Mount Lemmon Survey	·	1.6 km	MPC · JPL
555191	2013 SL_{48}	—	September 28, 2013	Mount Lemmon	Mount Lemmon Survey	·	2.2 km	MPC · JPL
555192	2013 SS_{49}	—	October 15, 2004	Mount Lemmon	Mount Lemmon Survey	·	1.9 km	MPC · JPL
555193	2013 SL_{52}	—	February 7, 2002	Kitt Peak	Deep Ecliptic Survey	·	2.5 km	MPC · JPL
555194	2013 SZ_{58}	—	September 20, 2008	Mount Lemmon	Mount Lemmon Survey	KOR	1.1 km	MPC · JPL
555195	2013 SN_{69}	—	January 7, 2006	Kitt Peak	Spacewatch	·	1.7 km	MPC · JPL
555196	2013 SY_{74}	—	September 25, 2013	Mount Lemmon	Mount Lemmon Survey	KOR	1.1 km	MPC · JPL
555197	2013 SD_{82}	—	October 24, 2005	Mauna Kea	A. Boattini	AGN	1.4 km	MPC · JPL
555198	2013 SX_{84}	—	September 29, 2001	Palomar	NEAT	·	1.2 km	MPC · JPL
555199	2013 SN_{90}	—	March 23, 2012	Kitt Peak	Spacewatch	·	2.1 km	MPC · JPL
555200	2013 SW_{93}	—	September 9, 2013	Haleakala	Pan-STARRS 1	AGN	1.3 km	MPC · JPL

== 555201–555300 ==
back to top

Designation			Discovery			Properties		Ref
Permanent	Provisional	Named after	Date	Site	Discoverer(s)	Category	Diam.	Ref
555201	2013 SY_{98}	—	September 6, 2013	Kitt Peak	Spacewatch	JUN	1.0 km	MPC · JPL
555202	2013 SH_{107}	—	September 29, 2013	Mount Lemmon	Mount Lemmon Survey	·	1.4 km	MPC · JPL
555203	2013 TL_{9}	—	July 20, 2013	Haleakala	Pan-STARRS 1	EUP	2.7 km	MPC · JPL
555204	2013 TE_{10}	—	October 3, 2002	Palomar	NEAT	·	2.8 km	MPC · JPL
555205	2013 TQ_{11}	—	February 8, 2011	Mount Lemmon	Mount Lemmon Survey	GEF	1.1 km	MPC · JPL
555206	2013 TK_{13}	—	March 19, 2004	Socorro	LINEAR	·	2.1 km	MPC · JPL
555207	2013 TF_{14}	—	May 14, 2012	Haleakala	Pan-STARRS 1	·	1.7 km	MPC · JPL
555208	2013 TL_{15}	—	September 25, 2013	Mount Lemmon	Mount Lemmon Survey	KOR	1.4 km	MPC · JPL
555209	2013 TO_{17}	—	October 1, 2013	Kitt Peak	Spacewatch	·	2.9 km	MPC · JPL
555210	2013 TM_{21}	—	October 23, 2003	Apache Point	SDSS	·	2.4 km	MPC · JPL
555211	2013 TT_{24}	—	December 2, 2008	Kitt Peak	Spacewatch	·	1.8 km	MPC · JPL
555212	2013 TE_{28}	—	September 10, 2007	Mount Lemmon	Mount Lemmon Survey	·	2.6 km	MPC · JPL
555213	2013 TH_{38}	—	September 6, 2008	Kitt Peak	Spacewatch	KOR	1.0 km	MPC · JPL
555214	2013 TN_{38}	—	November 2, 1999	Kitt Peak	Spacewatch	·	410 m	MPC · JPL
555215	2013 TV_{43}	—	October 3, 2013	Mount Lemmon	Mount Lemmon Survey	·	2.5 km	MPC · JPL
555216	2013 TA_{48}	—	October 22, 2003	Apache Point	SDSS	·	2.3 km	MPC · JPL
555217	2013 TB_{50}	—	November 8, 2008	Mount Lemmon	Mount Lemmon Survey	·	1.6 km	MPC · JPL
555218	2013 TT_{58}	—	September 3, 2008	Kitt Peak	Spacewatch	·	1.6 km	MPC · JPL
555219	2013 TD_{60}	—	October 4, 2013	Mount Lemmon	Mount Lemmon Survey	·	1.8 km	MPC · JPL
555220	2013 TX_{69}	—	July 29, 2008	Kitt Peak	Spacewatch	·	1.8 km	MPC · JPL
555221	2013 TB_{76}	—	November 6, 2008	Mount Lemmon	Mount Lemmon Survey	·	1.9 km	MPC · JPL
555222	2013 TB_{81}	—	September 14, 2013	Kitt Peak	Spacewatch	EUN	1.1 km	MPC · JPL
555223	2013 TP_{85}	—	March 1, 2011	Mount Lemmon	Mount Lemmon Survey	AST	1.5 km	MPC · JPL
555224	2013 TG_{87}	—	October 1, 2013	Mount Lemmon	Mount Lemmon Survey	HOF	1.9 km	MPC · JPL
555225	2013 TN_{87}	—	October 3, 2008	Kitt Peak	Spacewatch	·	1.4 km	MPC · JPL
555226	2013 TS_{89}	—	October 1, 2013	Kitt Peak	Spacewatch	·	2.3 km	MPC · JPL
555227 Claraisabella	2013 TH_{90}	Claraisabella	September 4, 2013	Calar Alto	F. Hormuth	KOR	1.1 km	MPC · JPL
555228	2013 TU_{91}	—	October 8, 2007	Mount Lemmon	Mount Lemmon Survey	·	2.5 km	MPC · JPL
555229	2013 TT_{95}	—	October 1, 2013	Kitt Peak	Spacewatch	·	1.7 km	MPC · JPL
555230	2013 TS_{99}	—	October 2, 2013	Kitt Peak	Spacewatch	EOS	1.4 km	MPC · JPL
555231	2013 TE_{100}	—	August 3, 2013	Haleakala	Pan-STARRS 1	·	1.7 km	MPC · JPL
555232	2013 TA_{102}	—	October 2, 2013	Mount Lemmon	Mount Lemmon Survey	TEL	1.1 km	MPC · JPL
555233	2013 TR_{110}	—	September 30, 2013	Mount Lemmon	Mount Lemmon Survey	·	2.3 km	MPC · JPL
555234	2013 TV_{112}	—	September 7, 2008	Mount Lemmon	Mount Lemmon Survey	·	1.5 km	MPC · JPL
555235	2013 TU_{113}	—	November 3, 2004	Palomar	NEAT	·	2.1 km	MPC · JPL
555236	2013 TO_{118}	—	October 4, 2013	Mount Lemmon	Mount Lemmon Survey	615	1.3 km	MPC · JPL
555237	2013 TU_{118}	—	September 11, 2007	Mount Lemmon	Mount Lemmon Survey	THB	2.6 km	MPC · JPL
555238	2013 TE_{119}	—	April 28, 2003	Kitt Peak	Spacewatch	HNS	1.4 km	MPC · JPL
555239	2013 TQ_{122}	—	November 12, 2005	Kitt Peak	Spacewatch	·	2.3 km	MPC · JPL
555240	2013 TY_{123}	—	October 9, 2004	Kitt Peak	Spacewatch	·	1.7 km	MPC · JPL
555241	2013 TF_{124}	—	October 5, 2013	Haleakala	Pan-STARRS 1	·	1.7 km	MPC · JPL
555242	2013 TK_{126}	—	October 5, 2013	Mount Lemmon	Mount Lemmon Survey	·	1.8 km	MPC · JPL
555243	2013 TZ_{127}	—	August 29, 2002	Palomar	NEAT	·	1.8 km	MPC · JPL
555244	2013 TM_{129}	—	August 25, 2008	Hibiscus	Teamo, N., S. F. Hönig	DOR	2.5 km	MPC · JPL
555245	2013 TM_{134}	—	October 12, 2013	Oukaïmeden	C. Rinner	·	1.7 km	MPC · JPL
555246	2013 TE_{137}	—	October 17, 2003	Apache Point	SDSS	·	2.1 km	MPC · JPL
555247	2013 TV_{139}	—	September 15, 2013	Mount Lemmon	Mount Lemmon Survey	EOS	1.4 km	MPC · JPL
555248	2013 TF_{140}	—	October 1, 2013	Mount Lemmon	Mount Lemmon Survey	KOR	1.1 km	MPC · JPL
555249	2013 TU_{143}	—	September 15, 2013	Haleakala	Pan-STARRS 1	·	1.5 km	MPC · JPL
555250	2013 TT_{148}	—	February 7, 2011	Mount Lemmon	Mount Lemmon Survey	·	1.3 km	MPC · JPL
555251	2013 TG_{158}	—	November 11, 2013	Kitt Peak	Spacewatch	KOR	950 m	MPC · JPL
555252	2013 TZ_{161}	—	April 1, 2003	Kitt Peak	Deep Ecliptic Survey	·	1.6 km	MPC · JPL
555253	2013 TE_{164}	—	October 3, 2013	Haleakala	Pan-STARRS 1	HOF	2.1 km	MPC · JPL
555254	2013 TB_{166}	—	October 2, 2013	Mount Lemmon	Mount Lemmon Survey	·	2.4 km	MPC · JPL
555255	2013 TE_{169}	—	October 5, 2013	Haleakala	Pan-STARRS 1	VER	2.4 km	MPC · JPL
555256	2013 TA_{171}	—	October 15, 2013	Oukaïmeden	M. Ory	·	2.2 km	MPC · JPL
555257	2013 TG_{171}	—	October 12, 2013	Catalina	CSS	·	1.4 km	MPC · JPL
555258	2013 TM_{174}	—	October 2, 2013	Kitt Peak	Spacewatch	LIX	2.4 km	MPC · JPL
555259	2013 TA_{179}	—	October 14, 2013	Kitt Peak	Spacewatch	TIR	2.2 km	MPC · JPL
555260	2013 TU_{182}	—	October 4, 2013	Kitt Peak	Spacewatch	EOS	1.7 km	MPC · JPL
555261	2013 TG_{183}	—	October 3, 2013	Kitt Peak	Spacewatch	·	1.9 km	MPC · JPL
555262	2013 TO_{189}	—	October 4, 2013	Mount Lemmon	Mount Lemmon Survey	·	2.3 km	MPC · JPL
555263	2013 TS_{190}	—	October 9, 2013	Mount Lemmon	Mount Lemmon Survey	·	1.5 km	MPC · JPL
555264	2013 TA_{193}	—	October 6, 2013	Kitt Peak	Spacewatch	THM	1.8 km	MPC · JPL
555265	2013 TB_{193}	—	October 3, 2013	Mount Lemmon	Mount Lemmon Survey	·	2.0 km	MPC · JPL
555266	2013 TK_{193}	—	October 12, 2013	Kitt Peak	Spacewatch	·	2.0 km	MPC · JPL
555267	2013 TL_{193}	—	October 6, 2013	Kitt Peak	Spacewatch	EOS	1.4 km	MPC · JPL
555268	2013 TR_{193}	—	October 9, 2013	Mount Lemmon	Mount Lemmon Survey	·	1.9 km	MPC · JPL
555269	2013 TC_{196}	—	March 28, 2011	Mount Lemmon	Mount Lemmon Survey	·	1.4 km	MPC · JPL
555270	2013 TH_{197}	—	October 3, 2013	Kitt Peak	Spacewatch	·	2.0 km	MPC · JPL
555271	2013 TY_{199}	—	October 12, 2013	Kitt Peak	Spacewatch	THM	1.8 km	MPC · JPL
555272	2013 TU_{200}	—	October 3, 2013	Mount Lemmon	Mount Lemmon Survey	L5	6.8 km	MPC · JPL
555273	2013 TY_{201}	—	October 3, 2013	Haleakala	Pan-STARRS 1	·	1.5 km	MPC · JPL
555274	2013 TJ_{204}	—	October 3, 2013	Kitt Peak	Spacewatch	·	2.5 km	MPC · JPL
555275	2013 TB_{207}	—	October 5, 2013	Haleakala	Pan-STARRS 1	KOR	920 m	MPC · JPL
555276	2013 TV_{213}	—	October 9, 2013	Mount Lemmon	Mount Lemmon Survey	L5	6.2 km	MPC · JPL
555277	2013 TZ_{213}	—	October 12, 2013	Kitt Peak	Spacewatch	·	610 m	MPC · JPL
555278	2013 UJ_{3}	—	December 10, 2005	Kitt Peak	Spacewatch	H	560 m	MPC · JPL
555279	2013 UR_{7}	—	November 4, 2004	Kitt Peak	Spacewatch	·	1.9 km	MPC · JPL
555280	2013 UY_{10}	—	October 5, 2013	Haleakala	Pan-STARRS 1	·	2.4 km	MPC · JPL
555281	2013 UP_{18}	—	September 24, 2008	Mount Lemmon	Mount Lemmon Survey	·	1.6 km	MPC · JPL
555282	2013 UA_{19}	—	May 27, 2012	Mount Lemmon	Mount Lemmon Survey	·	1.4 km	MPC · JPL
555283	2013 UD_{20}	—	December 3, 2005	Mauna Kea	A. Boattini	·	1.6 km	MPC · JPL
555284	2013 UJ_{20}	—	October 25, 2013	Kitt Peak	Spacewatch	·	1.9 km	MPC · JPL
555285	2013 UF_{23}	—	October 28, 2013	Mount Lemmon	Mount Lemmon Survey	·	2.3 km	MPC · JPL
555286	2013 UP_{24}	—	October 26, 2013	Kitt Peak	Spacewatch	·	2.2 km	MPC · JPL
555287	2013 UO_{28}	—	December 5, 2008	Kitt Peak	Spacewatch	·	2.0 km	MPC · JPL
555288	2013 UW_{28}	—	April 13, 2010	WISE	WISE	·	1.8 km	MPC · JPL
555289	2013 UU_{29}	—	October 31, 2013	Kitt Peak	Spacewatch	·	2.2 km	MPC · JPL
555290	2013 UB_{32}	—	January 17, 2015	Mount Lemmon	Mount Lemmon Survey	·	1.8 km	MPC · JPL
555291	2013 UC_{32}	—	October 30, 2013	Haleakala	Pan-STARRS 1	·	1.8 km	MPC · JPL
555292 Bakels	2013 UZ_{32}	Bakels	October 31, 2013	Piszkéstető	M. Langbroek, K. Sárneczky	·	2.9 km	MPC · JPL
555293	2013 UU_{33}	—	October 23, 2013	Mount Lemmon	Mount Lemmon Survey	KOR	1.1 km	MPC · JPL
555294	2013 UM_{35}	—	October 31, 2013	Mount Lemmon	Mount Lemmon Survey	·	2.4 km	MPC · JPL
555295	2013 US_{36}	—	October 23, 2013	Mount Lemmon	Mount Lemmon Survey	·	1.5 km	MPC · JPL
555296	2013 UU_{36}	—	October 31, 2013	Kitt Peak	Spacewatch	·	1.5 km	MPC · JPL
555297	2013 UX_{37}	—	October 23, 2013	Mount Lemmon	Mount Lemmon Survey	KOR	1.2 km	MPC · JPL
555298	2013 UY_{37}	—	October 23, 2013	Mount Lemmon	Mount Lemmon Survey	KOR	980 m	MPC · JPL
555299	2013 UF_{38}	—	October 25, 2013	Mount Lemmon	Mount Lemmon Survey	·	1.0 km	MPC · JPL
555300	2013 UF_{41}	—	September 26, 2013	Mount Lemmon	Mount Lemmon Survey	·	610 m	MPC · JPL

== 555301–555400 ==
back to top

Designation			Discovery			Properties		Ref
Permanent	Provisional	Named after	Date	Site	Discoverer(s)	Category	Diam.	Ref
555301	2013 UR_{42}	—	October 26, 2013	Mount Lemmon	Mount Lemmon Survey	·	490 m	MPC · JPL
555302	2013 VK_{1}	—	March 14, 2007	Mount Lemmon	Mount Lemmon Survey	·	1.5 km	MPC · JPL
555303	2013 VY_{2}	—	January 16, 2009	San Marcello	San Marcello	·	2.4 km	MPC · JPL
555304	2013 VX_{3}	—	October 24, 2013	Mount Lemmon	Mount Lemmon Survey	·	1.6 km	MPC · JPL
555305	2013 VH_{7}	—	October 12, 2013	Mount Lemmon	Mount Lemmon Survey	·	2.2 km	MPC · JPL
555306	2013 VQ_{8}	—	December 20, 2008	Mount Lemmon	Mount Lemmon Survey	·	1.5 km	MPC · JPL
555307	2013 VH_{15}	—	October 30, 2013	Haleakala	Pan-STARRS 1	·	2.0 km	MPC · JPL
555308	2013 VF_{17}	—	January 25, 2003	Palomar	NEAT	T_{j} (2.96)	3.3 km	MPC · JPL
555309	2013 VW_{18}	—	November 23, 2002	Palomar	NEAT	TIR	3.0 km	MPC · JPL
555310	2013 VK_{19}	—	October 27, 2013	Catalina	CSS	·	2.1 km	MPC · JPL
555311	2013 VW_{19}	—	July 19, 2001	Palomar	NEAT	·	3.4 km	MPC · JPL
555312	2013 VJ_{21}	—	November 1, 2013	Palomar	Palomar Transient Factory	·	3.2 km	MPC · JPL
555313	2013 VA_{23}	—	July 16, 2013	Haleakala	Pan-STARRS 1	TIR	2.6 km	MPC · JPL
555314	2013 VJ_{23}	—	October 26, 2013	Catalina	CSS	·	2.4 km	MPC · JPL
555315	2013 VE_{24}	—	November 19, 2008	Kitt Peak	Spacewatch	·	1.7 km	MPC · JPL
555316	2013 VO_{27}	—	November 2, 2013	Kitt Peak	Spacewatch	·	1.5 km	MPC · JPL
555317	2013 VC_{28}	—	November 2, 2013	Mount Lemmon	Mount Lemmon Survey	LIX	2.9 km	MPC · JPL
555318	2013 VV_{28}	—	November 8, 2013	Kitt Peak	Spacewatch	EOS	1.3 km	MPC · JPL
555319	2013 VX_{28}	—	October 8, 2012	Nogales	M. Schwartz, P. R. Holvorcem	·	2.5 km	MPC · JPL
555320	2013 VD_{30}	—	October 9, 2013	Mount Lemmon	Mount Lemmon Survey	EOS	1.4 km	MPC · JPL
555321	2013 VJ_{30}	—	November 11, 2013	Mount Lemmon	Mount Lemmon Survey	·	1.8 km	MPC · JPL
555322	2013 VL_{35}	—	November 9, 2013	Haleakala	Pan-STARRS 1	EOS	1.4 km	MPC · JPL
555323	2013 VT_{35}	—	November 12, 2013	Mount Lemmon	Mount Lemmon Survey	THB	2.2 km	MPC · JPL
555324	2013 VW_{36}	—	November 14, 2013	Mount Lemmon	Mount Lemmon Survey	·	1.9 km	MPC · JPL
555325	2013 VF_{37}	—	November 6, 2013	Haleakala	Pan-STARRS 1	·	2.4 km	MPC · JPL
555326	2013 VM_{41}	—	November 9, 2013	Haleakala	Pan-STARRS 1	·	1.6 km	MPC · JPL
555327	2013 VO_{41}	—	November 9, 2013	Catalina	CSS	BRA	1.2 km	MPC · JPL
555328	2013 VC_{48}	—	November 9, 2013	Haleakala	Pan-STARRS 1	·	1.7 km	MPC · JPL
555329	2013 VD_{48}	—	November 11, 2013	Kitt Peak	Spacewatch	EOS	1.5 km	MPC · JPL
555330	2013 VN_{48}	—	February 17, 2015	Haleakala	Pan-STARRS 1	EOS	1.4 km	MPC · JPL
555331	2013 VD_{51}	—	November 6, 2013	Haleakala	Pan-STARRS 1	EOS	1.6 km	MPC · JPL
555332	2013 VF_{51}	—	November 10, 2013	Mount Lemmon	Mount Lemmon Survey	·	1.9 km	MPC · JPL
555333	2013 VP_{51}	—	November 2, 2013	Mount Lemmon	Mount Lemmon Survey	·	2.0 km	MPC · JPL
555334	2013 VQ_{51}	—	November 10, 2013	Mount Lemmon	Mount Lemmon Survey	·	1.8 km	MPC · JPL
555335	2013 VA_{52}	—	November 1, 2013	Mount Lemmon	Mount Lemmon Survey	·	1.5 km	MPC · JPL
555336	2013 VH_{52}	—	November 14, 2013	Mount Lemmon	Mount Lemmon Survey	EOS	1.6 km	MPC · JPL
555337	2013 VW_{52}	—	November 8, 2013	Kitt Peak	Spacewatch	·	1.5 km	MPC · JPL
555338	2013 VE_{53}	—	November 9, 2013	Mount Lemmon	Mount Lemmon Survey	·	2.1 km	MPC · JPL
555339	2013 VJ_{53}	—	November 10, 2013	Mount Lemmon	Mount Lemmon Survey	·	2.0 km	MPC · JPL
555340	2013 VY_{53}	—	November 12, 2013	Kitt Peak	Spacewatch	·	1.8 km	MPC · JPL
555341	2013 VA_{54}	—	November 12, 2013	Mount Lemmon	Mount Lemmon Survey	·	1.8 km	MPC · JPL
555342	2013 VH_{54}	—	November 1, 2013	Mount Lemmon	Mount Lemmon Survey	·	2.2 km	MPC · JPL
555343	2013 VL_{61}	—	November 10, 2013	Mount Lemmon	Mount Lemmon Survey	·	2.7 km	MPC · JPL
555344	2013 VS_{62}	—	November 9, 2013	Mount Lemmon	Mount Lemmon Survey	3:2	3.8 km	MPC · JPL
555345	2013 VT_{62}	—	November 11, 2013	Mount Lemmon	Mount Lemmon Survey	NYS	800 m	MPC · JPL
555346	2013 VL_{63}	—	November 9, 2013	Haleakala	Pan-STARRS 1	·	490 m	MPC · JPL
555347	2013 WS_{1}	—	November 25, 2013	Nogales	M. Schwartz, P. R. Holvorcem	·	1.8 km	MPC · JPL
555348	2013 WP_{2}	—	November 26, 2013	Haleakala	Pan-STARRS 1	·	1.8 km	MPC · JPL
555349	2013 WB_{4}	—	August 7, 2000	Haleakala	NEAT	·	1.7 km	MPC · JPL
555350	2013 WV_{5}	—	November 6, 2013	Haleakala	Pan-STARRS 1	·	2.3 km	MPC · JPL
555351	2013 WJ_{6}	—	November 2, 2008	Mount Lemmon	Mount Lemmon Survey	·	2.4 km	MPC · JPL
555352	2013 WQ_{7}	—	November 1, 2013	Kitt Peak	Spacewatch	·	2.2 km	MPC · JPL
555353	2013 WT_{13}	—	November 27, 2013	Haleakala	Pan-STARRS 1	·	2.8 km	MPC · JPL
555354	2013 WS_{15}	—	November 27, 2013	Haleakala	Pan-STARRS 1	EOS	1.5 km	MPC · JPL
555355	2013 WB_{16}	—	November 2, 2013	Mount Lemmon	Mount Lemmon Survey	EOS	2.0 km	MPC · JPL
555356	2013 WQ_{16}	—	November 27, 2013	Haleakala	Pan-STARRS 1	EOS	1.4 km	MPC · JPL
555357	2013 WV_{17}	—	November 27, 2013	Haleakala	Pan-STARRS 1	·	1.5 km	MPC · JPL
555358	2013 WA_{19}	—	November 27, 2013	Haleakala	Pan-STARRS 1	·	2.0 km	MPC · JPL
555359	2013 WZ_{20}	—	November 27, 2013	Haleakala	Pan-STARRS 1	·	1.9 km	MPC · JPL
555360	2013 WL_{21}	—	September 19, 2003	Palomar	NEAT	·	1.9 km	MPC · JPL
555361	2013 WN_{22}	—	December 17, 2003	Kitt Peak	Spacewatch	·	2.0 km	MPC · JPL
555362	2013 WR_{22}	—	November 27, 2013	Haleakala	Pan-STARRS 1	·	2.3 km	MPC · JPL
555363	2013 WW_{23}	—	November 27, 2013	Haleakala	Pan-STARRS 1	·	1.8 km	MPC · JPL
555364	2013 WY_{25}	—	November 25, 2013	Mountain Meadows	Skillman, D.	·	1.7 km	MPC · JPL
555365	2013 WM_{27}	—	June 28, 2008	Siding Spring	SSS	·	2.0 km	MPC · JPL
555366	2013 WU_{29}	—	November 2, 2013	Kitt Peak	Spacewatch	EOS	1.6 km	MPC · JPL
555367	2013 WT_{31}	—	November 2, 2013	Kitt Peak	Spacewatch	·	2.6 km	MPC · JPL
555368	2013 WQ_{43}	—	November 11, 2013	Mount Lemmon	Mount Lemmon Survey	·	2.7 km	MPC · JPL
555369	2013 WB_{45}	—	November 30, 2003	Kitt Peak	Spacewatch	H	370 m	MPC · JPL
555370	2013 WC_{48}	—	July 18, 2013	Haleakala	Pan-STARRS 1	·	2.0 km	MPC · JPL
555371	2013 WD_{48}	—	December 5, 2008	Mount Lemmon	Mount Lemmon Survey	·	2.9 km	MPC · JPL
555372	2013 WG_{49}	—	August 13, 2012	Haleakala	Pan-STARRS 1	·	3.5 km	MPC · JPL
555373	2013 WS_{49}	—	November 25, 2013	Haleakala	Pan-STARRS 1	·	2.5 km	MPC · JPL
555374	2013 WU_{54}	—	November 10, 2013	Mount Lemmon	Mount Lemmon Survey	·	2.4 km	MPC · JPL
555375	2013 WM_{55}	—	November 8, 2013	Catalina	CSS	·	2.2 km	MPC · JPL
555376	2013 WK_{58}	—	September 19, 1998	Apache Point	SDSS Collaboration	NYS	1.2 km	MPC · JPL
555377	2013 WM_{58}	—	November 26, 2013	Haleakala	Pan-STARRS 1	·	1.7 km	MPC · JPL
555378	2013 WY_{59}	—	November 9, 2013	Kitt Peak	Spacewatch	·	1.6 km	MPC · JPL
555379	2013 WY_{62}	—	October 13, 2013	Calar Alto-CASADO	Proffe, G., Hellmich, S.	·	2.3 km	MPC · JPL
555380	2013 WA_{64}	—	November 29, 2013	Elena Remote	Oreshko, A.	THB	2.6 km	MPC · JPL
555381	2013 WF_{65}	—	November 8, 2013	Mount Lemmon	Mount Lemmon Survey	EOS	1.5 km	MPC · JPL
555382	2013 WW_{66}	—	February 7, 1999	Kitt Peak	Spacewatch	·	2.1 km	MPC · JPL
555383	2013 WE_{67}	—	September 10, 2002	Palomar	NEAT	·	2.5 km	MPC · JPL
555384	2013 WJ_{68}	—	November 7, 2008	Mount Lemmon	Mount Lemmon Survey	·	2.2 km	MPC · JPL
555385	2013 WO_{68}	—	October 30, 2013	Haleakala	Pan-STARRS 1	·	2.5 km	MPC · JPL
555386	2013 WA_{69}	—	March 25, 2011	Haleakala	Pan-STARRS 1	·	1.9 km	MPC · JPL
555387	2013 WX_{76}	—	October 26, 2013	Mount Lemmon	Mount Lemmon Survey	·	1.7 km	MPC · JPL
555388	2013 WJ_{79}	—	November 26, 2013	Mount Lemmon	Mount Lemmon Survey	·	2.1 km	MPC · JPL
555389	2013 WP_{79}	—	November 26, 2013	Mount Lemmon	Mount Lemmon Survey	EOS	1.4 km	MPC · JPL
555390	2013 WA_{80}	—	November 26, 2013	Mount Lemmon	Mount Lemmon Survey	EOS	2.3 km	MPC · JPL
555391	2013 WH_{81}	—	April 27, 2012	Haleakala	Pan-STARRS 1	·	1.9 km	MPC · JPL
555392	2013 WT_{87}	—	November 27, 2013	Haleakala	Pan-STARRS 1	·	2.3 km	MPC · JPL
555393	2013 WA_{91}	—	November 19, 2008	Kitt Peak	Spacewatch	KOR	1.2 km	MPC · JPL
555394	2013 WZ_{94}	—	October 9, 2013	Mount Lemmon	Mount Lemmon Survey	·	2.4 km	MPC · JPL
555395	2013 WA_{96}	—	October 26, 2013	Kitt Peak	Spacewatch	EOS	1.6 km	MPC · JPL
555396	2013 WK_{100}	—	November 29, 2013	Mount Lemmon	Mount Lemmon Survey	·	1.8 km	MPC · JPL
555397	2013 WK_{109}	—	October 22, 2013	Mount Lemmon	Mount Lemmon Survey	·	1.6 km	MPC · JPL
555398	2013 WU_{109}	—	August 21, 2006	Kitt Peak	Spacewatch	·	2.2 km	MPC · JPL
555399	2013 WT_{110}	—	April 10, 2010	Kitt Peak	Spacewatch	·	5.2 km	MPC · JPL
555400	2013 WX_{110}	—	September 11, 2007	Mount Lemmon	Mount Lemmon Survey	THM	1.6 km	MPC · JPL

== 555401–555500 ==
back to top

Designation			Discovery			Properties		Ref
Permanent	Provisional	Named after	Date	Site	Discoverer(s)	Category	Diam.	Ref
555401	2013 WH_{111}	—	November 28, 2013	Mount Lemmon	Mount Lemmon Survey	·	2.3 km	MPC · JPL
555402	2013 WW_{111}	—	November 27, 2013	Haleakala	Pan-STARRS 1	EOS	1.4 km	MPC · JPL
555403	2013 WR_{112}	—	August 30, 2008	Charleston	R. Holmes	·	1.4 km	MPC · JPL
555404	2013 WN_{114}	—	November 28, 2013	Mount Lemmon	Mount Lemmon Survey	EMA	2.9 km	MPC · JPL
555405	2013 WX_{120}	—	November 27, 2013	Haleakala	Pan-STARRS 1	·	2.2 km	MPC · JPL
555406	2013 WN_{121}	—	November 28, 2013	Haleakala	Pan-STARRS 1	EOS	1.3 km	MPC · JPL
555407	2013 WM_{123}	—	February 16, 2015	Haleakala	Pan-STARRS 1	·	1.6 km	MPC · JPL
555408	2013 WS_{124}	—	November 2, 2013	Mount Lemmon	Mount Lemmon Survey	(1298)	1.7 km	MPC · JPL
555409	2013 WW_{124}	—	November 29, 2013	Kitt Peak	Spacewatch	·	2.2 km	MPC · JPL
555410	2013 WA_{126}	—	November 27, 2013	Haleakala	Pan-STARRS 1	EOS	1.5 km	MPC · JPL
555411	2013 WP_{126}	—	November 27, 2013	Haleakala	Pan-STARRS 1	·	1.8 km	MPC · JPL
555412	2013 WV_{126}	—	November 27, 2013	Haleakala	Pan-STARRS 1	EOS	1.7 km	MPC · JPL
555413	2013 WR_{128}	—	November 27, 2013	Haleakala	Pan-STARRS 1	EOS	1.5 km	MPC · JPL
555414	2013 WZ_{130}	—	November 27, 2013	Haleakala	Pan-STARRS 1	EOS	1.6 km	MPC · JPL
555415	2013 WF_{131}	—	November 27, 2013	Haleakala	Pan-STARRS 1	·	1.5 km	MPC · JPL
555416	2013 WJ_{134}	—	November 26, 2013	Mount Lemmon	Mount Lemmon Survey	·	720 m	MPC · JPL
555417	2013 XC_{1}	—	December 2, 2013	Elena Remote	Oreshko, A.	TIR	2.2 km	MPC · JPL
555418	2013 XM_{1}	—	November 26, 2013	Haleakala	Pan-STARRS 1	EOS	1.8 km	MPC · JPL
555419	2013 XB_{2}	—	November 20, 2006	Kitt Peak	Spacewatch	·	3.0 km	MPC · JPL
555420	2013 XW_{4}	—	June 4, 2011	Mount Lemmon	Mount Lemmon Survey	·	4.3 km	MPC · JPL
555421	2013 XU_{9}	—	November 28, 2013	Mount Lemmon	Mount Lemmon Survey	·	1.9 km	MPC · JPL
555422	2013 XY_{10}	—	November 1, 2013	Kitt Peak	Spacewatch	·	2.2 km	MPC · JPL
555423	2013 XT_{15}	—	October 31, 2013	Mount Lemmon	Mount Lemmon Survey	EUP	2.8 km	MPC · JPL
555424	2013 XZ_{19}	—	December 11, 2013	Mount Lemmon	Mount Lemmon Survey	·	3.2 km	MPC · JPL
555425	2013 XN_{20}	—	December 12, 2013	Mount Lemmon	Mount Lemmon Survey	·	1.9 km	MPC · JPL
555426	2013 XD_{26}	—	December 4, 2013	Haleakala	Pan-STARRS 1	other TNO	135 km	MPC · JPL
555427	2013 XF_{27}	—	January 15, 2009	Kitt Peak	Spacewatch	·	3.5 km	MPC · JPL
555428	2013 XP_{28}	—	January 29, 2015	Haleakala	Pan-STARRS 1	·	2.4 km	MPC · JPL
555429	2013 XO_{29}	—	December 11, 2013	Haleakala	Pan-STARRS 1	·	2.1 km	MPC · JPL
555430	2013 XK_{32}	—	December 11, 2013	Mount Lemmon	Mount Lemmon Survey	VER	2.4 km	MPC · JPL
555431	2013 XT_{32}	—	December 11, 2013	Haleakala	Pan-STARRS 1	·	2.1 km	MPC · JPL
555432	2013 XG_{35}	—	December 13, 2013	Mount Lemmon	Mount Lemmon Survey	·	2.4 km	MPC · JPL
555433	2013 XJ_{35}	—	January 29, 2003	Apache Point	SDSS Collaboration	·	2.4 km	MPC · JPL
555434	2013 XL_{35}	—	December 7, 2013	Mount Lemmon	Mount Lemmon Survey	EOS	1.3 km	MPC · JPL
555435	2013 XH_{38}	—	December 3, 2013	Mount Lemmon	Mount Lemmon Survey	(8737)	2.3 km	MPC · JPL
555436	2013 YX_{1}	—	December 23, 2013	Mount Lemmon	Mount Lemmon Survey	·	3.0 km	MPC · JPL
555437	2013 YA_{5}	—	December 23, 2013	Mount Lemmon	Mount Lemmon Survey	·	2.5 km	MPC · JPL
555438	2013 YJ_{5}	—	November 2, 2007	Kitt Peak	Spacewatch	·	2.1 km	MPC · JPL
555439	2013 YD_{9}	—	November 12, 2001	Apache Point	SDSS Collaboration	VER	2.8 km	MPC · JPL
555440	2013 YT_{9}	—	December 24, 2013	Mount Lemmon	Mount Lemmon Survey	·	530 m	MPC · JPL
555441	2013 YJ_{10}	—	December 24, 2013	Mount Lemmon	Mount Lemmon Survey	·	2.5 km	MPC · JPL
555442	2013 YG_{14}	—	September 18, 2003	Palomar	NEAT	·	650 m	MPC · JPL
555443	2013 YX_{14}	—	December 13, 2013	Mount Lemmon	Mount Lemmon Survey	·	2.6 km	MPC · JPL
555444	2013 YA_{15}	—	September 15, 2007	Mount Lemmon	Mount Lemmon Survey	·	2.0 km	MPC · JPL
555445	2013 YF_{15}	—	February 9, 2004	Palomar	NEAT	·	3.0 km	MPC · JPL
555446	2013 YW_{16}	—	December 24, 2013	Mount Lemmon	Mount Lemmon Survey	VER	2.1 km	MPC · JPL
555447	2013 YD_{19}	—	April 10, 2005	Kitt Peak	Deep Ecliptic Survey	EOS	1.8 km	MPC · JPL
555448	2013 YN_{21}	—	November 14, 2013	Oukaïmeden	C. Rinner	·	1.4 km	MPC · JPL
555449	2013 YZ_{22}	—	March 11, 2005	Mount Lemmon	Mount Lemmon Survey	·	1.8 km	MPC · JPL
555450	2013 YP_{23}	—	February 25, 2007	Mount Lemmon	Mount Lemmon Survey	NYS	1.0 km	MPC · JPL
555451	2013 YE_{26}	—	November 28, 2013	Haleakala	Pan-STARRS 1	·	2.0 km	MPC · JPL
555452	2013 YG_{27}	—	December 10, 2013	Mount Lemmon	Mount Lemmon Survey	·	2.8 km	MPC · JPL
555453	2013 YE_{28}	—	October 31, 2007	Catalina	CSS	EOS	2.5 km	MPC · JPL
555454	2013 YF_{29}	—	November 1, 2013	Kitt Peak	Spacewatch	·	2.5 km	MPC · JPL
555455	2013 YA_{34}	—	August 12, 2012	Kitt Peak	Spacewatch	LIX	3.3 km	MPC · JPL
555456	2013 YB_{35}	—	October 26, 2013	Mount Lemmon	Mount Lemmon Survey	·	2.7 km	MPC · JPL
555457	2013 YN_{36}	—	December 27, 2013	Mount Lemmon	Mount Lemmon Survey	EOS	1.4 km	MPC · JPL
555458	2013 YP_{37}	—	October 15, 2007	Catalina	CSS	·	3.1 km	MPC · JPL
555459	2013 YG_{38}	—	November 24, 2013	Haleakala	Pan-STARRS 1	·	2.1 km	MPC · JPL
555460	2013 YO_{39}	—	May 1, 2006	Kitt Peak	Spacewatch	·	1.1 km	MPC · JPL
555461	2013 YA_{41}	—	September 1, 2002	Palomar	NEAT	·	2.7 km	MPC · JPL
555462	2013 YG_{43}	—	December 26, 2013	Kitt Peak	Spacewatch	·	2.0 km	MPC · JPL
555463	2013 YD_{44}	—	August 13, 2012	Kitt Peak	Spacewatch	·	2.5 km	MPC · JPL
555464	2013 YF_{44}	—	December 26, 2013	Haleakala	Pan-STARRS 1	·	1.8 km	MPC · JPL
555465	2013 YV_{44}	—	November 14, 2003	Palomar	NEAT	·	780 m	MPC · JPL
555466	2013 YA_{46}	—	December 27, 2013	Kitt Peak	Spacewatch	·	2.2 km	MPC · JPL
555467	2013 YN_{46}	—	December 5, 2007	Mount Lemmon	Mount Lemmon Survey	·	2.6 km	MPC · JPL
555468 Tokarczuk	2013 YH_{47}	Tokarczuk	September 12, 2013	Tincana	M. Kusiak, M. Żołnowski	·	1.9 km	MPC · JPL
555469	2013 YZ_{48}	—	January 8, 2007	Kitt Peak	Spacewatch	PHO	870 m	MPC · JPL
555470	2013 YD_{53}	—	December 11, 2013	Mount Lemmon	Mount Lemmon Survey	·	1.6 km	MPC · JPL
555471	2013 YF_{53}	—	October 16, 2007	Kitt Peak	Spacewatch	·	1.7 km	MPC · JPL
555472	2013 YU_{53}	—	November 28, 2013	Mount Lemmon	Mount Lemmon Survey	·	2.4 km	MPC · JPL
555473	2013 YX_{54}	—	December 25, 2013	Mount Lemmon	Mount Lemmon Survey	EOS	1.6 km	MPC · JPL
555474	2013 YV_{55}	—	August 1, 2001	Palomar	NEAT	·	3.3 km	MPC · JPL
555475	2013 YE_{57}	—	November 4, 2007	Kitt Peak	Spacewatch	·	2.7 km	MPC · JPL
555476	2013 YM_{57}	—	December 26, 2013	Haleakala	Pan-STARRS 1	EOS	1.9 km	MPC · JPL
555477	2013 YT_{60}	—	November 17, 2007	Kitt Peak	Spacewatch	·	2.5 km	MPC · JPL
555478	2013 YF_{61}	—	December 27, 2013	Kitt Peak	Spacewatch	EOS	1.9 km	MPC · JPL
555479	2013 YN_{61}	—	December 27, 2013	Kitt Peak	Spacewatch	EOS	1.7 km	MPC · JPL
555480	2013 YD_{63}	—	December 27, 2013	Kitt Peak	Spacewatch	·	460 m	MPC · JPL
555481	2013 YC_{64}	—	March 8, 2003	Palomar	NEAT	·	4.4 km	MPC · JPL
555482	2013 YL_{64}	—	October 3, 2013	Kitt Peak	Spacewatch	MRX	1 km	MPC · JPL
555483	2013 YX_{67}	—	December 30, 2013	Mount Lemmon	Mount Lemmon Survey	·	2.8 km	MPC · JPL
555484	2013 YM_{72}	—	September 13, 2007	Mount Lemmon	Mount Lemmon Survey	·	2.0 km	MPC · JPL
555485	2013 YP_{72}	—	November 28, 2013	Mount Lemmon	Mount Lemmon Survey	·	1.5 km	MPC · JPL
555486	2013 YP_{74}	—	April 10, 2010	Mount Lemmon	Mount Lemmon Survey	·	2.8 km	MPC · JPL
555487	2013 YV_{74}	—	October 7, 2002	Haleakala	NEAT	·	2.3 km	MPC · JPL
555488	2013 YF_{78}	—	September 19, 2001	Apache Point	SDSS	·	3.6 km	MPC · JPL
555489	2013 YP_{79}	—	August 27, 2005	Anderson Mesa	LONEOS	·	4.8 km	MPC · JPL
555490	2013 YC_{80}	—	January 31, 2009	Mount Lemmon	Mount Lemmon Survey	VER	2.5 km	MPC · JPL
555491	2013 YK_{80}	—	October 8, 2012	Haleakala	Pan-STARRS 1	·	2.1 km	MPC · JPL
555492	2013 YM_{80}	—	February 8, 2011	Mount Lemmon	Mount Lemmon Survey	·	520 m	MPC · JPL
555493	2013 YU_{80}	—	December 10, 2013	Mount Lemmon	Mount Lemmon Survey	·	2.2 km	MPC · JPL
555494	2013 YA_{82}	—	December 28, 2013	Kitt Peak	Spacewatch	·	2.4 km	MPC · JPL
555495	2013 YD_{82}	—	December 28, 2013	Kitt Peak	Spacewatch	EOS	1.8 km	MPC · JPL
555496	2013 YP_{84}	—	October 21, 2006	Mount Lemmon	Mount Lemmon Survey	·	3.0 km	MPC · JPL
555497	2013 YQ_{84}	—	December 28, 2013	Kitt Peak	Spacewatch	·	2.5 km	MPC · JPL
555498	2013 YQ_{87}	—	November 13, 2007	Kitt Peak	Spacewatch	·	2.2 km	MPC · JPL
555499	2013 YQ_{91}	—	December 25, 1998	Kitt Peak	Spacewatch	·	1.6 km	MPC · JPL
555500	2013 YD_{92}	—	December 7, 2013	Kitt Peak	Spacewatch	V	440 m	MPC · JPL

== 555501–555600 ==
back to top

Designation			Discovery			Properties		Ref
Permanent	Provisional	Named after	Date	Site	Discoverer(s)	Category	Diam.	Ref
555501	2013 YB_{94}	—	July 27, 2011	Haleakala	Pan-STARRS 1	·	2.5 km	MPC · JPL
555502	2013 YB_{95}	—	December 20, 2007	Kitt Peak	Spacewatch	·	2.9 km	MPC · JPL
555503	2013 YV_{97}	—	April 9, 2010	Mount Lemmon	Mount Lemmon Survey	·	2.4 km	MPC · JPL
555504	2013 YO_{99}	—	August 14, 2012	Kitt Peak	Spacewatch	·	2.1 km	MPC · JPL
555505	2013 YL_{100}	—	October 18, 2012	Haleakala	Pan-STARRS 1	·	2.4 km	MPC · JPL
555506	2013 YK_{103}	—	December 22, 2008	Mount Lemmon	Mount Lemmon Survey	·	2.2 km	MPC · JPL
555507	2013 YD_{104}	—	October 30, 2013	Haleakala	Pan-STARRS 1	·	2.1 km	MPC · JPL
555508	2013 YW_{106}	—	December 25, 2013	Kitt Peak	Spacewatch	·	2.3 km	MPC · JPL
555509	2013 YY_{106}	—	December 30, 2013	Haleakala	Pan-STARRS 1	·	2.1 km	MPC · JPL
555510	2013 YR_{107}	—	November 2, 2013	Mount Lemmon	Mount Lemmon Survey	·	2.1 km	MPC · JPL
555511	2013 YJ_{108}	—	December 1, 2008	Mount Lemmon	Mount Lemmon Survey	TIR	2.6 km	MPC · JPL
555512	2013 YS_{111}	—	September 30, 2005	Mount Lemmon	Mount Lemmon Survey	(5)	1.2 km	MPC · JPL
555513	2013 YJ_{114}	—	February 26, 2011	Mount Lemmon	Mount Lemmon Survey	·	790 m	MPC · JPL
555514	2013 YR_{117}	—	December 14, 2007	Kitt Peak	Spacewatch	·	2.4 km	MPC · JPL
555515	2013 YC_{118}	—	August 11, 2001	Palomar	NEAT	·	2.5 km	MPC · JPL
555516	2013 YE_{118}	—	November 28, 2013	Kitt Peak	Spacewatch	·	3.0 km	MPC · JPL
555517	2013 YV_{119}	—	November 12, 2001	Apache Point	SDSS Collaboration	VER	1.9 km	MPC · JPL
555518	2013 YY_{120}	—	December 30, 2013	Haleakala	Pan-STARRS 1	·	970 m	MPC · JPL
555519	2013 YE_{123}	—	January 9, 2011	Mount Lemmon	Mount Lemmon Survey	·	690 m	MPC · JPL
555520	2013 YQ_{123}	—	November 11, 2001	Apache Point	SDSS Collaboration	EOS	2.3 km	MPC · JPL
555521	2013 YR_{124}	—	December 30, 2013	Kitt Peak	Spacewatch	·	600 m	MPC · JPL
555522	2013 YC_{125}	—	August 12, 2006	Palomar	NEAT	EOS	2.3 km	MPC · JPL
555523	2013 YZ_{131}	—	October 13, 2007	Anderson Mesa	LONEOS	·	2.5 km	MPC · JPL
555524	2013 YR_{132}	—	December 31, 2013	Mount Lemmon	Mount Lemmon Survey	EOS	1.7 km	MPC · JPL
555525	2013 YA_{133}	—	November 2, 2007	Kitt Peak	Spacewatch	·	2.7 km	MPC · JPL
555526	2013 YH_{137}	—	December 4, 2013	Haleakala	Pan-STARRS 1	TIR	2.6 km	MPC · JPL
555527	2013 YW_{140}	—	December 21, 2008	Kitt Peak	Spacewatch	·	1.8 km	MPC · JPL
555528	2013 YF_{141}	—	December 14, 2010	Mount Lemmon	Mount Lemmon Survey	·	550 m	MPC · JPL
555529	2013 YZ_{141}	—	October 13, 2002	Kitt Peak	Spacewatch	·	2.4 km	MPC · JPL
555530	2013 YO_{142}	—	December 31, 2013	Mount Lemmon	Mount Lemmon Survey	·	2.8 km	MPC · JPL
555531	2013 YC_{143}	—	January 16, 2009	Kitt Peak	Spacewatch	·	1.8 km	MPC · JPL
555532	2013 YD_{143}	—	December 3, 2013	Mount Lemmon	Mount Lemmon Survey	·	580 m	MPC · JPL
555533	2013 YJ_{143}	—	December 3, 2013	Mount Lemmon	Mount Lemmon Survey	·	1.9 km	MPC · JPL
555534	2013 YT_{146}	—	May 8, 2010	Mount Lemmon	Mount Lemmon Survey	VER	2.3 km	MPC · JPL
555535	2013 YZ_{146}	—	December 4, 2007	Mount Lemmon	Mount Lemmon Survey	·	1.9 km	MPC · JPL
555536	2013 YG_{147}	—	December 31, 2013	Mount Lemmon	Mount Lemmon Survey	·	2.4 km	MPC · JPL
555537	2013 YM_{152}	—	December 29, 2013	Haleakala	Pan-STARRS 1	·	2.0 km	MPC · JPL
555538	2013 YR_{152}	—	December 30, 2013	Mount Lemmon	Mount Lemmon Survey	·	2.8 km	MPC · JPL
555539	2013 YD_{153}	—	December 31, 2013	Mount Lemmon	Mount Lemmon Survey	·	2.3 km	MPC · JPL
555540	2013 YG_{154}	—	October 6, 2012	Haleakala	Pan-STARRS 1	·	2.7 km	MPC · JPL
555541	2013 YF_{156}	—	February 23, 2015	Haleakala	Pan-STARRS 1	TIR	2.9 km	MPC · JPL
555542	2013 YR_{158}	—	December 23, 2013	Mount Lemmon	Mount Lemmon Survey	·	590 m	MPC · JPL
555543	2013 YC_{159}	—	December 29, 2013	Haleakala	Pan-STARRS 1	·	2.6 km	MPC · JPL
555544	2013 YX_{160}	—	December 29, 2013	Haleakala	Pan-STARRS 1	EOS	1.3 km	MPC · JPL
555545	2013 YU_{161}	—	December 24, 2013	Mount Lemmon	Mount Lemmon Survey	·	2.3 km	MPC · JPL
555546	2013 YC_{162}	—	November 12, 2001	Apache Point	SDSS	·	2.8 km	MPC · JPL
555547	2013 YL_{162}	—	December 28, 2013	Mount Lemmon	Mount Lemmon Survey	EOS	1.7 km	MPC · JPL
555548	2013 YU_{166}	—	December 31, 2013	Kitt Peak	Spacewatch	·	550 m	MPC · JPL
555549	2014 AE	—	January 15, 2009	Kitt Peak	Spacewatch	THM	1.7 km	MPC · JPL
555550	2014 AX	—	January 1, 2014	Haleakala	Pan-STARRS 1	·	3.6 km	MPC · JPL
555551	2014 AU_{1}	—	November 21, 2001	Kitt Peak	Spacewatch	·	3.4 km	MPC · JPL
555552	2014 AV_{2}	—	January 10, 2007	Kitt Peak	Spacewatch	·	600 m	MPC · JPL
555553	2014 AS_{3}	—	January 29, 2003	Kitt Peak	Spacewatch	·	3.6 km	MPC · JPL
555554	2014 AE_{4}	—	January 1, 2014	Haleakala	Pan-STARRS 1	·	530 m	MPC · JPL
555555	2014 AG_{4}	—	November 18, 2007	Mount Lemmon	Mount Lemmon Survey	HYG	2.5 km	MPC · JPL
555556	2014 AZ_{10}	—	September 20, 2009	Kitt Peak	Spacewatch	(2076)	710 m	MPC · JPL
555557	2014 AC_{12}	—	October 4, 2002	Palomar	NEAT	·	2.7 km	MPC · JPL
555558	2014 AD_{12}	—	December 29, 2008	Mount Lemmon	Mount Lemmon Survey	·	2.3 km	MPC · JPL
555559	2014 AG_{17}	—	January 1, 2014	Kitt Peak	Spacewatch	·	2.7 km	MPC · JPL
555560	2014 AK_{18}	—	June 1, 2005	Mount Lemmon	Mount Lemmon Survey	EOS	1.7 km	MPC · JPL
555561	2014 AV_{18}	—	January 1, 2014	Haleakala	Pan-STARRS 1	H	390 m	MPC · JPL
555562	2014 AK_{19}	—	October 6, 2012	Haleakala	Pan-STARRS 1	·	3.0 km	MPC · JPL
555563	2014 AJ_{20}	—	October 28, 2013	Kitt Peak	Spacewatch	EOS	2.0 km	MPC · JPL
555564	2014 AO_{23}	—	January 3, 2014	Kitt Peak	Spacewatch	·	2.3 km	MPC · JPL
555565	2014 AF_{24}	—	November 11, 2001	Apache Point	SDSS Collaboration	·	2.5 km	MPC · JPL
555566	2014 AR_{24}	—	August 13, 2012	Haleakala	Pan-STARRS 1	·	550 m	MPC · JPL
555567	2014 AT_{27}	—	December 31, 2013	Mount Lemmon	Mount Lemmon Survey	·	2.9 km	MPC · JPL
555568	2014 AR_{29}	—	December 24, 2013	Mount Lemmon	Mount Lemmon Survey	(5931)	3.0 km	MPC · JPL
555569	2014 AQ_{30}	—	October 11, 2012	Haleakala	Pan-STARRS 1	·	2.1 km	MPC · JPL
555570	2014 AU_{30}	—	September 25, 2012	Kitt Peak	Spacewatch	·	2.5 km	MPC · JPL
555571	2014 AD_{31}	—	November 16, 2006	Kitt Peak	Spacewatch	·	580 m	MPC · JPL
555572	2014 AO_{31}	—	January 4, 2014	Mount Lemmon	Mount Lemmon Survey	·	2.9 km	MPC · JPL
555573	2014 AS_{31}	—	October 19, 2007	Mount Lemmon	Mount Lemmon Survey	·	3.1 km	MPC · JPL
555574	2014 AU_{33}	—	January 2, 2014	Kitt Peak	Spacewatch	EOS	1.8 km	MPC · JPL
555575	2014 AW_{35}	—	May 1, 2011	Haleakala	Pan-STARRS 1	·	2.3 km	MPC · JPL
555576	2014 AX_{35}	—	October 9, 2007	Kitt Peak	Spacewatch	·	2.7 km	MPC · JPL
555577	2014 AZ_{37}	—	December 25, 2013	Mount Lemmon	Mount Lemmon Survey	·	600 m	MPC · JPL
555578	2014 AM_{39}	—	March 20, 2003	Palomar	NEAT	·	5.5 km	MPC · JPL
555579	2014 AK_{40}	—	January 4, 2014	Mount Lemmon	Mount Lemmon Survey	·	2.7 km	MPC · JPL
555580	2014 AF_{42}	—	October 6, 2012	Haleakala	Pan-STARRS 1	·	3.1 km	MPC · JPL
555581	2014 AU_{44}	—	April 7, 2008	Kitt Peak	Spacewatch	·	560 m	MPC · JPL
555582	2014 AY_{44}	—	December 21, 2003	Socorro	LINEAR	·	890 m	MPC · JPL
555583	2014 AA_{47}	—	December 26, 2013	Kitt Peak	Spacewatch	·	530 m	MPC · JPL
555584	2014 AM_{47}	—	January 7, 2014	Kitt Peak	Spacewatch	·	630 m	MPC · JPL
555585	2014 AN_{48}	—	November 22, 2006	Mount Lemmon	Mount Lemmon Survey	·	600 m	MPC · JPL
555586	2014 AA_{50}	—	March 16, 2004	Kitt Peak	Spacewatch	EOS	2.5 km	MPC · JPL
555587	2014 AG_{50}	—	November 8, 2009	Mount Lemmon	Mount Lemmon Survey	·	660 m	MPC · JPL
555588	2014 AJ_{57}	—	September 29, 2005	Kitt Peak	Spacewatch	·	800 m	MPC · JPL
555589	2014 AH_{59}	—	January 5, 2014	Haleakala	Pan-STARRS 1	VER	2.2 km	MPC · JPL
555590	2014 AE_{61}	—	January 1, 2014	Haleakala	Pan-STARRS 1	·	1.7 km	MPC · JPL
555591	2014 AF_{61}	—	January 1, 2014	Haleakala	Pan-STARRS 1	cubewano (hot)	158 km	MPC · JPL
555592	2014 AZ_{61}	—	May 12, 2015	Mount Lemmon	Mount Lemmon Survey	·	800 m	MPC · JPL
555593	2014 AE_{62}	—	January 1, 2014	Kitt Peak	Spacewatch	·	2.9 km	MPC · JPL
555594	2014 AH_{62}	—	January 5, 2014	Haleakala	Pan-STARRS 1	LUT	3.3 km	MPC · JPL
555595	2014 AA_{65}	—	October 26, 2016	Mount Lemmon	Mount Lemmon Survey	·	810 m	MPC · JPL
555596	2014 AF_{65}	—	May 1, 2016	Haleakala	Pan-STARRS 1	EOS	1.5 km	MPC · JPL
555597	2014 AO_{65}	—	July 5, 2016	Mount Lemmon	Mount Lemmon Survey	·	2.8 km	MPC · JPL
555598	2014 AR_{65}	—	June 24, 2017	Haleakala	Pan-STARRS 1	EOS	1.6 km	MPC · JPL
555599	2014 AW_{67}	—	January 10, 2014	Kitt Peak	Spacewatch	·	530 m	MPC · JPL
555600	2014 AZ_{67}	—	January 3, 2014	Mount Lemmon	Mount Lemmon Survey	·	2.7 km	MPC · JPL

== 555601–555700 ==
back to top

Designation			Discovery			Properties		Ref
Permanent	Provisional	Named after	Date	Site	Discoverer(s)	Category	Diam.	Ref
555601	2014 AL_{68}	—	January 1, 2014	Haleakala	Pan-STARRS 1	·	3.2 km	MPC · JPL
555602	2014 AY_{68}	—	January 7, 2014	Mount Lemmon	Mount Lemmon Survey	·	2.7 km	MPC · JPL
555603	2014 AD_{70}	—	January 1, 2014	Mount Lemmon	Mount Lemmon Survey	TIR	2.6 km	MPC · JPL
555604	2014 BV_{3}	—	December 14, 2013	Mount Lemmon	Mount Lemmon Survey	·	740 m	MPC · JPL
555605	2014 BQ_{4}	—	December 28, 2013	Kitt Peak	Spacewatch	·	570 m	MPC · JPL
555606	2014 BN_{5}	—	April 29, 2008	Mount Lemmon	Mount Lemmon Survey	·	510 m	MPC · JPL
555607	2014 BY_{5}	—	December 21, 2006	Kitt Peak	Spacewatch	·	550 m	MPC · JPL
555608	2014 BT_{7}	—	January 7, 2014	Mount Lemmon	Mount Lemmon Survey	·	2.9 km	MPC · JPL
555609	2014 BC_{13}	—	January 2, 2009	Mount Lemmon	Mount Lemmon Survey	DOR	2.4 km	MPC · JPL
555610	2014 BH_{14}	—	October 3, 2006	Mount Lemmon	Mount Lemmon Survey	·	620 m	MPC · JPL
555611	2014 BX_{15}	—	January 1, 2014	Haleakala	Pan-STARRS 1	·	3.4 km	MPC · JPL
555612	2014 BJ_{18}	—	March 2, 2011	Kitt Peak	Spacewatch	·	500 m	MPC · JPL
555613	2014 BC_{19}	—	December 12, 2006	Marly	P. Kocher	·	740 m	MPC · JPL
555614	2014 BL_{21}	—	January 31, 2009	Mount Lemmon	Mount Lemmon Survey	·	2.8 km	MPC · JPL
555615	2014 BN_{22}	—	January 16, 2004	Kitt Peak	Spacewatch	·	610 m	MPC · JPL
555616	2014 BK_{24}	—	February 24, 2009	Kitt Peak	Spacewatch	·	2.4 km	MPC · JPL
555617	2014 BF_{27}	—	January 28, 2003	Socorro	LINEAR	·	3.7 km	MPC · JPL
555618	2014 BC_{31}	—	January 23, 2014	Mount Lemmon	Mount Lemmon Survey	·	2.4 km	MPC · JPL
555619	2014 BQ_{33}	—	August 23, 2006	Palomar	NEAT	·	3.5 km	MPC · JPL
555620	2014 BF_{34}	—	September 19, 2001	Apache Point	SDSS Collaboration	EOS	2.3 km	MPC · JPL
555621	2014 BK_{34}	—	October 15, 2001	Palomar	NEAT	·	3.3 km	MPC · JPL
555622	2014 BK_{35}	—	January 21, 2014	Kitt Peak	Spacewatch	·	670 m	MPC · JPL
555623	2014 BQ_{35}	—	March 26, 2011	Kitt Peak	Spacewatch	·	750 m	MPC · JPL
555624	2014 BU_{37}	—	February 21, 2007	Mount Nyukasa	Japan Aerospace Exploration Agency	·	940 m	MPC · JPL
555625	2014 BB_{39}	—	August 6, 2005	Palomar	NEAT	PHO	1.0 km	MPC · JPL
555626	2014 BO_{40}	—	December 16, 2007	Bergisch Gladbach	W. Bickel	·	2.7 km	MPC · JPL
555627	2014 BF_{42}	—	November 11, 2006	Kitt Peak	Spacewatch	·	610 m	MPC · JPL
555628	2014 BL_{43}	—	January 26, 2014	Haleakala	Pan-STARRS 1	EUP	2.7 km	MPC · JPL
555629	2014 BU_{46}	—	October 19, 2003	Socorro	LINEAR	·	2.3 km	MPC · JPL
555630	2014 BB_{47}	—	January 18, 2004	Palomar	NEAT	·	760 m	MPC · JPL
555631	2014 BR_{50}	—	January 11, 2014	Kitt Peak	Spacewatch	·	3.0 km	MPC · JPL
555632	2014 BZ_{57}	—	January 24, 2014	La Silla	D. L. Rabinowitz	cubewano (hot)	488 km	MPC · JPL
555633	2014 BK_{58}	—	October 27, 2006	Catalina	CSS	·	620 m	MPC · JPL
555634	2014 BZ_{61}	—	May 2, 2008	Catalina	CSS	·	760 m	MPC · JPL
555635	2014 BO_{62}	—	January 11, 2008	Mount Lemmon	Mount Lemmon Survey	·	2.5 km	MPC · JPL
555636	2014 BK_{64}	—	March 8, 2003	Anderson Mesa	LONEOS	·	4.2 km	MPC · JPL
555637	2014 BV_{65}	—	October 26, 2009	Kitt Peak	Spacewatch	·	650 m	MPC · JPL
555638	2014 BC_{66}	—	January 15, 2008	Kitt Peak	Spacewatch	·	2.9 km	MPC · JPL
555639	2014 BU_{66}	—	January 21, 2014	Mount Lemmon	Mount Lemmon Survey	(13314)	1.5 km	MPC · JPL
555640	2014 BF_{68}	—	May 15, 2009	Mount Lemmon	Mount Lemmon Survey	·	3.1 km	MPC · JPL
555641	2014 BR_{70}	—	July 18, 2012	Siding Spring	SSS	·	2.1 km	MPC · JPL
555642	2014 BP_{71}	—	January 21, 2015	Haleakala	Pan-STARRS 1	·	2.1 km	MPC · JPL
555643	2014 BV_{71}	—	March 17, 2015	Haleakala	Pan-STARRS 1	(69559)	3.1 km	MPC · JPL
555644	2014 BU_{75}	—	July 25, 2017	Haleakala	Pan-STARRS 1	·	2.4 km	MPC · JPL
555645	2014 BX_{75}	—	January 24, 2014	Haleakala	Pan-STARRS 1	ELF	3.3 km	MPC · JPL
555646	2014 BN_{76}	—	January 24, 2014	Haleakala	Pan-STARRS 1	·	2.2 km	MPC · JPL
555647	2014 BD_{77}	—	January 28, 2014	Kitt Peak	Spacewatch	·	500 m	MPC · JPL
555648	2014 BO_{78}	—	January 21, 2014	Kitt Peak	Spacewatch	·	1.4 km	MPC · JPL
555649	2014 BO_{79}	—	January 28, 2014	Mount Lemmon	Mount Lemmon Survey	·	730 m	MPC · JPL
555650	2014 BM_{80}	—	January 28, 2014	Mount Lemmon	Mount Lemmon Survey	·	2.1 km	MPC · JPL
555651	2014 BK_{81}	—	January 29, 2014	Kitt Peak	Spacewatch	·	2.5 km	MPC · JPL
555652	2014 BT_{81}	—	January 24, 2014	Haleakala	Pan-STARRS 1	MAS	490 m	MPC · JPL
555653	2014 CF	—	February 2, 2014	Catalina	CSS	·	3.5 km	MPC · JPL
555654	2014 CH	—	March 30, 2003	Kitt Peak	Deep Ecliptic Survey	·	3.1 km	MPC · JPL
555655	2014 CQ_{2}	—	December 11, 2013	Mount Lemmon	Mount Lemmon Survey	·	3.1 km	MPC · JPL
555656	2014 CS_{2}	—	September 28, 2009	Mount Lemmon	Mount Lemmon Survey	·	600 m	MPC · JPL
555657	2014 CQ_{3}	—	July 5, 2005	Mount Lemmon	Mount Lemmon Survey	·	1.3 km	MPC · JPL
555658	2014 CE_{4}	—	August 16, 2009	Kitt Peak	Spacewatch	·	610 m	MPC · JPL
555659	2014 CW_{5}	—	September 17, 2009	Mount Lemmon	Mount Lemmon Survey	·	680 m	MPC · JPL
555660	2014 CH_{6}	—	March 12, 2011	Mount Lemmon	Mount Lemmon Survey	·	660 m	MPC · JPL
555661	2014 CX_{6}	—	January 24, 2014	Haleakala	Pan-STARRS 1	·	1.4 km	MPC · JPL
555662	2014 CT_{7}	—	November 20, 2008	Kitt Peak	Spacewatch	·	1.5 km	MPC · JPL
555663	2014 CV_{7}	—	October 15, 2001	Palomar	NEAT	·	2.7 km	MPC · JPL
555664	2014 CS_{9}	—	January 3, 2014	Kitt Peak	Spacewatch	·	2.8 km	MPC · JPL
555665	2014 CT_{9}	—	December 5, 2007	Mount Lemmon	Mount Lemmon Survey	·	2.7 km	MPC · JPL
555666	2014 CJ_{10}	—	April 26, 2004	Kitt Peak	Spacewatch	·	760 m	MPC · JPL
555667	2014 CT_{11}	—	December 25, 2013	Mount Lemmon	Mount Lemmon Survey	·	3.9 km	MPC · JPL
555668	2014 CD_{12}	—	October 22, 2006	Mount Lemmon	Mount Lemmon Survey	·	760 m	MPC · JPL
555669	2014 CL_{12}	—	November 11, 2001	Apache Point	SDSS Collaboration	·	3.0 km	MPC · JPL
555670	2014 CQ_{14}	—	September 20, 2009	Catalina	CSS	·	1.1 km	MPC · JPL
555671	2014 CX_{15}	—	February 20, 2003	Haleakala	NEAT	·	1.2 km	MPC · JPL
555672	2014 CC_{17}	—	March 12, 2007	Kitt Peak	Spacewatch	·	640 m	MPC · JPL
555673	2014 CX_{17}	—	February 2, 2003	Palomar	NEAT	·	1.2 km	MPC · JPL
555674	2014 CE_{18}	—	February 17, 2007	Kitt Peak	Spacewatch	·	730 m	MPC · JPL
555675	2014 CY_{19}	—	November 22, 2006	Kitt Peak	Spacewatch	·	650 m	MPC · JPL
555676	2014 CZ_{19}	—	February 22, 2003	Palomar	NEAT	·	3.0 km	MPC · JPL
555677	2014 CB_{20}	—	February 16, 2004	Kitt Peak	Spacewatch	·	830 m	MPC · JPL
555678	2014 CO_{23}	—	February 9, 2014	Haleakala	Pan-STARRS 1	cubewano (hot)	412 km	MPC · JPL
555679	2014 CK_{29}	—	February 6, 2014	Mount Lemmon	Mount Lemmon Survey	·	650 m	MPC · JPL
555680	2014 DQ_{1}	—	May 8, 2008	Kitt Peak	Spacewatch	·	800 m	MPC · JPL
555681	2014 DB_{4}	—	October 21, 2006	Mount Lemmon	Mount Lemmon Survey	·	570 m	MPC · JPL
555682	2014 DS_{9}	—	October 15, 2001	Palomar	NEAT	·	2.6 km	MPC · JPL
555683	2014 DL_{10}	—	January 9, 2014	Mount Lemmon	Mount Lemmon Survey	URS	2.6 km	MPC · JPL
555684	2014 DO_{10}	—	September 28, 2009	Mount Lemmon	Mount Lemmon Survey	·	950 m	MPC · JPL
555685	2014 DD_{14}	—	May 1, 2009	Mount Lemmon	Mount Lemmon Survey	·	2.1 km	MPC · JPL
555686	2014 DQ_{15}	—	May 26, 2011	Mount Lemmon	Mount Lemmon Survey	·	550 m	MPC · JPL
555687	2014 DO_{17}	—	January 3, 2014	Mount Lemmon	Mount Lemmon Survey	HNS	1.0 km	MPC · JPL
555688	2014 DM_{19}	—	October 9, 2012	Haleakala	Pan-STARRS 1	·	690 m	MPC · JPL
555689	2014 DF_{20}	—	March 26, 2007	Kitt Peak	Spacewatch	·	770 m	MPC · JPL
555690	2014 DQ_{20}	—	March 15, 2007	Catalina	CSS	PHO	920 m	MPC · JPL
555691	2014 DO_{26}	—	February 1, 2003	Kitt Peak	Spacewatch	·	3.4 km	MPC · JPL
555692	2014 DX_{26}	—	October 8, 2002	Palomar	NEAT	·	2.8 km	MPC · JPL
555693	2014 DP_{27}	—	December 27, 2006	Mount Lemmon	Mount Lemmon Survey	V	650 m	MPC · JPL
555694	2014 DQ_{28}	—	December 1, 2006	Kitt Peak	Spacewatch	·	600 m	MPC · JPL
555695	2014 DW_{29}	—	August 9, 2005	Cerro Tololo	Deep Ecliptic Survey	·	690 m	MPC · JPL
555696	2014 DZ_{29}	—	January 29, 2014	Kitt Peak	Spacewatch	·	2.4 km	MPC · JPL
555697	2014 DP_{35}	—	January 17, 2007	Kitt Peak	Spacewatch	·	550 m	MPC · JPL
555698	2014 DS_{35}	—	February 22, 2014	Kitt Peak	Spacewatch	·	850 m	MPC · JPL
555699	2014 DV_{37}	—	January 16, 2008	Kitt Peak	Spacewatch	VER	3.0 km	MPC · JPL
555700	2014 DF_{41}	—	February 9, 2014	Kitt Peak	Spacewatch	·	800 m	MPC · JPL

== 555701–555800 ==
back to top

Designation			Discovery			Properties		Ref
Permanent	Provisional	Named after	Date	Site	Discoverer(s)	Category	Diam.	Ref
555701	2014 DL_{41}	—	December 27, 2006	Mount Lemmon	Mount Lemmon Survey	·	550 m	MPC · JPL
555702	2014 DQ_{42}	—	September 6, 2008	Mount Lemmon	Mount Lemmon Survey	·	730 m	MPC · JPL
555703	2014 DJ_{44}	—	January 24, 2007	Mount Lemmon	Mount Lemmon Survey	·	670 m	MPC · JPL
555704	2014 DW_{46}	—	December 20, 2004	Mount Lemmon	Mount Lemmon Survey	·	1.4 km	MPC · JPL
555705	2014 DP_{48}	—	March 25, 2003	Anderson Mesa	LONEOS	V	830 m	MPC · JPL
555706	2014 DA_{52}	—	February 26, 2014	Haleakala	Pan-STARRS 1	·	650 m	MPC · JPL
555707	2014 DG_{52}	—	May 24, 2011	Mount Lemmon	Mount Lemmon Survey	·	620 m	MPC · JPL
555708	2014 DP_{52}	—	January 17, 2007	Kitt Peak	Spacewatch	·	560 m	MPC · JPL
555709	2014 DW_{54}	—	November 11, 2009	Kitt Peak	Spacewatch	·	470 m	MPC · JPL
555710	2014 DR_{55}	—	January 28, 2007	Kitt Peak	Spacewatch	·	770 m	MPC · JPL
555711	2014 DH_{59}	—	December 5, 2002	Socorro	LINEAR	·	750 m	MPC · JPL
555712	2014 DR_{61}	—	November 12, 2012	Mount Lemmon	Mount Lemmon Survey	·	770 m	MPC · JPL
555713	2014 DP_{65}	—	October 26, 2005	Kitt Peak	Spacewatch	·	990 m	MPC · JPL
555714	2014 DJ_{69}	—	February 26, 2014	Haleakala	Pan-STARRS 1	·	940 m	MPC · JPL
555715	2014 DR_{69}	—	February 26, 2014	Haleakala	Pan-STARRS 1	·	820 m	MPC · JPL
555716	2014 DU_{70}	—	March 10, 2007	Kitt Peak	Spacewatch	·	690 m	MPC · JPL
555717	2014 DC_{72}	—	March 11, 2007	Kitt Peak	Spacewatch	·	640 m	MPC · JPL
555718	2014 DN_{73}	—	February 26, 2014	Haleakala	Pan-STARRS 1	·	690 m	MPC · JPL
555719	2014 DV_{73}	—	May 24, 2011	Mount Lemmon	Mount Lemmon Survey	·	630 m	MPC · JPL
555720	2014 DG_{74}	—	February 10, 2014	Haleakala	Pan-STARRS 1	PHO	890 m	MPC · JPL
555721	2014 DK_{74}	—	May 24, 2011	Mount Lemmon	Mount Lemmon Survey	·	620 m	MPC · JPL
555722	2014 DS_{75}	—	October 25, 2001	Apache Point	SDSS Collaboration	·	950 m	MPC · JPL
555723	2014 DO_{76}	—	February 26, 2014	Haleakala	Pan-STARRS 1	·	640 m	MPC · JPL
555724	2014 DX_{76}	—	September 22, 1995	Kitt Peak	Spacewatch	·	510 m	MPC · JPL
555725	2014 DG_{78}	—	February 4, 2014	Mount Lemmon	Mount Lemmon Survey	PHO	890 m	MPC · JPL
555726	2014 DO_{79}	—	February 26, 2014	Haleakala	Pan-STARRS 1	PHO	630 m	MPC · JPL
555727	2014 DL_{82}	—	February 25, 2007	Kitt Peak	Spacewatch	·	700 m	MPC · JPL
555728	2014 DQ_{82}	—	February 22, 2014	Mount Lemmon	Mount Lemmon Survey	·	520 m	MPC · JPL
555729	2014 DT_{86}	—	January 10, 2007	Kitt Peak	Spacewatch	·	590 m	MPC · JPL
555730	2014 DG_{87}	—	February 9, 2014	Haleakala	Pan-STARRS 1	·	510 m	MPC · JPL
555731	2014 DJ_{87}	—	January 12, 2008	Mount Lemmon	Mount Lemmon Survey	·	2.9 km	MPC · JPL
555732	2014 DJ_{90}	—	August 26, 2012	Haleakala	Pan-STARRS 1	·	600 m	MPC · JPL
555733	2014 DV_{93}	—	February 26, 2014	Haleakala	Pan-STARRS 1	THM	2.2 km	MPC · JPL
555734	2014 DC_{95}	—	October 24, 2009	Kitt Peak	Spacewatch	·	560 m	MPC · JPL
555735	2014 DJ_{95}	—	December 20, 2009	Mount Lemmon	Mount Lemmon Survey	·	820 m	MPC · JPL
555736	2014 DJ_{98}	—	September 18, 2009	Mount Lemmon	Mount Lemmon Survey	·	590 m	MPC · JPL
555737	2014 DQ_{100}	—	January 28, 2014	Kitt Peak	Spacewatch	·	570 m	MPC · JPL
555738	2014 DV_{100}	—	March 11, 2003	Palomar	NEAT	·	3.4 km	MPC · JPL
555739	2014 DZ_{100}	—	April 13, 2011	Kitt Peak	Spacewatch	·	550 m	MPC · JPL
555740	2014 DY_{102}	—	January 10, 2014	Mount Lemmon	Mount Lemmon Survey	·	2.6 km	MPC · JPL
555741	2014 DM_{108}	—	August 10, 2012	Kitt Peak	Spacewatch	(883)	620 m	MPC · JPL
555742	2014 DC_{109}	—	May 3, 2008	Mount Lemmon	Mount Lemmon Survey	·	490 m	MPC · JPL
555743	2014 DH_{110}	—	March 16, 2007	Mount Lemmon	Mount Lemmon Survey	·	570 m	MPC · JPL
555744	2014 DT_{113}	—	October 12, 2005	Kitt Peak	Spacewatch	·	1.1 km	MPC · JPL
555745	2014 DD_{116}	—	February 26, 2014	Haleakala	Pan-STARRS 1	HYG	2.3 km	MPC · JPL
555746	2014 DA_{121}	—	October 18, 2001	Palomar	NEAT	·	3.0 km	MPC · JPL
555747	2014 DT_{124}	—	September 16, 2009	Mount Lemmon	Mount Lemmon Survey	·	630 m	MPC · JPL
555748	2014 DX_{127}	—	August 19, 2001	Cerro Tololo	Deep Ecliptic Survey	·	560 m	MPC · JPL
555749	2014 DQ_{129}	—	December 6, 2012	Mount Lemmon	Mount Lemmon Survey	·	660 m	MPC · JPL
555750	2014 DF_{132}	—	August 23, 2004	Kitt Peak	Spacewatch	·	3.6 km	MPC · JPL
555751	2014 DR_{133}	—	February 22, 2014	Kitt Peak	Spacewatch	·	530 m	MPC · JPL
555752	2014 DV_{133}	—	December 16, 2006	Mount Lemmon	Mount Lemmon Survey	·	590 m	MPC · JPL
555753	2014 DM_{138}	—	February 22, 2014	Kitt Peak	Spacewatch	·	730 m	MPC · JPL
555754	2014 DN_{139}	—	December 21, 2006	Mount Lemmon	Mount Lemmon Survey	·	550 m	MPC · JPL
555755	2014 DM_{142}	—	December 18, 2006	Socorro	LINEAR	·	710 m	MPC · JPL
555756	2014 DH_{143}	—	February 26, 2014	Haleakala	Pan-STARRS 1	res · 3:4	161 km	MPC · JPL
555757	2014 DM_{143}	—	February 26, 2014	Haleakala	Pan-STARRS 1	cubewano (hot)	347 km	MPC · JPL
555758	2014 DP_{143}	—	February 25, 2014	Haleakala	Pan-STARRS 1	plutino	147 km	MPC · JPL
555759	2014 DR_{146}	—	February 26, 2014	Haleakala	Pan-STARRS 1	·	550 m	MPC · JPL
555760	2014 DD_{148}	—	November 7, 2008	Mount Lemmon	Mount Lemmon Survey	·	1.4 km	MPC · JPL
555761	2014 DX_{148}	—	October 14, 2012	Mount Lemmon	Mount Lemmon Survey	V	540 m	MPC · JPL
555762	2014 DC_{153}	—	September 7, 2008	Mount Lemmon	Mount Lemmon Survey	·	1.2 km	MPC · JPL
555763	2014 DJ_{153}	—	October 17, 2012	Haleakala	Pan-STARRS 1	V	520 m	MPC · JPL
555764	2014 DK_{153}	—	October 11, 2005	Kitt Peak	Spacewatch	·	690 m	MPC · JPL
555765	2014 DW_{154}	—	December 1, 2005	Kitt Peak	Spacewatch	·	750 m	MPC · JPL
555766	2014 DK_{155}	—	February 26, 2014	Haleakala	Pan-STARRS 1	·	590 m	MPC · JPL
555767	2014 DB_{157}	—	February 27, 2014	Haleakala	Pan-STARRS 1	·	1.1 km	MPC · JPL
555768	2014 DK_{157}	—	July 4, 2016	Haleakala	Pan-STARRS 1	·	3.7 km	MPC · JPL
555769	2014 DA_{163}	—	February 27, 2014	Haleakala	Pan-STARRS 1	·	1.5 km	MPC · JPL
555770	2014 DN_{167}	—	August 26, 2012	Haleakala	Pan-STARRS 1	·	530 m	MPC · JPL
555771	2014 DQ_{167}	—	November 23, 2009	Kitt Peak	Spacewatch	·	520 m	MPC · JPL
555772	2014 DS_{167}	—	April 1, 2003	Apache Point	SDSS Collaboration	·	2.7 km	MPC · JPL
555773	2014 DR_{169}	—	February 18, 2014	Mount Lemmon	Mount Lemmon Survey	·	620 m	MPC · JPL
555774	2014 DX_{170}	—	February 26, 2014	Haleakala	Pan-STARRS 1	·	500 m	MPC · JPL
555775	2014 DH_{174}	—	February 26, 2014	Haleakala	Pan-STARRS 1	·	3.7 km	MPC · JPL
555776	2014 DR_{178}	—	October 19, 2003	Kitt Peak	Spacewatch	·	1.5 km	MPC · JPL
555777	2014 DC_{179}	—	February 26, 2014	Mount Lemmon	Mount Lemmon Survey	·	1.0 km	MPC · JPL
555778	2014 DZ_{180}	—	March 23, 2003	Apache Point	SDSS Collaboration	·	810 m	MPC · JPL
555779	2014 DW_{181}	—	February 25, 2014	Haleakala	Pan-STARRS 1	PHO	940 m	MPC · JPL
555780	2014 DY_{181}	—	February 28, 2014	Haleakala	Pan-STARRS 1	·	590 m	MPC · JPL
555781	2014 EW	—	January 7, 2014	Kitt Peak	Spacewatch	·	2.4 km	MPC · JPL
555782	2014 EF_{3}	—	February 21, 2007	Kitt Peak	Spacewatch	·	520 m	MPC · JPL
555783	2014 EG_{3}	—	January 28, 2007	Kitt Peak	Spacewatch	·	700 m	MPC · JPL
555784	2014 EN_{3}	—	March 5, 2014	Haleakala	Pan-STARRS 1	·	630 m	MPC · JPL
555785	2014 ER_{4}	—	January 27, 2007	Kitt Peak	Spacewatch	·	580 m	MPC · JPL
555786	2014 EP_{6}	—	February 14, 2000	Kitt Peak	Spacewatch	·	630 m	MPC · JPL
555787	2014 EZ_{6}	—	February 28, 2014	Haleakala	Pan-STARRS 1	·	630 m	MPC · JPL
555788	2014 EG_{7}	—	February 27, 2007	Kitt Peak	Spacewatch	·	1.0 km	MPC · JPL
555789	2014 EG_{10}	—	December 14, 2013	Haleakala	Pan-STARRS 1	PHO	960 m	MPC · JPL
555790	2014 ED_{16}	—	May 10, 2004	Kitt Peak	Spacewatch	·	650 m	MPC · JPL
555791	2014 EE_{16}	—	September 3, 2008	La Sagra	OAM	·	910 m	MPC · JPL
555792	2014 EL_{16}	—	May 24, 2011	Mount Lemmon	Mount Lemmon Survey	·	590 m	MPC · JPL
555793	2014 EA_{18}	—	April 16, 2004	Kitt Peak	Spacewatch	·	880 m	MPC · JPL
555794	2014 EY_{19}	—	April 2, 2011	Kitt Peak	Spacewatch	·	660 m	MPC · JPL
555795	2014 EX_{20}	—	February 18, 2010	Mount Lemmon	Mount Lemmon Survey	NYS	1.0 km	MPC · JPL
555796	2014 EQ_{22}	—	February 21, 2007	Mount Lemmon	Mount Lemmon Survey	·	610 m	MPC · JPL
555797	2014 EO_{23}	—	December 14, 2013	Haleakala	Pan-STARRS 1	PHO	1.0 km	MPC · JPL
555798	2014 EV_{26}	—	February 9, 2008	Kitt Peak	Spacewatch	(1298)	2.5 km	MPC · JPL
555799	2014 EU_{27}	—	November 19, 2009	Kitt Peak	Spacewatch	·	800 m	MPC · JPL
555800	2014 EL_{30}	—	March 16, 2007	Catalina	CSS	·	800 m	MPC · JPL

== 555801–555900 ==
back to top

Designation			Discovery			Properties		Ref
Permanent	Provisional	Named after	Date	Site	Discoverer(s)	Category	Diam.	Ref
555801	2014 ER_{31}	—	March 20, 2002	Kitt Peak	Deep Ecliptic Survey	VER	2.7 km	MPC · JPL
555802 Chengyen	2014 EH_{32}	Chengyen	June 6, 2007	Lulin	C.-S. Lin, Q. Ye	NYS	1.2 km	MPC · JPL
555803	2014 ES_{32}	—	September 22, 2008	Kitt Peak	Spacewatch	·	650 m	MPC · JPL
555804	2014 ED_{35}	—	January 26, 2007	Kitt Peak	Spacewatch	·	860 m	MPC · JPL
555805	2014 ET_{35}	—	October 7, 2008	Kitt Peak	Spacewatch	·	770 m	MPC · JPL
555806	2014 EG_{36}	—	November 22, 2005	Kitt Peak	Spacewatch	·	750 m	MPC · JPL
555807	2014 EY_{36}	—	January 31, 2013	Kitt Peak	Spacewatch	3:2	6.3 km	MPC · JPL
555808	2014 EC_{38}	—	March 8, 2014	Mount Lemmon	Mount Lemmon Survey	·	1.7 km	MPC · JPL
555809	2014 EQ_{38}	—	February 26, 2014	Haleakala	Pan-STARRS 1	·	670 m	MPC · JPL
555810	2014 EV_{38}	—	March 8, 2014	Mount Lemmon	Mount Lemmon Survey	·	650 m	MPC · JPL
555811	2014 EJ_{42}	—	November 16, 2009	Kitt Peak	Spacewatch	V	650 m	MPC · JPL
555812	2014 EL_{42}	—	August 10, 2010	XuYi	PMO NEO Survey Program	T_{j} (2.99)	3.4 km	MPC · JPL
555813	2014 ES_{44}	—	February 11, 2014	Mount Lemmon	Mount Lemmon Survey	·	650 m	MPC · JPL
555814	2014 EM_{45}	—	January 24, 2007	Anderson Mesa	LONEOS	PHO	820 m	MPC · JPL
555815	2014 ET_{46}	—	April 22, 2011	Kitt Peak	Spacewatch	·	840 m	MPC · JPL
555816 Danielposey	2014 EV_{46}	Danielposey	August 10, 2005	Mauna Kea	P. A. Wiegert, D. D. Balam	·	910 m	MPC · JPL
555817	2014 EU_{50}	—	August 31, 2009	Siding Spring	SSS	PHO	1.1 km	MPC · JPL
555818	2014 EE_{51}	—	September 19, 1998	Apache Point	SDSS Collaboration	PHO	780 m	MPC · JPL
555819	2014 EJ_{51}	—	March 11, 2014	Mount Lemmon	Mount Lemmon Survey	·	1.0 km	MPC · JPL
555820	2014 EA_{52}	—	March 9, 2014	Haleakala	Pan-STARRS 1	cubewano (hot)	399 km	MPC · JPL
555821	2014 ED_{67}	—	January 24, 2007	Mount Lemmon	Mount Lemmon Survey	·	3.3 km	MPC · JPL
555822	2014 EH_{70}	—	January 29, 2007	Kitt Peak	Spacewatch	·	860 m	MPC · JPL
555823	2014 ER_{82}	—	November 14, 2012	Mount Lemmon	Mount Lemmon Survey	·	1.4 km	MPC · JPL
555824	2014 EY_{87}	—	September 2, 2011	Haleakala	Pan-STARRS 1	·	1.7 km	MPC · JPL
555825	2014 EK_{93}	—	October 11, 2012	Haleakala	Pan-STARRS 1	V	480 m	MPC · JPL
555826	2014 EY_{93}	—	February 28, 2014	Haleakala	Pan-STARRS 1	V	510 m	MPC · JPL
555827	2014 ED_{97}	—	October 19, 2012	Haleakala	Pan-STARRS 1	·	1.1 km	MPC · JPL
555828	2014 EA_{116}	—	July 4, 2016	Haleakala	Pan-STARRS 1	·	2.9 km	MPC · JPL
555829	2014 EO_{134}	—	September 5, 2008	Kitt Peak	Spacewatch	·	680 m	MPC · JPL
555830	2014 EU_{142}	—	September 16, 2012	Mount Lemmon	Mount Lemmon Survey	·	500 m	MPC · JPL
555831	2014 ET_{145}	—	December 29, 2005	Mount Lemmon	Mount Lemmon Survey	·	1.0 km	MPC · JPL
555832	2014 EZ_{146}	—	August 30, 2005	Kitt Peak	Spacewatch	·	630 m	MPC · JPL
555833	2014 EP_{181}	—	November 9, 1999	Socorro	LINEAR	·	640 m	MPC · JPL
555834	2014 ET_{182}	—	February 14, 2010	Mount Lemmon	Mount Lemmon Survey	·	880 m	MPC · JPL
555835	2014 EL_{189}	—	January 29, 2014	Kitt Peak	Spacewatch	·	540 m	MPC · JPL
555836	2014 EQ_{189}	—	September 17, 2006	Kitt Peak	Spacewatch	·	2.3 km	MPC · JPL
555837	2014 EA_{193}	—	October 11, 2009	Mount Lemmon	Mount Lemmon Survey	·	620 m	MPC · JPL
555838	2014 EY_{193}	—	May 24, 2011	Mount Lemmon	Mount Lemmon Survey	·	750 m	MPC · JPL
555839	2014 EQ_{207}	—	April 23, 2015	Haleakala	Pan-STARRS 1	EOS	1.3 km	MPC · JPL
555840	2014 EX_{217}	—	September 30, 2005	Mount Lemmon	Mount Lemmon Survey	·	700 m	MPC · JPL
555841	2014 EX_{227}	—	May 20, 2015	Mount Lemmon	Mount Lemmon Survey	·	2.8 km	MPC · JPL
555842	2014 EQ_{241}	—	September 24, 2011	Mount Lemmon	Mount Lemmon Survey	·	2.9 km	MPC · JPL
555843	2014 EU_{243}	—	September 6, 2008	Kitt Peak	Spacewatch	L4 · 006	7.2 km	MPC · JPL
555844	2014 EM_{249}	—	April 24, 2003	Kitt Peak	Spacewatch	·	2.8 km	MPC · JPL
555845	2014 EJ_{251}	—	March 8, 2014	Mount Lemmon	Mount Lemmon Survey	TIR	2.2 km	MPC · JPL
555846	2014 ET_{252}	—	March 7, 2014	Mount Lemmon	Mount Lemmon Survey	·	1.0 km	MPC · JPL
555847	2014 FP_{3}	—	February 28, 2014	Mount Lemmon	Mount Lemmon Survey	·	1.1 km	MPC · JPL
555848	2014 FM_{4}	—	July 28, 2008	Mount Lemmon	Mount Lemmon Survey	PHO	930 m	MPC · JPL
555849	2014 FZ_{12}	—	January 28, 2003	Palomar	NEAT	·	1.4 km	MPC · JPL
555850	2014 FA_{17}	—	February 26, 2014	Haleakala	Pan-STARRS 1	·	570 m	MPC · JPL
555851	2014 FN_{17}	—	May 22, 2001	Cerro Tololo	Deep Ecliptic Survey	NYS	1.2 km	MPC · JPL
555852	2014 FU_{21}	—	July 29, 2008	Mount Lemmon	Mount Lemmon Survey	·	690 m	MPC · JPL
555853	2014 FQ_{26}	—	April 18, 2009	Kitt Peak	Spacewatch	·	2.6 km	MPC · JPL
555854	2014 FG_{29}	—	February 17, 2007	Mount Lemmon	Mount Lemmon Survey	·	880 m	MPC · JPL
555855	2014 FB_{32}	—	December 4, 2012	Mount Lemmon	Mount Lemmon Survey	·	780 m	MPC · JPL
555856	2014 FP_{32}	—	November 20, 2009	Kitt Peak	Spacewatch	·	960 m	MPC · JPL
555857	2014 FM_{39}	—	November 1, 2005	Mount Lemmon	Mount Lemmon Survey	V	770 m	MPC · JPL
555858	2014 FP_{40}	—	February 27, 2014	Catalina	CSS	·	1.0 km	MPC · JPL
555859	2014 FX_{40}	—	October 18, 2012	Haleakala	Pan-STARRS 1	·	800 m	MPC · JPL
555860	2014 FA_{43}	—	March 28, 2014	Mount Lemmon	Mount Lemmon Survey	·	560 m	MPC · JPL
555861	2014 FX_{46}	—	February 22, 2007	Kitt Peak	Spacewatch	·	530 m	MPC · JPL
555862	2014 FZ_{46}	—	March 29, 2014	Mount Lemmon	Mount Lemmon Survey	·	2.6 km	MPC · JPL
555863	2014 FS_{49}	—	March 12, 2014	Haleakala	Pan-STARRS 1	PHO	920 m	MPC · JPL
555864	2014 FO_{54}	—	February 8, 2002	Kitt Peak	Deep Ecliptic Survey	·	3.1 km	MPC · JPL
555865	2014 FO_{55}	—	March 23, 2003	Apache Point	SDSS Collaboration	·	890 m	MPC · JPL
555866	2014 FX_{62}	—	October 22, 2012	Haleakala	Pan-STARRS 1	·	810 m	MPC · JPL
555867	2014 FP_{63}	—	November 23, 2009	Mount Lemmon	Mount Lemmon Survey	·	1.1 km	MPC · JPL
555868	2014 FN_{65}	—	August 6, 2008	Eygalayes	Sogorb, P.	·	630 m	MPC · JPL
555869	2014 FK_{75}	—	October 21, 2012	Haleakala	Pan-STARRS 1	·	950 m	MPC · JPL
555870	2014 FG_{76}	—	September 3, 2008	Kitt Peak	Spacewatch	·	850 m	MPC · JPL
555871	2014 FQ_{76}	—	March 24, 2014	Haleakala	Pan-STARRS 1	·	990 m	MPC · JPL
555872	2014 FE_{85}	—	November 17, 2009	Mount Lemmon	Mount Lemmon Survey	·	860 m	MPC · JPL
555873	2014 GV_{2}	—	March 26, 2007	Mount Lemmon	Mount Lemmon Survey	·	880 m	MPC · JPL
555874	2014 GB_{4}	—	January 10, 2013	Haleakala	Pan-STARRS 1	·	3.3 km	MPC · JPL
555875	2014 GW_{5}	—	November 4, 2012	Mount Lemmon	Mount Lemmon Survey	·	580 m	MPC · JPL
555876	2014 GY_{5}	—	February 28, 2014	Haleakala	Pan-STARRS 1	·	610 m	MPC · JPL
555877	2014 GR_{7}	—	September 3, 2008	Kitt Peak	Spacewatch	·	1.0 km	MPC · JPL
555878	2014 GT_{8}	—	May 6, 2011	Kitt Peak	Spacewatch	·	560 m	MPC · JPL
555879	2014 GX_{8}	—	January 29, 2014	Mount Lemmon	Mount Lemmon Survey	·	620 m	MPC · JPL
555880	2014 GV_{9}	—	February 28, 2014	Haleakala	Pan-STARRS 1	·	730 m	MPC · JPL
555881	2014 GG_{10}	—	March 14, 2007	Kitt Peak	Spacewatch	·	740 m	MPC · JPL
555882	2014 GH_{11}	—	March 9, 2003	Anderson Mesa	LONEOS	V	770 m	MPC · JPL
555883	2014 GE_{12}	—	April 24, 2003	Kitt Peak	Spacewatch	NYS	1.2 km	MPC · JPL
555884	2014 GL_{12}	—	February 28, 2014	Haleakala	Pan-STARRS 1	PHO	690 m	MPC · JPL
555885	2014 GS_{12}	—	October 20, 2008	Mount Lemmon	Mount Lemmon Survey	V	570 m	MPC · JPL
555886	2014 GC_{13}	—	November 5, 2005	Kitt Peak	Spacewatch	·	670 m	MPC · JPL
555887	2014 GQ_{13}	—	March 26, 2007	Kitt Peak	Spacewatch	V	560 m	MPC · JPL
555888	2014 GT_{13}	—	November 22, 2005	Kitt Peak	Spacewatch	·	790 m	MPC · JPL
555889	2014 GZ_{13}	—	April 8, 2003	Kitt Peak	Spacewatch	NYS	980 m	MPC · JPL
555890	2014 GB_{15}	—	March 11, 2003	Palomar	NEAT	V	930 m	MPC · JPL
555891	2014 GR_{15}	—	October 2, 2008	Mount Lemmon	Mount Lemmon Survey	V	600 m	MPC · JPL
555892	2014 GE_{16}	—	March 7, 2003	Palomar	NEAT	·	1.3 km	MPC · JPL
555893	2014 GS_{16}	—	March 25, 2014	Kitt Peak	Spacewatch	·	1.2 km	MPC · JPL
555894	2014 GU_{16}	—	March 7, 2003	St. Véran	St. Veran	·	1.1 km	MPC · JPL
555895	2014 GX_{20}	—	August 26, 2012	Haleakala	Pan-STARRS 1	·	680 m	MPC · JPL
555896	2014 GD_{25}	—	December 12, 2012	Mount Lemmon	Mount Lemmon Survey	VER	2.3 km	MPC · JPL
555897	2014 GA_{27}	—	March 24, 2014	Haleakala	Pan-STARRS 1	·	950 m	MPC · JPL
555898	2014 GF_{27}	—	November 12, 2001	Apache Point	SDSS Collaboration	·	1.2 km	MPC · JPL
555899	2014 GY_{27}	—	October 2, 2008	Mount Lemmon	Mount Lemmon Survey	·	600 m	MPC · JPL
555900	2014 GQ_{29}	—	November 2, 2012	Mount Lemmon	Mount Lemmon Survey	·	950 m	MPC · JPL

== 555901–556000 ==
back to top

Designation			Discovery			Properties		Ref
Permanent	Provisional	Named after	Date	Site	Discoverer(s)	Category	Diam.	Ref
555901	2014 GR_{29}	—	September 21, 2011	Catalina	CSS	·	990 m	MPC · JPL
555902	2014 GS_{30}	—	April 8, 2003	Kitt Peak	Spacewatch	·	780 m	MPC · JPL
555903	2014 GN_{32}	—	October 9, 2012	Mount Lemmon	Mount Lemmon Survey	PHO	850 m	MPC · JPL
555904	2014 GU_{32}	—	June 22, 2004	Kitt Peak	Spacewatch	·	780 m	MPC · JPL
555905	2014 GV_{33}	—	March 27, 2014	Haleakala	Pan-STARRS 1	·	1.1 km	MPC · JPL
555906	2014 GD_{37}	—	March 9, 2014	Haleakala	Pan-STARRS 1	·	770 m	MPC · JPL
555907	2014 GK_{40}	—	December 20, 2009	Mount Lemmon	Mount Lemmon Survey	·	1.3 km	MPC · JPL
555908	2014 GU_{40}	—	August 20, 2004	Kitt Peak	Spacewatch	·	3.3 km	MPC · JPL
555909	2014 GT_{41}	—	April 5, 2014	Haleakala	Pan-STARRS 1	·	800 m	MPC · JPL
555910	2014 GV_{44}	—	February 26, 2000	Socorro	LINEAR	·	840 m	MPC · JPL
555911	2014 GR_{50}	—	March 24, 2014	Haleakala	Pan-STARRS 1	·	650 m	MPC · JPL
555912	2014 GX_{50}	—	December 23, 2012	Haleakala	Pan-STARRS 1	BRA	1.5 km	MPC · JPL
555913	2014 GK_{52}	—	October 23, 2012	Haleakala	Pan-STARRS 1	V	480 m	MPC · JPL
555914	2014 GT_{52}	—	December 15, 2009	Catalina	CSS	PHO	850 m	MPC · JPL
555915	2014 GX_{53}	—	April 12, 2002	Palomar	NEAT	res · 7:11	320 km	MPC · JPL
555916	2014 GB_{54}	—	April 4, 2014	Haleakala	Pan-STARRS 1	plutino	136 km	MPC · JPL
555917	2014 GJ_{58}	—	April 7, 2014	Mount Lemmon	Mount Lemmon Survey	·	1.1 km	MPC · JPL
555918	2014 GO_{59}	—	March 11, 2003	Kitt Peak	Spacewatch	·	1.0 km	MPC · JPL
555919	2014 GL_{61}	—	April 5, 2014	Haleakala	Pan-STARRS 1	·	1.3 km	MPC · JPL
555920	2014 GF_{65}	—	April 5, 2014	Haleakala	Pan-STARRS 1	·	670 m	MPC · JPL
555921	2014 GM_{65}	—	August 14, 2016	Haleakala	Pan-STARRS 1	·	2.9 km	MPC · JPL
555922	2014 GQ_{67}	—	April 4, 2014	Haleakala	Pan-STARRS 1	·	750 m	MPC · JPL
555923	2014 GB_{70}	—	April 10, 2014	Haleakala	Pan-STARRS 1	·	1.1 km	MPC · JPL
555924	2014 GW_{79}	—	April 5, 2014	Haleakala	Pan-STARRS 1	KOR	1.0 km	MPC · JPL
555925	2014 GS_{81}	—	April 1, 2014	Mount Lemmon	Mount Lemmon Survey	·	1 km	MPC · JPL
555926	2014 HE_{1}	—	February 26, 2014	Mount Lemmon	Mount Lemmon Survey	·	680 m	MPC · JPL
555927	2014 HT_{1}	—	April 21, 2014	Elena Remote	Oreshko, A.	·	830 m	MPC · JPL
555928	2014 HZ_{3}	—	January 7, 2010	Kitt Peak	Spacewatch	·	600 m	MPC · JPL
555929	2014 HC_{4}	—	August 3, 2011	Cerro Burek	Burek, Cerro	·	1.6 km	MPC · JPL
555930	2014 HA_{5}	—	October 22, 2011	Kitt Peak	Spacewatch	·	950 m	MPC · JPL
555931	2014 HJ_{5}	—	March 15, 2007	Kitt Peak	Spacewatch	·	830 m	MPC · JPL
555932	2014 HY_{5}	—	August 24, 2011	Haleakala	Pan-STARRS 1	·	990 m	MPC · JPL
555933	2014 HC_{6}	—	December 23, 2006	Mount Lemmon	Mount Lemmon Survey	·	650 m	MPC · JPL
555934	2014 HB_{9}	—	February 25, 2007	Mount Lemmon	Mount Lemmon Survey	·	570 m	MPC · JPL
555935	2014 HH_{18}	—	April 4, 2014	Haleakala	Pan-STARRS 1	·	720 m	MPC · JPL
555936	2014 HE_{19}	—	April 21, 2014	Mount Lemmon	Mount Lemmon Survey	·	820 m	MPC · JPL
555937	2014 HJ_{19}	—	October 15, 2004	Mount Lemmon	Mount Lemmon Survey	·	1.3 km	MPC · JPL
555938	2014 HR_{21}	—	August 30, 2011	Haleakala	Pan-STARRS 1	V	570 m	MPC · JPL
555939	2014 HS_{21}	—	September 12, 2004	Kitt Peak	Spacewatch	·	790 m	MPC · JPL
555940	2014 HN_{28}	—	May 5, 2010	Mount Lemmon	Mount Lemmon Survey	·	1.0 km	MPC · JPL
555941	2014 HE_{32}	—	April 19, 2007	Kitt Peak	Spacewatch	·	750 m	MPC · JPL
555942	2014 HH_{36}	—	April 1, 2014	Mount Lemmon	Mount Lemmon Survey	V	580 m	MPC · JPL
555943	2014 HS_{43}	—	December 18, 2001	Socorro	LINEAR	·	1.2 km	MPC · JPL
555944	2014 HW_{43}	—	February 14, 2010	Mount Lemmon	Mount Lemmon Survey	·	1.1 km	MPC · JPL
555945	2014 HQ_{45}	—	April 1, 2003	Apache Point	SDSS Collaboration	V	830 m	MPC · JPL
555946	2014 HC_{46}	—	April 24, 2014	Mount Lemmon	Mount Lemmon Survey	·	890 m	MPC · JPL
555947	2014 HC_{47}	—	April 20, 2014	Mount Lemmon	Mount Lemmon Survey	·	630 m	MPC · JPL
555948	2014 HO_{51}	—	November 26, 2005	Kitt Peak	Spacewatch	·	660 m	MPC · JPL
555949	2014 HL_{56}	—	February 28, 2008	Kitt Peak	Spacewatch	·	2.4 km	MPC · JPL
555950	2014 HR_{56}	—	September 11, 2005	Kitt Peak	Spacewatch	·	550 m	MPC · JPL
555951	2014 HP_{61}	—	April 23, 2014	Cerro Tololo-DECam	DECam	KOR	920 m	MPC · JPL
555952	2014 HG_{65}	—	April 23, 2014	Cerro Tololo-DECam	DECam	·	850 m	MPC · JPL
555953	2014 HC_{69}	—	March 23, 2003	Apache Point	SDSS Collaboration	·	920 m	MPC · JPL
555954	2014 HP_{69}	—	April 23, 2014	Cerro Tololo-DECam	DECam	·	970 m	MPC · JPL
555955 Lurçat	2014 HB_{70}	Lurçat	November 20, 2005	Nogales	J.-C. Merlin	MAS	490 m	MPC · JPL
555956	2014 HN_{81}	—	December 18, 2001	Kitt Peak	Spacewatch	·	640 m	MPC · JPL
555957	2014 HF_{83}	—	October 20, 2012	Mount Lemmon	Mount Lemmon Survey	·	750 m	MPC · JPL
555958	2014 HM_{83}	—	September 25, 2008	Kitt Peak	Spacewatch	·	750 m	MPC · JPL
555959	2014 HU_{100}	—	October 30, 2005	Catalina	CSS	·	520 m	MPC · JPL
555960	2014 HG_{102}	—	October 18, 2012	Haleakala	Pan-STARRS 1	·	480 m	MPC · JPL
555961	2014 HK_{106}	—	December 4, 2008	Kitt Peak	Spacewatch	·	1.3 km	MPC · JPL
555962	2014 HZ_{106}	—	April 23, 2014	Cerro Tololo	DECam	·	1.2 km	MPC · JPL
555963	2014 HZ_{107}	—	April 24, 2014	Mount Lemmon	Mount Lemmon Survey	·	1.0 km	MPC · JPL
555964	2014 HD_{119}	—	April 23, 2014	Cerro Tololo	DECam	V	480 m	MPC · JPL
555965	2014 HY_{121}	—	March 27, 2003	Kitt Peak	Spacewatch	·	760 m	MPC · JPL
555966	2014 HD_{123}	—	February 28, 2014	Haleakala	Pan-STARRS 1	·	1.1 km	MPC · JPL
555967	2014 HN_{127}	—	November 3, 1999	Kitt Peak	Spacewatch	·	1.1 km	MPC · JPL
555968	2014 HH_{129}	—	October 27, 2005	Mount Lemmon	Mount Lemmon Survey	·	780 m	MPC · JPL
555969	2014 HW_{129}	—	April 23, 2014	Cerro Tololo-DECam	DECam	V	440 m	MPC · JPL
555970	2014 HA_{130}	—	April 4, 2003	Kitt Peak	Spacewatch	MAS	580 m	MPC · JPL
555971	2014 HR_{130}	—	April 22, 2007	Kitt Peak	Spacewatch	·	740 m	MPC · JPL
555972	2014 HX_{130}	—	February 10, 2002	Socorro	LINEAR	·	1.9 km	MPC · JPL
555973	2014 HL_{131}	—	December 3, 2012	Mount Lemmon	Mount Lemmon Survey	PHO	930 m	MPC · JPL
555974	2014 HQ_{131}	—	December 27, 2005	Kitt Peak	Spacewatch	V	610 m	MPC · JPL
555975	2014 HJ_{137}	—	April 23, 2014	Cerro Tololo-DECam	DECam	V	500 m	MPC · JPL
555976	2014 HJ_{139}	—	October 18, 2012	Haleakala	Pan-STARRS 1	·	670 m	MPC · JPL
555977	2014 HK_{140}	—	August 23, 2011	Haleakala	Pan-STARRS 1	·	850 m	MPC · JPL
555978	2014 HC_{143}	—	November 4, 2005	Mount Lemmon	Mount Lemmon Survey	·	660 m	MPC · JPL
555979	2014 HQ_{143}	—	February 9, 2007	Mount Lemmon	Mount Lemmon Survey	·	790 m	MPC · JPL
555980	2014 HT_{143}	—	March 13, 2007	Kitt Peak	Spacewatch	·	610 m	MPC · JPL
555981	2014 HQ_{144}	—	March 13, 2003	Kitt Peak	Spacewatch	·	1.0 km	MPC · JPL
555982	2014 HY_{144}	—	March 20, 2007	Kitt Peak	Spacewatch	·	680 m	MPC · JPL
555983	2014 HN_{145}	—	March 9, 2014	Haleakala	Pan-STARRS 1	·	700 m	MPC · JPL
555984	2014 HR_{145}	—	October 8, 2012	Haleakala	Pan-STARRS 1	V	640 m	MPC · JPL
555985	2014 HQ_{147}	—	February 19, 2010	Mount Lemmon	Mount Lemmon Survey	·	1.1 km	MPC · JPL
555986	2014 HZ_{151}	—	March 15, 2007	Mount Lemmon	Mount Lemmon Survey	·	630 m	MPC · JPL
555987	2014 HX_{153}	—	October 21, 2012	Haleakala	Pan-STARRS 1	·	860 m	MPC · JPL
555988	2014 HW_{155}	—	March 28, 2014	Kitt Peak	Spacewatch	NYS	880 m	MPC · JPL
555989	2014 HF_{158}	—	November 19, 2012	Kitt Peak	Spacewatch	·	820 m	MPC · JPL
555990	2014 HU_{162}	—	December 23, 2012	Haleakala	Pan-STARRS 1	·	1.1 km	MPC · JPL
555991	2014 HH_{164}	—	April 4, 2000	Anderson Mesa	LONEOS	·	750 m	MPC · JPL
555992	2014 HL_{167}	—	May 15, 2009	Mount Lemmon	Mount Lemmon Survey	·	1.4 km	MPC · JPL
555993	2014 HA_{173}	—	April 29, 2014	Haleakala	Pan-STARRS 1	V	530 m	MPC · JPL
555994	2014 HN_{179}	—	March 13, 2007	Kitt Peak	Spacewatch	·	580 m	MPC · JPL
555995	2014 HQ_{180}	—	April 29, 2014	Mount Lemmon	Mount Lemmon Survey	T_{j} (2.99)	3.7 km	MPC · JPL
555996	2014 HX_{182}	—	February 16, 2010	Mount Lemmon	Mount Lemmon Survey	MAS	690 m	MPC · JPL
555997	2014 HL_{183}	—	September 6, 2008	Kitt Peak	Spacewatch	3:2	4.5 km	MPC · JPL
555998	2014 HX_{184}	—	September 7, 2011	Kitt Peak	Spacewatch	NYS	920 m	MPC · JPL
555999	2014 HX_{185}	—	April 25, 2014	Mount Lemmon	Mount Lemmon Survey	V	590 m	MPC · JPL
556000	2014 HC_{186}	—	April 24, 2014	Mount Lemmon	Mount Lemmon Survey	·	660 m	MPC · JPL

back to top

== Meaning of names ==
As minor planet discoveries are confirmed, they are given a permanent number by the IAU's Minor Planet Center (MPC), and the discoverers can then submit names for them, following the IAU's naming conventions. The list below concerns those minor planets in the specified number-range that have received names, and explains the meanings of those names.

Official naming citations of newly named small Solar System bodies are approved and published in a bulletin by IAU's Working Group for Small Bodies Nomenclature (WGSBN). Before May 2021, citations were published in MPC's Minor Planet Circulars for many decades. Recent citations can also be found on the JPL Small-Body Database (SBDB). Until his death in 2016, German astronomer Lutz D. Schmadel compiled these citations into the Dictionary of Minor Planet Names (DMP) and regularly updated the collection.

Based on Paul Herget's The Names of the Minor Planets, Schmadel also researched the unclear origin of numerous asteroids, most of which had been named prior to World War II. This article incorporates text from this source, which is in the public domain: SBDB New namings may only be added to this list below after official publication as the preannouncement of names is condemned. The WGSBN publishes a comprehensive guideline for the naming rules of non-cometary small Solar System bodies.

Named minor planet	Provisional	This minor planet was named for...	Ref · Catalog
555092 Annasusanne	2013 QY_{47}	Anna Susanne Jahn (b. 1961) is the wife of the discoverer and a well-known German painter and printmaker in monotypes and watercolors.	IAU · 555092
555112 Monika	2013 QS_{96}	Monika Ponikiewska (born 1985) is the fiancée of the astronomer Michal Kusiak, who co-discovered this minor planet.	IAU · 555112
555120 Ottoguthier	2013 RW_{24}	Otto Guthier (b. 1953), a German oenologist and amateur astronomer.	IAU · 555120
555128 Birštonas	2013 RZ_{51}	Birštonas is a scenic resort and a spa town, population about 4000, in Lithuania. It is located 30 km south of Kaunas, on the right bank of the Nemunas River.	IAU · 555128
555152 Oproiu	2013 RV_{94}	Tiberiu Oproiu (1939–2020) was a Romanian researcher and professor at the Cluj-Napoca Astronomical Institute and University, respectively.	IAU · 555152
555227 Claraisabella	2013 TH_{90}	Clara Isabella Hormuth (2022 April 6) is the name of the stillborn daughter of the discoverer.	IAU · 555227
555292 Bakels	2013 UZ_{32}	Corrie Bakels (born 1942) is a Dutch archaeobotanist	IAU · 555292
555468 Tokarczuk	2013 YH_{47}	Olga Tokarczuk (born 1962) is a Polish writer and activist who was awarded the 2018 Nobel Prize in Literature. Her works presents pancultural insight into the eastern European region seen as a land, where large historical events interline with the life of ordinary people.	IAU · 555468
555802 Chengyen	2014 EH_{32}	Cheng Yen (b. 1937), founded the Tzu-Chi Foundation, a Taiwanese humanitarian organization involved in medical aid, disaster relief and environmental work.	IAU · 555802
555816 Danielposey	2014 EV_{46}	Daniel Posey, Canadian historian	IAU · 555816
555955 Lurçat	2014 HB_{70}	Jean Lurçat (1892–1966), a French painter, ceramist and designer of tapestry	IAU · 555955
