= List of archaeologists =

This is a list of archaeologists – people who study or practise archaeology, the study of the human past through material remains.

== A ==
- Charles Conrad Abbott (1843–1919) American; advocate of early occupation of Americas
- Kamyar Abdi (born 1969) Iranian; Iran, Neolithic to the Bronze Age
- Aziz Ab'Saber (1924–2012) Brazilian; Brazil
- Johann Michael Ackner (1783–1862) Transylvanian; Roman Dacia
- Dinu Adameșteanu (1913–2004) Romanian-Italian; aerial photography, survey of sites
- James M. Adovasio (born 1944) U.S.; New World (esp. Pre-Clovis), perishable technologies
- Anagnostis Agelarakis (born 1956) Greek; archaeological and physical anthropology
- Yohanan Aharoni (1919–1976) Israeli; Israel Bronze Age
- Julius Ailio (1872–1933) Finnish; Karelian Isthmus
- Ekrem Akurgal (1911–2002) Turkish; Anatolia
- Jorge de Alarcão (born 1934) Portuguese; Roman Portugal
- Umberto Albarella (born 19??) Italian-British; zooarchaeology
- William F. Albright (1891–1971) U.S.; Orientalist
- Leslie Alcock (1925–2006) English; Dark Age Britain
- Susan E. Alcock (born 1961?) American;Greece, Roman provinces
- Miranda Aldhouse-Green (born 1947) British; British Iron Age and Romano-Celtic
- Abbas Alizadeh (born 1951) Iranian; Iran
- Jim Allen, (1938–2005) Australian; Australia, South Pacific, Port Essington, Lapita, Polynesian
- Penelope Allison (born 1954) household and Roman archaeology
- Sedat Alp (1913–2006) Turkish; Hittitology
- Ruth Amiran (1915–2005) Israeli; Tel Arad
- George El Andary (born 1958) Lebanese; site restoration
- Atholl Anderson (born 1943) New Zealand; New Zealand and the Pacific
- David G. Anderson (born 1949) U.S.; eastern North America
- Johan Gunnar Andersson (1874–1960) Swedish; China
- E. Wyllys Andrews IV (1916–1971) American; Maya
- Manolis Andronicos (1919–1992) Greek; Greece
- Carmen Aranegui (born 1945), Spanish; Valencia and Morocco
- Mikhail Artamonov (1898–1972) Russian/Soviet; Khazar (Central Asia)
- Khaled al-Asaad (1934–2015) Syrian; Palmyra
- J. R. Aspelin (1842–1915) Finnish; Scandinavia and the Ural region
- Mick Aston (1946–2013) English; popularizer
- Miriam Astruc (1904–1963) French; Phoenician-Punic people
- Richard J. C. Atkinson (1920–1994) English; England
- Val Attenbrow (born 1942) Australian; Aboriginal stone tools, archaeology of aboriginal Sydney
- Frédérique Audoin-Rouzeau (born 1957) French; Black Death/bubonic plague
- Anthony Aveni (born 1938) U.S.; archaeoastronomy
- Nahman Avigad (1905–1992) Israeli; Jerusalem, Massada
- Hasan Awad (born 1912/13) Bedouin; excavator
- Edward R. Ayrton (1882–1914) English Egyptologist and archaeologist
- Massoud Azarnoush (1946–2008) Iranian; Sassanid archaeology

== B ==
- Churchill Babington (1821–1889) English; classical archaeology
- Leila Badre (born 1943) Lebanese
- Paul Bahn (born 1953) English; prehistoric art (rock art), Easter Island
- Geoff Bailey (born 19??) English; paleo-economy, shell middens, coastal archaeology, Greece
- Senake Bandaranayake (1938–2015) Sri Lankan; South Asia
- Adolph Francis Alphonse Bandelier (1840–1914) American; American South-West, Mexico
- Ranuccio Bianchi Bandinelli (1900–1975) Italian; Etruscans & art
- Rakhaldas Bandyopadhyay (1885–1930) Indian; Mohenjo-daro, Harappa culture
- Edward B. Banning (born 1955) Canadian; Near Eastern archaeology, archaeological survey
- Luisa Banti (1894–1978) Italian; Etruscology
- Taha Baqir (1912–1984) Iraqi; deciphered Sumero-Akkadian mathematical tablets, Akkadian law code discoveries, Babylonia, Sumerian sites
- Pessah Bar-Adon (1907–1985) Israeli; Israel (Bet Shearim, Tel Bet Yerah, Nahal Mishmar hoard)
- Ofer Bar-Yosef (1937–2020) Israeli; Palaeolithic, Neolithic
- Gabriel Barkay (1944–2026) Israeli; Israel (Jerusalem, burials, art, epigraphy, Iron Age glyptics, Ketef Hinnom)
- Graeme Barker (born 1946) British; Italian Bronze Age, Roman Libya, landscape archaeology
- Philip Barker (1920–2001) British; excavation methods, historic England
- John C. Barrett (1949–2024) British; archaeological theory, European prehistory
- Alessandro Barsanti (1858–1917) Italian; Egypt (Zawyet El Aryan)
- Diane Barwick (1938–1986) Australian; Aboriginal culture and society
- George Bass (1932–2021) American; underwater archaeology
- Thomas Bateman (1821–1861) English; England (Derbyshire)
- Leopoldo Batres (1852–1926) Mexican; Meso-America (Teotihuacan, Monte Albán, Mitla La Quemada, Xochicalco)
- Bayar Dovdoi (1946–2010) Mongolian; Mongolia
- Mary Beaudry (1950–2020) American; eastern U.S., Scotland, Caribbean, gastronomy
- Sergei Beletzkiy (1953–2022) Russian; Medieval Russia
- Anna Belfer-Cohen (born 1949) Israeli; Upper Palaeolithic and Epipalaeolithic Levant
- Gertrude Bell (1868–1926) English; adventurer and Middle Eastern archaeologist, formed the Baghdad Archaeological Museum (now Iraqi Museum)
- Harry Charles Purvis Bell (1851–1937) British; first Commissioner of Archaeology in Ceylon
- Peter Bellwood (born 1943) Australian; Southeast Asia and the Pacific; origins of agriculture and resulting cultural, linguistic and biological developments (worldwide)| interdisciplinary connections between archaeology, linguistics and human biology
- Giovanni Battista Belzoni (1778–1823) Italian/Venetian; Egypt
- Erez Ben-Yosef (born 19??) Israeli; archaeometallurgy
- Norbert Benecke (born 1954) German; zooarchaeology
- Crystal Bennett (1918–1987) British; Jordan
- Emma Benson (1866-1944) Irish; Egypt, archeologist
- James Theodore Bent (1852–1897) British; eastern Mediterranean, Africa, Arabia.
- Dumitru Berciu (1907–1998) Romanian; South-Eastern and Central Europe, Geto-Dacians, Thracians, Celts
- Sofia Berezanska (1924–2024) Ukrainian; Bronze Age
- Lee Berger (born 1965) U.S.; paleo-anthropology
- Folke Bergman (1902–1946) Swedish; Xiaohe Tomb complex in China
- Andrea Berlin (born 19??) U.S.; Achaemenid, Hellenistic, and Roman East; ceramics
- Gerhard Bersu (1889–1964) German; Europe (England etc.)
- Charles Ernest Beule (1826–1874) French; Greece
- Paolo Biagi (born 1948) Italian; Eurasian Mesolithic and Neolithic, Pakistan prehistory
- Geoffrey Bibby (1917–2001) British; Arabia
- Penny Bickle (born 19??) British; bioarchaeology, Neolithic
- Clarence Bicknell (1842–1918) British; cataloged petroglyphs at Vallée des Merveilles, France
- Martin Biddle (born 1937) British; medieval and post-medieval archaeology in Great Britain
- Manfred Bietak (born 1940) Austrian; Egypt
- Fereidoun Biglari (born 1970) Iranian Kurdish; Paleolithic
- Lewis Binford (1930–2011) American; U.S., France, theory
- Hiram Bingham (1875–1956) U.S.; discovered Machu Picchu
- Flavio Biondo (1392–1463) Italian; Rome
- Avraham Biran (1909–2008) Israeli; Near East (Israel (Tel Dan))
- Caroline Bird (born 19??) Australia; heritage and indigenous studies research
- Judy Birmingham (born 1932) Australian; historical archaeology in Australia, Irrawang pottery, Tasmania
- Glenn Albert Black (1900–1964) U.S.; US Mid-West
- Carl Blegen (1888–1971) U.S.; Troy
- Elizabeth Blegen (1888–1966) U.S.; Greece, educator
- Frederick Jones Bliss (1857–1939) U.S.; Palestine
- John Boardman (1927–2024) British; Classical archaeology, especially Greek architecture
- Jean Boisselier (1912–1996) French; Khmer, Southeast Asia
- Nicole Boivin (born 19??) Canadian; migration out of Africa, long-distance maritime trade
- Larissa Bonfante (1931–2019) U.S.; Etruscans
- Giacomo Boni (1859–1925) Italian; Roman architecture
- Ludwig Borchardt (1863–1938) German; Egypt (Amarna)
- François Bordes (1919–1981) French; paleolithic, typology, knapping
- Barbara Borg (born 1960) German; Classical archaeology
- Jacques Boucher de Crèvecœur de Perthes (1788–1868) French; France
- Stephen Bourke (born 19??) Australian; Pella, Jordan
- Jole Bovio Marconi (1897–1986) Italian; Neolithic Sicily
- Sandra Bowdler (born 1946) Australian; Australian Indigenous archaeology, pre-neolithic East and Southeast Asia
- Harriet Boyd Hawes (1871–1945) American; Greece and Crete; Minoan
- Richard Bradley (born 1946) British; prehistoric Europe (especially Britain)
- Linda Schreiber Braidwood (1909–2003) U.S.; Near East
- Robert John Braidwood (1907–2003) U.S.; Turkey
- Iosif Benyaminovich Brashinsky (1928–1982) U.S.S.R.; Scythians
- Charles Etienne Brasseur de Bourbourg (1814–1874) French; Meso-America
- James Henry Breasted (1865–1935) U.S.; Egypt
- Adela Breton (1849–1923) British; Mexico
- Eric Breuer (born 1968) Swiss; Roman/Medieval chronology
- Jacques Breuer (1956–2024) Belgian; Roman and Merovingian Belgium
- Henri Breuil (1877–1961) French; cave art
- Robert Brier (born 1943) U.S.; Egypt paleopathology
- Patrick M.M.A. Bringmans (born 1970) Belgian; Palaeolithic Archaeology and Paleoanthropology
- Srečko Brodar (1893–1987) Slovene; Upper Paleolithic
- Mary Brodrick (c. 1858–1933) English; Egyptology
- Alison S. Brooks (born 19??) American; Paleolithic, particularly the Middle Stone Age of Africa
- Myrtle Florence Broome (c. 1888–1978) English; Egyptology, illustrator
- Don Brothwell (1933–2016) British; paleopathology
- Frank Edward Brown (1908–1988) American; Mediterranean
- Elizabeth Brumfiel (1945–2012) U.S.; Mesoamerica
- Caitlin E. Buck (born 1964) British; statistics, radiocarbon dating
- Hallie Buckley (born 19??) New Zealand; bioarchaeology
- Sue Bulmer (1933–2016) American; New Zealand, Papua New Guinea
- James Burgess (1832–1916) Scottish; 19th-century India
- Heather Burke (born 1966) Australian; historical archaeology, field methods
- Aubrey Burl (1926–2020) British; British megalithic monuments
- Les Bursill (1945–2019) Australian; Dharawal people, Sutherland Shire, Illawarra
- Alexander Butyagin (born 1971) Russian; ancient Greek colonies (Crimea)
- Karl Butzer (1934–2016) U.S.; environmental archaeology
- Ernst Boetticher (1842–1930): Prussian amateur archaeologist

== C ==
- Errett Callahan (1937–2019) American; experimental archaeology
- Frank Calvert (1828–1908) English; Troy
- Raissa Calza (1894–1979) Ukrainian; Italy (Ostia)
- Elizabeth Warder Crozer Campbell (1893–1971) American; California
- Scott Cane (born 1954) Australian; Australia, desert people of Australia
- Luigi Canina (1795–1856) Italian; Italy (Tusculum, Appian Way)
- Gheorghe I. Cantacuzino (1937–2019) Romanian; Romania
- Bob Carr (born 1947) American; Florida historic Indians
- Maureen Carroll (born 1953) British; Roman archaeology
- Martin Carver (born 1941) British; Early Middle Ages in Northern Europe, Sutton Hoo
- Howard Carter (1874–1939) English; Egypt
- Alfonso Caso (1896–1970) Mexican; Mexico
- Gertrude Caton Thompson (1888–1985) English; Egyptm
- Helena Cehak-Holubowiczowa (1902–1979) Polish; Poland
- C. W. Ceram (1915–1972) German; popularizer
- Dilip Chakrabarti (born 1941) Indian; South Asia (Ganges Plain)
- John Leland Champe (1895–1978) American?; Great Plains
- Jean-François Champollion (1790–1832) French; Egypt
- Kwang-chih Chang (1931–2001) Chinese/Taiwanese; China
- Doris Emerson Chapman (1903–1990) British; prehistory
- Arlen F. Chase (born 1953) American; Mesoamerica
- Diane Zaino Chase (born 1953) American; Mesoamerica
- George Henry Chase (1874–1952) American; Heraion of Argos
- Alfredo Chavero (1841–1906) Mexican; Mexico
- Maurice Chehab (1904–1994) Lebanese; archaeology Lebanon
- Chen Mengjia (1911–1966) Chinese; China
- Chen Tiemei (1935–2018) Chinese; scientific archaeology and radiocarbon dating
- Chen Xingcan (born 1964) Chinese; China, history of Chinese archaeology
- John F. Cherry (born 19??) Welsh; Aegean prehistory
- Vere Gordon Childe (1892–1957) Australian; Europe / neolithic
- Choe Nam-ju (1905-1980) Korean; Silla culture (Korea)
- Choi Mong-lyong (born 1946) Korean; Korea (Mumin pottery period)
- Neil Christie (born 19??) British; Late Antiquity and the Middle Ages
- Leopoldo Cicognara (1767–1834) Italian; Italy
- Muazzez İlmiye Çığ (1914–2024) Turkish; Sumerology
- Jacques Cinq-Mars (1941 or 1942–2021) Canadian; Yukon, early man in North America
- Amanda Claridge (1949–2022) British; Rome
- John Desmond Clark (1916–2002) English; Africa
- Grahame Clark (1907–1995) British; Mesolith and economy
- Kate Clark (19??) industrial archaeology and museum
- Bob Clarke (Historian) (born 1964) English; Prehistoric and Modern Era
- David Clarke (1937–1976) English; theory
- Stephen Clarke (born 19??) Welsh; Wales
- Albert Tobias Clay (1866–1925) American; Assyriology
- John Clegg (1935–2015) Australian; rock art
- Eric H. Cline (born 1960) American; Ancient Near East, Aegean prehistory
- Jean Clottes (born 1933) French; European cave art
- Juliet Clutton-Brock (1933–2015) English; zooarchaeology
- Fay-Cooper Cole (1881–1961) American; U.S. Mid-West
- Bryony Coles (born 1946) British; prehistoric archaeology, wetland archaeology, Somerset Levels, Doggerland
- John Coles (1930–2020) British; wetland archaeology, Bronze Age, experimental archaeology
- Donald Collier (1911–1995) American; Ecuadorian and Andean archaeology
- John Collis (born 1944) English; Iron Age Europe
- Dominique Collon (born 1940) Belgian; cylinder seals of the Near East
- Sir Richard Colt Hoare (1758–1838) English, England
- Margaret Conkey (born 1943) American; Upper Paleolithic France
- Robin Coningham (born 1965) British; South Asian archaeology and archaeological ethics
- Diane Atnally Conlin (born 1963) American; Roman art and architecture
- Joan Breton Connelly (born 19??) American; Cyprus, Greek art, female agency
- Niculae Conovici (1948–2005) Romanian; Romania, amphorae
- Graham Connah (1934–2023) South Africa; historical archaeology
- Richard Cooke (1946–2023) British; Panama, archaeozoology
- Gudrun Corvinus (1931–2006) German; India/Nepal/Africa
- Peter Coutts (1934–?) Australian; historical archaeology
- George Cowgill (1929–2018) American; Mesoamerica (Teotihuacan)
- O.G.S. Crawford (1886–1957) English; aerial archaeology
- Rachel Crellin (born 19??) Manx; metal working, theory, British Isles
- Aedeen Cremin (born 1940) Irish born, Australian. NSW and Canberra
- Luther Cressman (1897–1994) American; Paleo-Indians, Oregon
- Roger Cribb (1948–2007) Australian; Turkish Kurds and Australian Aborigines
- Ion Horaţiu Crişan (1928–1994)Romanian; Geto-Dacians and Celts
- William (Bill) Culican (1928–1984) Australian; Middle East, Australian historical archaeology
- Joseph George Cumming (1812–1868) English; Isle of Man
- Vicki Cummings (19??), British; prehistoric archaeologist
- Barry Cunliffe (born 1939) British; Iron Age Europe, Celts
- Ben Cunnington (1861–1950) English; prehistoric England (Wiltshire)
- Alexander Cunningham (1814–1893) English; "Father of Indian Archaeology"
- Maud Cunnington (1869–1951) Welsh; prehistoric Britain (Salisbury Plain)
- William Cunnington (1754–1810) English; prehistoric Britain (Salisbury Plain)
- James Curle (1861?–1944) Scottish; Roman Scotland (Trimontium), Gotland
- Florin Curta (born 1965) American; Eastern Europe
- Ernst Curtius (1814–1896) German; Greece
- Clive Eric Cussler (1931–2020) American; underwater archaeology

== D ==
- Gaetano d'Ancora (1751–1816) Italian; Italy
- Albéric d'Auxy (1836–1914) Belgian; Belgium
- Bruno Dagens (1935–2023) French; Khmer and India
- Constantin Daicoviciu (1898–1973) Romanian; Romania
- George F. Dales (1927–1992) American; Nippur, Indus valley civilizations
- Mary Dallas (1952–2023) Scottish-born Australian, Aboriginal cultural heritage management
- Ahmad Hasan Dani (1920–2009) Pakistani; South Asian archaeology
- Glyn Daniel (1914–1986) Welsh; European Neolithic; popularization of archaeology
- Ken Dark (born 19?) British; Roman and medieval Europe and the Mediterranean, theory
- Raymond Dart (1893–1988) Australian; paleoanthropology: Australopithecus africanus
- Timothy Darvill (1957–2024) British; Britain
- Raksha Dave (Born 1977) British; Field and Public Archaeologist, President of Council for British Archaeology
- Janet Davidson (born 1941) New Zealand; New Zealand, Pacific Islands
- Jack L. Davis (born 1950) American; ancient Greece
- Theodore M. Davis (1837–1915) American; Egypt
- William Boyd Dawkins (1837–1929) British; antiquity of man
- Touraj Daryaee (born 1967) Iranian; ancient Persia (Iran)
- Don Martino de Zilva Wickremasinghe (1865–1937) Sri Lankan; epigraphist and archaeologist, Sri Lanka
- Janette Deacon (born 1939) South African; rock art, heritage management
- Hilary Deacon (1936–2010) South African; Africa, antiquity of man
- Corinne Debaine-Francfort (born 19??) French; Eastern Central Asian and protohistoric China
- James Deetz (1930–2000) American; historical archaeology
- Warren DeBoer (died May 24, 2020) American; North and South America, ethnoarchaeology, ceramics
- James P. Delgado (born 1958) American; maritime archaeologist
- Arthur Demarest (fl. 2000 AD) American; Maya
- Robin Dennell (born 1947) British; prehistoric archaeologist
- Paulus Edward Pieris Deraniyagala (1900–1976) Sri Lankan; paleontologist, zoologist, director of the National Museum of Ceylon
- Siran Upendra Deraniyagala (1942–2021) Sri Lankan; Director-General of Archaeology in the Department of Archaeology of Sri Lanka
- Louis Felicien de Saulcy (1807–1880) French; Holy Land
- Jules Desnoyers (1800–1887) French; antiquity of man
- Rúaidhrí de Valera (1916–1978) Irish; megalithic tombs in Ireland
- Dragotin Dežman (1821–1889) Slovenian; Ljubljana Marsh, Iron Age in Lower Carniola
- Harold L. Dibble (1951-2018) American; paleolithic lithics
- Adolphe Napoleon Didron (1806–1867) French; Medievalist, Christian iconography
- Tom D. Dillehay (born 1947) American-Chilean; ethnoarchaeologist, early occupation of the Americas
- Kelly Dixon (born 1970) American; historical archaeology of the American West
- Brian Dobson (1931–2012) British; Hadrian's Wall, the Roman Army
- Donald Brian Doe (1920–2005) British; Arabia
- Dong Zuobin (1895–1963) Chinese/Taiwanese; oracle bones, Yinxu
- Gertrud Dorka (1893–1976), German archaeologist, prehistorian and museum director
- Wilhelm Dörpfeld (1853–1940) German; Greece
- Trude Dothan (1922–2016) Austrian; Israel
- Claude Doumet-Serhal (born 1958) Lebanese; history and archaeology of Sidon
- Hans Dragendorff (1870–1941) German; Roman ceramics
- Penelope Dransart (born 19??) British?; South American anthropology
- Carol van Driel-Murray (born 1950) British; gender archaeology, Roman archaeology, leather
- Angela von den Driesch (1934–2012) German; osteoarchaeology
- Hilary du Cros (born 1962) Australian; history of Australian archaeology
- Duan Qingbo (1964–2019) Chinese; Mausoleum of the First Qin Emperor
- Roger Duff (1912–1978) New Zealander; New Zealand
- Katherine Dunbabin (born 1941) British?; classical archaeology, Roman art
- Robert Dunnell (1947–2010) American; theory, U.S. Mid-West
- Louis Dupree (1925–1989) American; Afghanistan
- E. C. L. During Caspers (1934–1996) Dutch; Prehistoric Mesopotamia, South Asian, Persian Gulf
- Robert H. Dyson (1927–2020) American; Near Eastern archaeology

== E ==
- Elizabeth Eames (1918–2008) British; specialist in English medieval tiles
- Hella Eckardt (born 19??) British; Roman archaeology, material culture
- Campbell Cowan Edgar (1870–1938) British; Cyclades and Hellenistic Egypt, papyrology specialist
- Amelia Edwards (1831–1892) British; Egypt
- Ricardo Eichmann (born 1955) German; Near Eastern archaeology
- George Eogan (1930–2021) Irish; Knowth (Ireland)
- Kenan Erim (1929–1990) Turkish; Hellenistic Anatolia
- Ufuk Esin (1933–2008) Turkish; prehistoric Anatolia, archaeometry
- Roland Étienne (born 1944) French; ancient Greece and Hellenistic period
- Damian Evans (1975-2023) Australian-Canadian; Angkor, lidar
- Sir Arthur Evans (1851–1941) British; Aegean archaeology (Minoan studies, Knossos, Linear A and B)
- Sir John Evans (1823–1908) English; British archaeology

== F ==
- Georg Fabricius (1516–1571) German; Roman epigraphy
- Brian M. Fagan (1936-2025) British; generalist, popularist, history of archaeology
- Panagiotis Faklaris (born 1950) Greek; classical archaeology, excavator of Vergina
- Fan Jinshi (born 1938) Chinese; Dunhuang
- William Fash (born 1954) American; Maya
- Charles H. Faulkner (1937–2022) American; Tennessee, historic archaeology
- Neil Faulkner (1958–2022) British; Norfolk, Jordan
- Rev. Bryan Faussett (1720–1776) English; Anglo-Saxon Kent (England)
- Carlo Fea (1753–1836) Italian; Roman archaeology, archaeological law
- Gary M. Feinman (born 1951) American; Mesoamerica, Oaxaca
- Sir Charles Fellows (1799–1860) British; Asia Minor
- Karl Ludwig Fernow (1763–1808) German; Roman archaeology
- J. Walter Fewkes (1850–1930) American; south-west USA (Hohokam; Pueblo, pottery)
- Irving Finkel (born 1951) British; cuneiform tablets
- Israel Finkelstein (born 1949) Israeli; Bronze Age & Iron Age in Israel, Megiddo (Israel)
- George R. Fischer (1937–2016) American; underwater archaeology
- Peter M. Fischer (born 1967) Austrian-Swedish; Eastern Mediterranean, Near East
- Christopher T. Fisher (born 1967) American; Meso-America, LiDAR, Earth Archive
- Cleo Rickman Fitch (1910–1995) American; Roman archaeology
- William W. Fitzhugh (born 1943) American; circumpolar archaeology
- Kent Flannery (born 1934) American; Mesoamerica
- Josephine Flood (born 1938) Australian; Aboriginal prehistory of the Australia Cloggs Cave
- Hannah Fluck (born 19??) British; policy and climate change
- Robert Bruce Foote (1834–1912) British; India: "the father of Indian prehistory"
- Adam Ford (born 19??) Australian; host of documentary series Who's Been Sleeping in My House?
- James A. Ford (1911–1968) American; Southeastern United States
- Sally Foster (born 19??) Scottish; Medieval Scotland
- Alfred Foucher (1865–1952) French; Afghanistan (Gandahar art) and southern Africa
- Aileen Fox (1907–2005) British; South West England
- Cyril Fox (1882–1967) English; Wales
- William Flinders Petrie (1853–1942) English; Egyptology, methodology
- David Frankel (born 19??) Australian; Cyprus, Syria, Koongine Cave (Australia)
- Barry L. Frankhauser (1943–2014) Australian; archaeometry, residue analysis, Maori earth ovens, sourcing Australian ochres
- Elizabeth French (1931–2021) British; Mycenaean Greece, especially the site of Mycenae, and Mycenaean terracottas
- George Frison (1924–2020) American; Paleoindian archaeology, lithic tools, pale-oarchaeology
- Gayle J. Fritz (born 19??) American; paleo-ethnobotany, agriculture in North America
- Honor Frost (1924–2010) British; maritime archaeology, Mediterranean, stone anchors
- Dorian Fuller (born 19??) American; archaeobotany, domestication

== G ==
- Charles Godakumbura (1907–1977 ) Commissioner of Archaeology in Ceylon (Sri Lanka) from 1956 to 1967
- Christopher Gaffney (born 1962) British; geophysics
- Vincent Gaffney (born 1958) British; landscape archaeology
- Lamia Al-Gailani Werr (1938–2019) Iraqi; Mesopotamian archaeology
- Antoine Galland (1646–1715) French; numismatics, Middle East
- Thomas Gann (1867–1938) Irish; Mesoamerica, Maya
- Sandor (Alexander) Gallus (1907–1996) Australian; Pleistocene Aboriginal occupation Koonalda Cave South Australia Dry Creek archaeological site Keilor
- Carl Jacob Gardberg (1926–2010) Finnish; director of the Finnish Heritage Agency
- Jean-Claude Gardin (1925–2013) French; Bactria, theory in archaeology, computing in archaeology
- Andrew Gardner (born 19??) British? Roman archaeology
- Percy Gardner (1846–1937) English; classical archaeology
- Yosef Garfinkel (born 1956) Israeli; Israel
- Peter Garlake (1934–2011) Zimbabwean; Zimbabwe
- Dorothy Garrod (1892–1968) British; paleolithic
- John Garstang (1876–1954) British; Anatolia, Southern Levant
- Kathleen O'Neal Gear (born 1954) American; US West; archaeological fiction
- William Gell (1777–1836) English; Classical archaeology
- Friedrich William Eduard Gerhard (1795–1867) German; Rome
- Roman Ghirshman (1895–1979) French; Persian sites in Iran and Afghanistan
- Diane Gifford-Gonzalez American (born 19??) zooarchaeology
- John Wesley Gilbert (1864–1923) first African-American archaeologist; Classical
- Marija Gimbutas (1921–1994) Lithuanian-American; Neolithic & Bronze Age
- Pere Bosch-Gimpera (1891–1974) Spanish-Mexican; prehistoric Spain
- Einar Gjerstad (1897–1988) Swedish; Cyprus and Rome
- Kathryn Gleason (born 1957) American; archaeology of landscape architecture
- Albert Glock (1925–1992) American; Palestinian archaeology
- Franck Goddio (born 1947) French; underwater archaeology, Heracleion (Egypt)
- John Mann Goggin (1916–1963) American; typology, colonial Caribbean
- Lynne Goldstein (born 1953) American; prehistoric eastern North America, mortuary
- Jack Golson (1926–2023) Australian; Melanesia, Polynesia and Micronesia Savai'i island, Samoa
- Albert Goodyear (born 19??) American; Paleo-Indians
- Alice Gorman (born 1964) Australian; Space archaeology, contemporary archaeology, Indigenous Australian archaeology, stone tools, orbital debris, space as a cultural landscape
- Carlos J. Gradin (1918–2002) Argentine; Patagonian Paleo-Indians
- Ian Graham (1923–2017) British; Mayans
- Boris Grakov (1899–1970) Soviet/Russian; Scythians and Sarmatians
- Elizabeth Caroline Gray (1800–1887) Italy; Etruscans
- Roger Green (1932–2009) American; New Zealand, Pacific Islands
- Raphael Greenberg (born 19??) Israeli?; Israel
- Kevin Greene (born 19??) British; classical archaeology
- Elizabeth S. Greene (born 1970) North American; underwater archaeology, classics
- J. Patrick Greene (born 19??) British; Medieval England
- Haskel J. Greenfield (born 1953) American; zooarchaeology, Balkans, Middle East
- Canon William Greenwell (1820–1918) British; Neolithic England
- Alan Greaves (born 1969) British; Turkey
- James Bennett Griffin (1905–1997) American; prehistoric eastern North America
- Frances Griffith (born 19??) British; aerial archaeology
- W. F. Grimes (1905–1988) Welsh; London
- Klaus Grote (born 1947) German; Lower Saxony (Germany)
- Nikolai Grube (born 1962) German; Mayan epigraphy
- Raimondo Guarini (1765–1852) Italian; Classical
- Cecily Margaret Guido (1912 – 1994) English; Britain: hillforts, burial traditions, glass beads
- Niède Guidon (1933–2025) Brazilian; early humans in Brazil
- Prishantha Gunawardena (born 1968) Sri Lankan; Sri Lanka
- Guo Moruo (1892–1978) Chinese; China
- Gustaf VI Adolf of Sweden (1882–1973) Swedish; Classical

== H ==
- Labib Habachi (1906–1984) Egyptian; Egypt
- Joseph Hackin (1886–1941) French; Afghanistan
- Marie Hackin (1905–1941) French; Afghanistan
- Maya Haïdar Boustani (born 1966) Lebanese; Lebanon
- Robert Hall (1927–2012) American; U.S. Mid-West
- Abdulameer al-Hamdani (1967–2022) Iraqi; Iraq, digital database, artifact rescue
- Osman Hamdi Bey (1842–1911) Ottoman Turkish; Syria and Lebanon
- Yannis Hamilakis (born 1966) Greek; prehistoric Aegean, Greek migration and historical archaeology
- Robert Hamilton (1905–1995) British; Near Eastern archaeology
- Norman Hammond (born 1944) British; Afghanistan, Maya
- Richard D. Hansen (born 19??) American; Meso-America
- Alexander Hardcastle (1872–1933) English; Agrigento, Sicily
- Anthony Harding (born 1946) British; Bronze Age Europe
- Phil Harding (born 1950) British; Britain, flint-knapping
- James Penrose Harland (1891–1973) American; Aegean
- J.C. "Pinky" Harrington (1901–1998) American; U.S. historical archaeology
- Selim Hassan (1886–1961) Egyptian; Egypt
- Ayman Hassouna (b. 19??) Palestinian; archaeology of Gaza
- Emil Haury (1904–1992) American; Southwestern United States
- Francis J. Haverfield (1860–1919) English; Roman Britain
- Zahi Hawass (born 1947) Egyptian; Egypt
- Christopher Hawkes (1905–1992) English; European archaeology
- Jacquetta Hawkes (1910–1996) English; prehistory of England, Europe, Minoa
- Sonia Chadwick Hawkes (1933–1999) English; European archaeology, early medieval archaeology
- Clarence Leonard Hay (1884-1969) American; Maya civilization
- Lotte Hedeager (born 1948) Danish; Iron Age Scandinavia
- Jakob Heierli (1853–1912) Swiss; prehistoric Switzerland
- Robert Heizer (1915–1979) American; California
- Hans Helbæk (1907–1981) Danish; palaeobotany
- John Basil Hennessy (1925–2013) Australian; Near East
- Edgar Lee Hewett (1865–1946) American; U.S. South-West, antiquities law
- Christian Gottlob Heyne (1729–1812) Saxon-German; classics
- Eric Higgs (1908–1976) English; economic archaeology
- Charles Higham (born 1939) British; South East Asia
- Thomas Higham (born 19??) New Zealand; radiocarbon dating
- Bert Hodge Hill (1874–1958) American; classical archaeology
- Ida Hill (1875–1958) American; classical archaeology
- Bert Hodge Hill (1874–1958) American; classical archaeology
- Gordon Hillman (1943–2018) British; archaeobotany
- Peter Hinton (born 19??) British; England
- Hermann Hinz (1916–2000) German; Germany (Colonia Ulpia Traiana)
- Yizhar Hirschfeld (1950–2006) Israeli; Israel (Ramat HaNadiv, Qumran)
- Anna-Liisa Hirviluoto (1929–2000) Finnish; Iron Age
- Peter Hiscock (born 1957) Australian; ancient technology
- Ian Hodder (born 1948) English; theory, Catalhoyuk
- Frederick Webb Hodge (1864–1956) American; North American Indians
- Richard Hodges (born 1952) British; Middle Ages
- Birgitta Hoffmann (born 1969); Gask Ridge in Scotland
- Michael A. Hoffman (1944–1990) American; Egyptology
- Alexander Hubert Arthur Hogg (1908–1989) British; hillforts
- Frank Hole (born 1931) American; Near East
- Vance T. Holliday (born 1950) American?; Paleoindian and Great Plains geoarchaeology and archaeology
- Robert Ross Holloway (1934-2022) American; Greek and Roman numismatics, archaeology of Bronze Age Southern Italy and Sicily
- Mads Kähler Holst (born 1973) Danish; Bronze Age and Iron Age wetland sites in Denmark
- Sinclair Hood (1917–2021) British; Knossos
- Jeannette Hope (born 19??) Australian; Western New South Wales
- John Horsley (1685–1732) British; Roman Britain
- Youssef Hourany (1931–2019) Lebanese; Middle East
- Huang Wenbi (1893–1966) Chinese; China
- Huang Zhanyue (1926–2019) Chinese; China from the Han dynasty to the Tang dynasty
- John Hurst (1927–2003) British; English medieval archaeology
- Elinor Mullett Husselman (1900–1996) American; Coptic historian, papyrologist

== I ==
- Richard Indreko (1900–1961) Estonian; Estonia
- Cynthia Irwin-Williams (1936–1990) American; Southwestern archaeology
- Glynn Isaac (1937–1985) South African; African paleoanthropology
- Hideshi Ishikawa (born 1954) Japanese; Japanese and Korean archaeology
- Fumiko Ikawa-Smith (born 1930) Japanese-Canadian; East Asian and Japanese archaeology

== J ==
- Roger Jacobi (1947–2009) British; Palaeolithic and Mesolithic Britain
- Otto Jahn (1813–1869) German; classical world (art)
- Herbert Jankuhn (1905–1990) German; Haithabu (Germany)
- Jean-François Jarrige (1940–2014) French; South Asia
- Jacques Jaubert (born 1957) French; Lower Paleolithic and Middle Paleolithic, lithic technology
- Thomas Jefferson (1743–1826) U.S. President; Virginia prehistory
- Arthur J. Jelinek (1928–2022) American; Eurasian Paleolithic
- Edward B. Jelks (1922–2021 American; U.S. historical archaeology
- Jesse D. Jennings (1909–1997) American; New World
- Llewellyn Jewitt (1816–1886) English; British antiquities
- Donald Johanson (born 1943) American; paleoanthropology, Ethiopia
- Jotham Johnson (1905–1967) American; Minturno (Italy), past president of the Archaeological Institute of America
- Alexandra Jones (born 19??) American; U.S. historical archaeology
- Margaret Ursula Jones (1916–2001) British; Mucking, England
- Rebecca Jones (born 19??) British; Roman Britain
- Rhys Maengwyn Jones (1941–2001) Welsh/Australian; Tasmania
- Martha Joukowsky (1936–2022) American; Middle East (Petra), field methods
- Rosemary A. Joyce (born 1956) American; Honduras, gender
- Chris Judge (born 19??) American; eastern U.S. (Woodland, Mississippian)
- Elsie Jury (1910–1993) Canadian; historical archaeology of Ontario

== K ==
- Lili Kaelas (1919–2007) Swedish; Stone and Bronze Age
- Gilbert Kaenel (1949–2020) Swiss; Iron Age, La Tène culture
- Barbara Kaim (born 1952) Polish; ancient Iran, Parthian and Sasanian periods.
- Eduard von Kallee (1818–1888) German; Germany: found 4 Roman castra on the Limes Germanicus
- Richard Kallee (1854–1933) German; studied 102 Alemannic tombs
- Seifollah Kambakhshfard (1929–2010) Iranian; Iron Age Temple of Anahita
- Johan Kamminga (born 19??) Australian?; University of Sydney; use-wear and residues
- Georg Karo (1872–1963) German; Mycenaean and Etruscan civilizations
- Panagiotis Kavvadias (1850–1928) Greek; Greece
- Simon Keay (1954–2021) English; Roman Portus, surveys of Roman Spain and Italy
- Phoebe Keef (1898–1978) British; prehistoric archaeology, Sussex
- Bennie Carlton Keel (born 1934) American; Southeast USA, Public Archaeology, Cherokee archaeology
- Alice Beck Kehoe (born 1934) American; North America: early contact
- J. Charles Kelley (1913–1997) American; north-west Mexico
- Arthur Randolph Kelly (1900–1979) American; Southeastern USA
- Robert Laurens Kelly (born 1957) American; Western USA
- Francis Kelsey (1858–1927) American; Middle East, papyrology
- Clyde C. Kennedy (1917–1987) Canadian; Ontario, archaic period
- David L. Kennedy (born 1948) British and Australian; Roman Near East
- Jonathan Mark Kenoyer (born 1952) American; Indus Valley Civilization
- Kathleen Kenyon (1906–1978) English; Britain, Near East (Jericho)
- Alfred V. Kidder (1885–1963) American; southwestern USA, Mesoamerica
- T. R. Kidder (born 1960) American; geoarchaeology and archaeology of Southeastern United States
- Lothar Kilian (1911–2000) German; Balts, Germans, proto-Indo-European homeland
- Kim Won-yong (1922–1993) (south) Korean; Korea
- Karl Frederik Kinch (1853–1921) Danish; Ancient Macedonia, Rhodes, and Roman Greece / Byzantine Greece
- Keith Kintigh (born 19??) American; quantitative archaeology, Southwestern USA archaeology
- Athanasius Kircher (1602–1680) German; Egyptian hieroglyphics ("the father of Egyptology")
- Ella Kivikoski (1901–1990) Finnish; Finnish Iron Age
- Birthe Kjølbye-Biddle (1941–2010) Danish; early Christianity in Britain
- Richard Klein (born 1941) American; paleo-anthropology (Africa, Europe)
- Leo S. Klejn (1927-2019) Belarusian or Russian; theoretical archaeology
- Amos Kloner (1940–2019) Israeli; Talpiot Tomb (Israel), Hellenistic, Roman and Byzantine archaeology
- Sir Francis Knowles, 5th Baronet (1886–1953) English; anthropology and prehistory
- Alice Kober (1906–1950) American; Linear B
- Robert Koldewey (1855–1925) German; Near East (Babylon)
- Manfred Korfmann (1942–2005) German; Bronze Age Aegean and Anatolia (Troy)
- Hamit Zübeyir Koşay (1897–1984) Turkish; Early Bronze Age Anatolia
- Paul Kosok (1896–1959) American; Nazca geoglyphs
- Gustaf Kossinna (1858–1931) German; Germany (Neolithic, Aryan concept)
- Raiko Krauss (born 1973) German; prehistory
- Kristian Kristiansen (born 1948) Danish; Bronze Age Europe, heritage studies, archaeological theory
- Pasko Kuzman (born 1947) Macedonian; Ohrid, North Macedonia
- Elizabeth Kyazike (born 19??) Ugandan; Uganda, slave trade

== L ==
- Robert Laffineur (born ca. 1946) Belgian; Mycenaeanologist
- B. B. Lal (1921–2022) Indian; India
- Peter Lampe (born 1954) German; ancient Phrygia
- Dorothy Lamb (1887–1967) British; classical archaeology
- Luigi Lanzi (1732–1810) Italian; Etruscans
- Nancy Lapp (born 1930) American; Near Eastern archaeology, biblical archaeology
- Pierre Henri Larcher (1726–1812) French; classical archaeology
- Donald Lathrap (1927–1990) American; South America, U.S. Mid-West
- Jean-Philippe Lauer (1902–2001) French; Egypt
- Bo Lawergren (born 19??) American?; music archaeology; Mesopotamia
- T. E. Lawrence (1888–1935) British; adventurer, Middle East
- Sir Austen Henry Layard (1817–1894) British; Middle East (Kuyunjik and Nimrud)
- Estelle Lazer (born 19??) Australian; human skeletal remains discovered at Pompeii
- Foss Leach (born 1942) New Zealand; New Zealand
- Louis Leakey (1903–1972) British; archaeologist and paleoanthropologist, Africa
- Mary Leakey (1913–1996) British; archaeologist and paleoanthropologist, Africa
- Richard Leakey (1944–2022) Kenyan; paleoanthropology, Africa
- Edward Thurlow Leeds (1877–1955) British; Keeper of the Ashmolean Museum 1928–1945
- Anthony J. Legge (1939–2013) British; archaeozoology
- Delphine Philippe-Lemaître (1798–1863) French historian, archaeologist, botanist
- Pirkko-Liisa Lehtosalo-Hilander (born 1934) Finnish; Iron Age
- Charles Lenormant (1802–1859) French; Egypt, Greece, Middle East
- François Lenormant (1837–1883) French; Assyriologist
- Mark P. Leone (1940–2024) American; theory, historical archaeology
- Dana Lepofsky (born 1958) Canadian; paleoethnobotany, Northwest Coast
- André Leroi-Gourhan (1911–1986) French; theory, art, Paleolithic
- Jean Antoine Letronne (1787–1848) French; Greece, Rome, Egypt
- Gerson Levi-Lazzaris (born 1979) Brazilian; ethnoarchaeology
- Carenza Lewis (born 1963) British; popularizer; Medieval Britain
- Jodie Lewis (born 19??) British; prehistoric archaeology
- Madeline Kneberg Lewis (1901–1996) American; typologist, Illustrator
- Mary Lewis (born 19??) British; bioarchaeologist
- David Lewis-Williams (born 1934) South African; cognitive archaeology, Upper-Palaeolithic and Bushmen rock art
- Edward Lhuyd (1660–1709) Welsh; Britain
- Li Feng (born 1962) Chinese/American; early China Yinxu and Yangshao culture
- Li Ji (1896–1979) Chinese; China
- Li Liu (born 1953) Chinese/American; neolithic and Bronze Age China, "the father of Chinese archaeology"
- Li Xueqin (1933–2019) Chinese; early China
- Liang Siyong (1904–1954) Chinese; China
- Mary Aiken Littauer (1912–2005) American; horses in pre-history
- Gary Lock (born 1948) British; computational archaeology, European prehistory
- Georg Loeschcke (1852–1915) German; Mycenaean pottery
- Helen Loney (born 19??) British? prehistoric archaeology and pottery studies
- Samuel Kirkland Lothrop (1892–1965) American; Central and South America and the Caribbean
- Victor Loret (1859–1946) French; Egypt and Southern Africa
- William A. Longacre (1937–2015) American; southwestern USA, "New Archaeology
- Harry Lourandos (born 1945) Australian; hunter-gatherer intensification
- Sir John Lubbock (1834–1913) English; terminology, evolution, generalist
- Adam Łukaszewicz (born 1950) Polish; Roman period in Egypt, papyrologist
- Rev. William Collings Lukis (1817–1892) British; megaliths of Great Britain and France
- Cajsa S. Lund (sv) (born 1940) Swedish; music archaeology
- Frances Lynch (born 19??) Welsh; Wales
- Albert Lythgoe (1868–1934) American; Egyptologist and a curator at the Metropolitan Museum of Art

== M ==
- Ma Chengyuan (1927–2004) Chinese; authority on ancient Chinese bronzes
- Robert Alexander Stewart Macalister (1870–1950) Irish; Palestine, Celtic archaeology
- Burton MacDonald (1939–c. 2022) Canadian; biblical archaeology
- Eve MacDonald (born 19??) Canadian; classical archaeologist
- John MacEnery (1797–1841) Irish; Paleolithic
- Richard MacNeish (1918–2001) American; Canada, Iroquois (U.S./Canada), Meso-America, discovered origins of maize
- Aren Maeir (born 1958) Israeli; Ancient Levant, Israel, Philistines
- Giuseppe Maggi (1930–2025), Italian archaeologist
- Mai Yinghao (1929–2016) Chinese; archaeology of the Nanyue kingdom in Guangzhou
- Yousef Majidzadeh (born 1938) Iranian; Jiroft culture (Iran)
- Sadegh Malek Shahmirzadi (1940–2020) Iranian; ancient Persia (Iran)
- Alexis Mallon (1875–1934) French; Levantine prehistory
- James Patrick Mallory (born 1945) Irish-American; Indo-European origins, proto-Celtic culture
- Max Mallowan (1904–1978) British; Middle East
- John Manley (born 1952) British; Roman Britain
- Joyce Marcus (born 19??) American; Latin America
- Auguste-Édouard Mariette (1821–1881) French; Egypt
- Spyridon Marinatos (1901–1974) Greek; Greece, Mycenaeans
- Alexander Marshack (1918–2004) American; Paleolithic era
- Fiona Marshall (born 19??) American; zooarchaeology and ethnoarchaeology
- James A. Marshall (died 2006) American; eastern North American earthworks
- John Hubert Marshall (1876–1958) British; Indus Valley Civilization, Taxila, Crete
- Pamela Marshall (born 19??) British? buildings archaeologist and castellologist
- Marjan Mashkour (born 19??) Iranian; zooarchaeology of Europe and Middle East
- J. Alden Mason (1885–1967) American; New World archaeology
- Ronald J. Mason (1929–2023) Upper Great Lakes
- Gaston Maspero (1846–1916) French; Egypt
- Therkel Mathiassen (1892–1967) Danish; Arctic region
- Peter Mathews (born 1951) Australian; Maya hieroglyphs
- Galina Ivanovna Matveeva (1933–2008) Russian; Central Russia/Volga region
- Alfred P. Maudslay (1850–1931) British; Mayans
- Valerie Maxfield (born 19??) British? Roman archaeology
- Sally Kate May (born 1979) Australian; indigenous rock art
- Amihai Mazar (born 1942) Israeli; Israel, Biblical archaeology
- Benjamin Mazar (1906–1995) Israeli; Israel, Biblical archaeology
- Eilat Mazar (1956–2021) Israeli; Jerusalem, Phoenicians
- Gaby Mazor (born 1944) Israeli; Bet She'an (Israeli)
- August Mau (1840–1909) German; Pompeii
- Sally McBrearty (1949-2023) American; Palaeolithic archaeology
- Isabel McBryde (born 1934) Australian; "Mother of Australian Archaeology," axe sourcing studies
- Charles McBurney (1914–1979) British; Britain (Upper Paleolithic), Libya, Iran, cave art
- Anna Marguerite McCann (1933–2017) American; Underwater Archaeology
- Fred McCarthy (1905–1997) Australian; Australia's Aborigines
- Aleksandra McClain (born 19??) medieval and church archaeology
- Robert McGhee (born 1941) Canadian; Arctic
- Patrick Edward McGovern (1944–2025) American; biomolecular archaeology
- Jacqueline McKinley (born 19??) British; osteoarchaeology
- Betty Meehan (born 1933) Australian; Maningrida, Australia
- Vincent Megaw (born 1934) Australian; Early Celtic Art in Britain
- Betty Meggers (1921–2012) American; South America
- Chuck Meide (born 1971) American; maritime and underwater archaeology; discovered the shipwrecks La Belle (1686), Storm Wreck (1782), and Anniversary Wreck (ca. 1760s-1800)
- James Mellaart (1925–2012) British; discoverer of Çatalhöyük
- Paul Mellars (1939–2022) British; Neanderthals, European mesolithic
- Michael Mercati (1541–1593) Italian [born in Rome]; lithics
- Roger Mercer (1944–2018) British; Neolithic and Bronze Age British Isles
- Prosper Mérimée (1803–1870) French; French monuments
- Kazimierz Michałowski (1901–1981) Polish; Mediterranean archaeology
- Jerald T. Milanich (born 19??) American; U.S. south-east (Florida)
- Walter Minchinton (1921–1996) British; industrial archaeology
- Sir Ellis Minns (1874–1953) British; eastern Europe
- Pierre de Miroschedji (born 1944) French; Near East
- Keneiloe Molopyane (born 1987) South African; biological archaeologist and paleoanthropologist
- Oscar Montelius (1843–1921) Swedish; seriation, Europe (Scandinavia)
- Pierre Montet (1885–1966) French; Lebanon, Egypt (Tanis)
- Harri Moora (1900–1968) Estonian; Iron Age Baltics
- Andrew M.T. Moore (born 19??) English; neolithic, Middle East
- Clarence Bloomfield Moore (1852–1936) American; southern United States
- Warren K. Moorehead (1866–1939) American; prehistoric eastern United States
- Robert Morkot (born 1957) British? Egyptology
- Sylvanus G. Morley (1883–1948) American; Mesoamerica, especially Maya
- Ann Axtell Morris (1900–1945) American; southwestern U.S. and Mexico
- Earl H. Morris (1889–1956) American; southwestern U.S. and Mexico
- Dan Morse (1935–2024) American; Central Mississippi Valley
- Kate Morse (1958–2023) Australian; Western Australia Pleistocene
- Phyllis Morse (Anderson) (born 1934) American; Central Mississippi Valley
- John Robert Mortimer (1825–1911) English; England (barrows)
- Mike Morwood (1950–2013) Australian; Homo floresiensis
- Sabatino Moscati (1922–1997) Italian; Phoenicians
- Penelope Mountjoy (1946–2025) British; Mycenaean ceramics
- Amini Aza Mturi Tanzanian; Palaeolithic archaeology
- Keith Muckelroy (1951–1980) British?; maritime archaeology
- Suʻād Māhir Muḥammad (1917–1996) Egyptian; Egypt
- David Mullin (born 19??) prehistoric archaeology
- William Mulloy (1917–1978) American; Polynesia
- John Mulvaney (1925–2016) Australian; "Father of Australian archaeology"
- Ken Mulvaney (born 19??) Australian; Aboriginal engagement, Burrup Peninsula rock art
- J. T. Munby (Born 1954) English; Britain
- Natalie Munro (born 19??) American; zooarchaeology
- Stephen Munro (born 19??) Australian; engraved fossil shell from Java
- Ana María Muñoz Amilibia (1932–2019) Spanish; Spain
- Diana Murray (born 1952); Scottish; Scotland
- Margaret Murray (1863–1963) Anglo-Indian; Egyptologist
- Tim Murray (born 1955) Australian; history of archaeology
- Oscar White Muscarella (1931–2022) American; Persia, Anatolia
- George E. Mylonas (1898–1988) Greek; Greece and Aegean

== N ==
- Nabonidus (6th century B.C.) Babylonian; Babylon," world's first archaeologist"
- Ramachandran Nagaswamy (1930–2022) Indian; south-Indian statues
- Maysoon al-Nahar (born 19??) Jordanian; Palaeoarchaeology of the Southern Levant
- Dimitri Nakassis (born 1975) American; Greece
- Alma Mekondjo Nankela (born 19??) Namibian; Namibia, rock art
- Khaled Nashef (1942–2009) Palestinian; Near East
- Ezzat Negahban (1926–2009) Iranian; Iran
- Sarah Milledge Nelson (1931–2020) American; Korea, Hongshan (China), gender
- Ion Nestor (1905–1974) Romanian; Balkans (Sirmium)
- Ehud Netzer (1934–2010) Israeli; Israel (Herodian architecture)
- René Neuville (1899–1952) French; prehistory of the Southern Levant
- Lisa Nevett (born 1965) British; Greece
- Charles Thomas Newton (1816–1894) British; Classical archaeology
- Constantin S. Nicolăescu-Plopșor (1900–1968) Romania; Romanian prehistory
- Christiane Desroches Noblecourt (1913–2011) French; Egypt (Nubian temples)
- Francisco Nocete (born 1961) Spanish; Spain
- Ivor Noël Hume (1927–2017) British; eastern U.S. seaboard historical archaeology, method and theory of historical archaeology
- Zelia Nuttall (1857–1933) American; Mexico

== O ==
- Hugh O'Neill Hencken (1902–1981) American; Iron Age Europe
- Kenneth Oakley (1911–1981) English; fluorine dating, exposed Piltdown Man hoax
- Jérémie Jacques Oberlin (1735–1806) Alsatian; Biblical archaeology, philology
- Alexandru Odobescu (1834–1895) Romanian; history of archaeology
- Neil Oliver (born 1967) Scottish; popularizer and television presenter: northern Europe
- Akinwumi Ogundiran (born 1966); Nigerian-American archaeologist; Yoruba people; African studies
- Katsuhiko Ohnuma (born 1944) Japanese, Lithic expert, flintknapper, prehistorian, (Syria, Iraq, Iran)
- Bjørnar Olsen (born 1958) Norwegian; theory, material culture, Arctic
- John W. Olsen (born 1955) American; prehistory, Paleolithic, Central Asia
- Stanley John Olsen (1919–2003) American; historical archaeology and zooarchaeology
- Jocelyn Orchard (1936–2019) British Trinidadian; Near Eastern archaeology, Oman
- Marthe Oulié (1901–1941) French; Crete
- Tahsin Özgüç (1916–2005) Turkish; Assyria

== P ==
- Athanasios Papageorgiou (1931–2022) Greek Cypriot; Cyprus
- Senarath Paranavithana (1896–1972) Sri Lankan; Sri Lanka, Archeological Commissioner in 1940
- Sarah Parcak (born 1972) American; Egypt, remote sensing
- Bertha Parker (1907–1978) Abenaki, Seneca; Southwest US archaeology and ethnology
- Barbara Parker-Mallowan (1908–1993) English; Assyriology, epigraphy
- André Parrot (1901–1980) French; ancient Near East
- Hermann Parzinger (born 1959) German; Scythians
- Vasile Pârvan (1882–1927) Romanian; classical archaeology (Hitria)
- Timothy Pauketat (born 1961) American; Mississippian culture, Medieval studies
- Deborah M. Pearsall (born 1950) American; paleo-ethnobotany (phytoliths)
- Mike Parker Pearson (born 1957) English; Neolithic British Isles, archaeology of death and burial
- Richard J. Pearson (born 1938) Canadian; Pacific
- Pei Wenzhong (1904–1982) Chinese; China
- William Pengelly (1812–1894) British; England, paleolithic
- Francis Penrose (1817–1903) British; classical
- George H. Pepper (1873–1924) American; Southwest USA, Nacoochee Mound (Georgia)
- Peter N. Peregrine (born 1963) American; Mississippian culture, cross-cultural studies
- Gregory Perino (1914–2005) American; Woodland, and Mississippian cultures in Illinois and Oklahoma
- John Shae Perring (1813–1869) British; Egyptian pyramids
- Hilda Petrie (1871–1957) British; Egyptology
- William Matthew Flinders Petrie (1853–1942) British; Egypt, methodology, ceramic typology
- Stewart Perowne (1901–1989) British; Imadia and Beihan
- Alejandro Peschard Fernández (born 19??) Mexican; Meso-America
- Philip Phillips (1900–1994) American; theory, eastern and central United States
- Alexandre Piankoff (1897–1966) Russian; Egypt
- Stuart Piggott (1910–1996) British; neolithic, Europe (especially Britain)
- John Pinkerton (1758–1826) Scottish; theory of Gothic superiority, Scottish proto-history
- Philip Piper (born 1966) British–Australian; zooarchaeology and palaeoecology of Southeast Asia
- Dolores Piperno (born 1949) American; archaeobotany, maize, Panama
- Augustus Pitt Rivers (1827–1900) British; Britain (especially Dorset), method
- Kyriakos Pittakis (1798–1863) Greek; Greece
- Nikolaos Platon (1909–1992) Greek; Minoan Crete
- Augustus Le Plongeon (1825–1908) British-American; photographer and antiquarian specializing in Pre-Columbian high cultures
- Ina Plug (born 1941) South African; archaeozoology
- Aleks Pluskowski (born 19??) environmental archaeology; medieval Europe
- Antoine Poidebard (1878–1955) French; aerial archaeology, Middle East, landscape archaeology
- Natalia Polosmak (born 1956) Russian; Siberia: Altay: Pazyryk culture
- Cristian Popa (born 19??) Romanian; Coţofeni culture
- Rachel Pope (born 19??) British; Iron Age Europe
- Reginald Stuart Poole (1832–1895) English; Egypt (hieroglyphics and numismatics)
- Gregory Possehl (1941–2011) American; South Asia, Indus Valley Civilization
- Timothy W. Potter (1944–2000) British; Classical archaeology
- Timothy Potts (born 1958) Australian; Middle East and Mediterranean
- Aris Poulianos (1924–2021) Greek; paleoathropology in Greece (Petralona skull)
- Gary Presland (born 19??) Australian; Aboriginal landscapes in Victoria
- Tatiana Proskouriakoff (1909–1985) Russian-American; Mayan hieroglyphs
- Francis Pryor (born 1945) British; Bronze (Flag Fen, England) and Iron Ages

== Q ==
- Jules Etienne Joseph Quicherat (1814–1882) French; ancient Europe

== R ==
- Wulf Raeck (born 1950) German; classical archaeology, Pergamon, Greek barbarian portrayals
- Philip Rahtz (1921–2011) British; United Kingdom
- José Ramos Muñoz (born 19??) Spanish; Europe, northern Africa
- Sir Andrew Ramsay (1814–1891) Scottish; Pleistocene geology, stratigraphy
- Sir William Mitchell Ramsay (1851–1939) Scottish; Asia Minor and New Testament
- Don Ranson (born 19??) Australian; Tasmanian prehistory Kutikina Cave
- Claude Rapin (born 19??) French?; Central Asia
- Charles Rau (1826–1887) American; curator at the Smithsonian
- Katharina C. Rebay (born 1977) Austrian; Bronze & Iron Age Central Europe, mortuary analysis, gender
- William Rathje (1945–2012) American; early civilizations, modern material culture studies, Mesoamerica
- Shereen F. Ratnagar (1944–2026) Indian; Indus Valley civilization
- Desire Raoul Rochette (1790–1854) French; Greece
- Jean Gaspard Felix Ravaisson-Mollien (1813–1900) French; Classical sculpture
- Marion Rawson (1899–1980) American; classical archaeology
- Shahrokh Razmjou (born 19??) Iranian; Achaemenid Archaeology
- Nicholas Reeves (born 1956) British; Egypt
- Ronny Reich (born 1947) Israeli; Jerusalem
- Maria Reiche Grosse-Neumann (1903–1998) Peruvian; Nazca lines
- George Reisner (1867–1942) American; Ancient Egypt, Nubia, Palestine
- Colin Renfrew (1937–2024) English; history of language, archaeogenetics
- Caspar Reuvens (1793–1835) Dutch; Roman archaeology in the Netherlands
- Andrew Reynolds (born 19??) English; Medieval archaeology
- Julian C. Richards (born 1951) English; Stonehenge, popularizer
- Julian D. Richards (born 19??), British; Anglo-Saxons, Viking Age
- Emil Ritterling (1861–1928) German; archaeology
- Uzma Z. Rizvi (born 1973) American; Classical and Near Eastern Archaeology
- Roland W. Robbins (1908–1987) American; New England archaeology
- Anne Strachan Robertson (1910–1997) Scottish; Numismatics
- Derek Roe (1937–2014) British; paleolithic
- Wil Roebroeks (born 1955) Dutch; The Netherlands
- Malcolm J. Rogers (1890–1960) American; California
- John Romer (born 1941) British; Egypt, popularizer
- Michael Rostovtzeff (1870–1952) Ukrainian/Russian/American; Greece, Thrace, southern Russia
- Irving Rouse (1913–2006) American; Caribbean and migration
- Katherine Routledge (1866–1935) British; Easter Island
- John Howland Rowe (1918–2004) American; Peru
- Valentine Roux (born 1956) French; ceramic production in the Levant
- Peter Rowley-Conwy (born 1951) British; environmental archaeology
- Martin Rundkvist (born 1972) Swedish; Bronze, Iron, and Middle Ages of Scandinavia.
- Adrian Andrei Rusu (born 1951) Romanian; Medieval archaeology, researcher at the Institute of Archaeology and Art History in Cluj-Napoca
- Simon Rutar (1851–1903) Slovenian; Slovenia
- Alberto Ruz Lhuillier (1906–1979) Mexican; Pre-Columbian Meso-America
- Donald P. Ryan (born 1957) American; Egypt (Valley of the Kings)

== S ==
- Jeremy Sabloff (born 1944) American; Maya
- Sadeq, Moain (Mohammedmoin) (born 1955) Palestinian; Palestine and the Gulf region
- Saad Abbas Ismail (born 1980) Kurdish; International archaeologist, Syria
- Antonio Sagona (1956–2017); Australian; Near East, Caucasus
- Sharada Srinivasan (born 1966) Indian; archaeometallurgy, India
- Roderick Salisbury (born 1967) American; ideology, soil chemistry, GIS, S.E. Europe (Neolithic)
- William T. Sanders (1926–2008) American; Mesoamerica
- Viktor Sarianidi (1929–2013) Uzbekistani; Bronze Age, Central Asia
- William Saturno (born 19??) American; Mayan site San Bartolo
- Otto Schaden (1937–2015) American; Egypt
- Claude Schaeffer (1898–1982) French; Ugarit
- Michael Brian Schiffer (born 1947) American (born in Canada); behavioural archaeology, method and theory
- Heinrich Schliemann (1822–1890) German; Troy, Mycenae, Tiryn
- Philippe-Charles Schmerling (1790–1836) Belgian; founder of paleontology: antiquity of man
- Klaus Schmidt (1953–2014) German; Göbekli Tepe, Turkey
- Alain Schnapp (born 1946) French; Classical archaeology: iconography of Greek vases
- Carmel Schrire (born 1941) Australian; Australia, South Africa
- Francesco Scipone (1675–1755) Italian; Etruscans
- Leslie Scott (1913–1970) British; UK, France, Italy, possibly Iraq
- Assaad Seif (born 1967) Lebanese; archaeology of Lebanon
- Mercy Seiradaki (1910–1993) English; Knossos
- Ovid R. Sellers (1884–1975) American; Biblical Old Testament
- Gemma Sena Chiesa (1929–2024) Italian; Roman
- Jean Baptiste Louis George Seroux D'Agincourt (1730–1814) French; ancient monumental art
- Veronica Seton-Williams (1910–1992) Australian; Egyptology and prehistory, Near East
- Thomas Sever (born 19??) American?; NASA’s only archaeologist, Maya, South America
- Ruth Shady (born 1946) Peruivan; Peru
- Alireza Shapour Shahbazi (1942–2006) Iranian; Iran
- Michael Shanks (born 1959) English; Classical archaeology, theory
- Thurstan Shaw (1914–2013) English; Africa (especially Nigeria)
- Anna Shepard (1903–1971) American; ceramic analysis
- Alison Sheridan (19??) British; Bronze and Neolithic ages
- Andrew Sherratt (1946–2006) English; prehistory
- Susan Sherratt (born 1949) U.K. citizenship; Mediterranean archaeology
- Yoko Shindo (1960–2018), Japanese; Islamic glass
- Bong-geun Sim (born 1943) South Korean; Korea
- Elizabeth Simpson (born 1947) American; Ancient Near East, Anatolia
- Frederic Slater (c. 1880–1947) Australian; Aboriginal place names
- Claire Smith (born 1957) Australian; Indigenous archaeology, rock art
- Grafton Elliot Smith (1871–1937) Australian; (anatomist) hyperdiffusionist view of prehistory
- Mike Smith (1955–2022) Australian, Central Australia
- William Robertson Smith (1846–1894) Scottish; Orientalist, Biblical scholar
- Stanley South (1928–2016) American; historical archaeology
- Janet D. Spector (1944–2011) American; North America
- Sarah Speight (born 19??) British; castle studies and medieval archaeology
- E. Lee Spence (born 1947) American; marine archaeology
- Dirk HR Spennemann (born 19??) Australian; futures studies
- Victor Spinei (born 1943) Romanian; medieval cult objects
- Flaxman Charles John Spurrell (1842–1915) English; prehistoric England, Egypt
- Frederick Spurrell (1824–1902) English; English archaeology (Essex and Sussex)
- Dragoslav Srejović (1931–1996) Serbian; Mesolithic Iron Gates culture of the Balkans: Lepenski Vir
- Lady Hester Stanhope (1776–1839) British; Ashkelon
- John Steane (1931–2024) British; historic landscape
- Julie K. Stein, (born 19??) American; geoarchaeology and archaeology of shell middens and coastal archaeological sites
- Eunice Stebbens (1893–1992) American; Roman coins
- Louise Steel (born 19??) British; prehistoric Cyprus
- Paulette Steeves (born 1955) Canadian, Cree, Métis; decolonizing archaeology, Paleo-Indians
- Marc Aurel Stein (1862–1943) Hungarian; Central Asia
- Margareta Steinby (born 1938) Finnish; classical archaeology
- Hans-Georg Stephan (born 1950) German; Medievalist, post-Medieval archaeology, landscape archaeology, oven tiles
- Sara Yorke Stevenson (1847–1921) American; Egypt
- Marion Stirling Pugh (1911–2001) American; Mesopotamian archaeology
- James B. Stoltman (1935–2019) American; ceramic analysis, Great Lakes (North America)
- James R. Stewart (1913–1962) Australian; Cyprus and the Ancient Near East
- Joseph Stevens (archaeologist) (1818–1899) British; first curator of Reading Museum
- Sharon Stocker (born 19??) American; ancient Greece (especially the Griffin Warrior Tomb)
- Eugene Stockton (born 1934) Australian; Middle East, Australia
- William Duncan Strong (1899–1962) American; Peru, U.S. Mid-West, California, Honduras, seriation statistics
- Stuart Struever (1931–2022) American; Koster site (Illinois), flotation, "large-scale, public-oriented archaeology"
- David Stuart (born 1965) American; Mayan epigraphy
- George E. Stuart (1935–2014) American; Mayan archaeology
- Su Bai (1922–2018) Chinese; Chinese Buddhism, grottoes
- Su Bingqi (1909–1997) Chinese; ancient China
- Eleazar Sukenik (1889–1953) Israeli; Dead Sea scrolls
- Sharon Sullivan, Australian heritage conservation
- Pál Sümegi (born 1960) Hungarian; environmental archaeology, Hungary
- Glenn Summerhayes (born 1954) Australian; East Asia and Pacific archaeology, trade and exchange, development of social complexity, archaeometry
- Tim Sutherland (born 1958) English; Conflict and Battlefield Archaeology
- Rachel Swallow (born 19??) British?; medieval archaeology, landscape archaeology, and castle studies
- Naomi Sykes (born 19??) British?; zooarchaeology
- Jadwiga Szeptycka (1883–1939) Polish; Roman-period Poland

== T ==
- Takaku Kenji (born 19??) Japanese; Korea
- Hamdan Taha (b. 19??) Palestinian; archaeology of Palestine
- Aarne Michaël Tallgren (1885–1945) Finnish; East European Bronze Age and the Early Iron Age
- Zemaryalai Tarzi (1939–2024) Afghan; Afghanistan
- Joan du Plat Taylor (1906–1983) Scottish; maritime archaeology, Cyprus
- Joan J. Taylor (1940–2019) American; British prehistory
- Walter Willard Taylor, Jr. (1913–1997) American; theory, Coahuila (Mexico)
- Julio C. Tello (1880–1947) Peruvian; Peru
- Petros Themelis (1936–2023) Greek; Messene
- Alexander Thom (1894–1985) Scottish; engineer, Stonehenge
- Charles Thomas (1928–2016) British; Cornish studies
- David Hurst Thomas (born 1945) American; Spanish Borderlands, repatriation
- Julian Thomas (born 1959) British; north-west European Neolithic and Bronze Age
- Dorothy Burr Thompson (1900–2001) American; Hellenistic terracotta figurines
- Homer Thompson (1906–2000) Canadian; Greece
- John Arthur Thompson (1913–2002) Australian; Old Testament scholar and biblical archaeologist
- J. Eric S. Thompson (1898–1975) English; Maya
- Christian Jürgensen Thomsen (1788–1865) Danish; originator of the Three-Age System
- Alan Thorne (1939–2012) Australian; Aboriginal Australian origins and the human genome, Lake Mungo, Kow Swamp
- Carl L. Thunberg (born 1963) Swedish; Viking Age, Nordic Middle Ages
- Christopher Tilley (1955–2024) British; theory, Britain
- Norman Tindale (1900–1993) Australian; mapping Australian tribes
- Tong Enzheng (1935–1997) Chinese; China
- Malcolm Todd (1939–2013) British; classical archaeology
- Alfred Marston Tozzer (1877–1954) American; Mesoamerica (Maya)
- Arthur Dale Trendall (1909–1995) Australian; Greek ceramics at Apulia
- John C. Trever (1916–2006) American; Biblical archaeologist
- Bruce Trigger (1937–2006) Canadian; archaeological theory, comparative civilizations, Huronia, Nubia, Egyptology
- Christos Tsountas (1857–1934) Greek; Greece
- Olena Vasylivna Tsvek (1931–2020) Ukrainian; Trypillia culture
- James Tuck (1940–2019) American; eastern Canadian historical archaeology
- Ronald F. Tylecote (1916–1990) British; founder of archaeometallurgy
- Grigore Tocilescu (1850–1909) Romanian; Dacia
- Henrieta Todorova (1933–2015) Bulgarian; Neolithic Bulgaria, excavations at Durankulak
- Vassilios Tzaferis (1936–2015) Greek–Israeli; biblical archaeology, Byzantine monasticism

== U ==
- Peter Ucko (1938–2007) British; Paleolithic art; archaeological politics
- Luigi Maria Ugolini (1895–1936) Italian; Albania
- Gary Urton (born 1948) American; Andes
- David Ussishkin (born 1935) Israeli; Lachish, Jezreel Valley and Megiddo
- Fadel al-Utol (born 1981) Palestinian; archaeology of the Gaza Strip

== V ==
- Laima Vaitkunskienė (born 1936) Lithuanian; Medieval Lithuania
- Heiki Valk (born 1959) Estonian; Medieval Estonia
- Ron Vanderwal (1938–2021), Australian; Torres Strait, New Guinea
- Parviz Varjavand (1934–2007) Iranian; ancient Iran (Persia)
- Peter van Dommelen (born 1966), Dutch; Western Mediterranean and Phoenician-Punic archaeology
- William Jones Varley (1904–1976) British; English Iron Age hill forts
- Miloje Vasić (1869–1956) Serbian; Neolithic archaeological culture: Vinča culture
- Roland de Vaux (1903–1971) French; Biblical archaeology: Dead-Sea Scrolls
- Marius Vazeilles (1881–1973) French; Gallo-Roman archaeology, Merovingian archaeology
- Bruce Veitch (1957–2005) Australian; Mitchell Plateau and Pilbara Western Australia; Bruce Veitch Award
- Alan Vince (1952–2009) British; British ceramics
- Zdenko Vinski (1913–1996) Croatian; Croatia
- Rudolf Virchow (1821–1902) German; Pomeranian hill-forts
- Dominique Vivant Denon (1747–1827) French; Egyptian art
- Ida von Boxberg (1806–1893), German archaeologist
- Alexandru Vulpe (1931–2016) Romanian; Hallstatt

== W ==
- Alan Wace (1879–1957) English; Greece (especially Mycenae
- Marc Waelkens (1948–2021) Belgian; Turkish archaeology
- Tony Waldron (died 2021) British; palaeopathologist and palaeoepidemiologist
- Alice Leslie Walker (1885–1954) American, classical archaeologist
- Andrew Frederic Wallace-Hadrill (born 1951) British, classical archaeologist (Pompeii)
- Lynley A. Wallis (born 19??) Australian; Indigenous and historical archaeology
- Wang Tao (archaeologist) (born 1962) Chinese-British; Chinese archaeology
- Wang Zhongshu (1925–2015) Chinese; Chinese and Japanese archaeology
- Graeme K. Ward (born 1943) Australian; Polynesia, Melanesia, Micronesia, Australia; prehistoric archaeology, research funding and administration, rock art
- John Bryan Ward-Perkins (1912–1981) British; architectural history
- Charles Warren (1840–1927) British; engineer, police commissioner and Biblical archaeologist
- Helen Waterhouse (1913–1999) British; classical archaeology
- Michael R. Waters (born 19??) American; geoarchaeology, early Americans
- William Thompson Watkin (1836–1888), British; Roman Britain
- Trevor Watkins (born 19??) British; Near Eastern archaeology
- Patty Jo Watson (1932–2024) American; North American archaeology
- Clarence H. Webb (1902–1991) American; southern United States prehistory
- Robert Wauchope (1909–1979) American; Maya, south-eastern U.S.
- Karl Jakob Weber (1712–1764) Swiss; Pompeii
- Mildred Mott Wedel (1912–1995) American; Great Plains prehistory
- Waldo Wedel (1908–1996) American; Great Plains prehistory
- Josef W. Wegner (born 1967) American; Egyptology
- Elizabeth Weiss (born 19??) American; skeletal analysis, archaeological ethics
- Friedrich Gottlieb Welcker (1784–1868) German; philologist and archaeologist specializing in Greece
- Fred Wendorf (1924–2015) American; archaeology and cultural development of arid environments
- David Wengrow (born 1972) English; comparative archaeology
- Boyd Wettlaufer (1914–2009) Canadian; Father of Saskatchewan Archaeology
- Mortimer Wheeler (1890–1976) British; method, South Asia (especially the early Indus Valley), Maiden Castle (England)
- Tessa Verney Wheeler (1893–1936) British; method, British archaeology, co-founder of Institute of Archaeology
- Joyce White (born 19??) American; prehistoric Southeast Asia
- Theodore E. White (1905–1977) American; archaeozoology
- Elizabeth Augustus Whitehead (1928–1983) American; classical archaeology
- John C. Whittaker (born 1953) American; experimental archaeology, Palaeolithic
- Alasdair Whittle (born 1949) British; European Neolithic
- Caroline Wickham-Jones (1955–2022) British; Orkney, mesolithic, submerged sites
- Theodor Wiegand (1864–1936) German; Pergamum, aerial photography
- Malcolm H. Wiener (born 1935) American; Aegeanist, Prehistorian, President of INSTAP
- Louise van Wijngaarden-Bakker (1940–2021) Dutch; archaeozoology
- Gordon Willey (1913–2002) American; New World, method and theory
- Audrey Williams (1902-1978)
- Stephen Williams (1926–2017) American; North America
- Hugh Willmott (born 1972) British; Middle Ages and monastic archaeology
- Daniel Wilson (1816–1892) Scottish; Scotland, theory
- Johann Joachim Winckelmann (1717–1768) German; Hellenist art, Greek world
- Christopher Witmore (born 1974) American; Archaeological theory, landscape archaeology, object-oriented approaches
- Bryant G. Wood (born 1936) American; Palestine
- Peter Woodman (1943–2017), Irish; Irish Mesolithic
- Leonard Woolley (1880–1960) British; Ur in Mesopotamia
- Hannah Wormington (1914–1994) American; American Southwest and Paleo-Indians
- Jens Jacob Asmussen Worsaae (1821–1885) Danish; paleobotanist, archaeologist, historian and politician, first to excavate and use stratigraphy to prove the Three-age system
- George Roy Haslam (Mick) Wright (1924–2014) Australian; Middle East
- Wolfgang W. Wurster (1937–2003) German; architectural history; Mediterranean, high cultures of Peru and Ecuador
- Alison Wylie (born 1954) Canadian; philosophy of archaeology
- John Wymer (1928–2006) British; Paleolithic

== X ==
- Xia Nai (1910–1985) Chinese; China
- Xu Xusheng (1888–1976) Chinese; discoverer of the Erlitou culture

== Y ==
- Yigael Yadin (1917–1984) Israeli; Masada, Hazor
- Yang Jianhua (born 1955) Chinese; Mesopotamia, eastern Eurasia
- Yusra (20th century) Palestinian; Tabun, Neanderthals

== Z ==
- Inger Zachrisson (born 1936); Swedish; Sami people since the Iron Age
- Louise Zarmati (born 1958) Australian; Archaeology in schools; women in archaeology; Australia, Crete, Cyprus
- Melinda A. Zeder (born ca. 1952) American; zooarchaeology
- Robert N. Zeitlin (born 1935) American; Mesoamerica (Zapotec), ancient political economies
- Zhao Kangmin (1936–2018) Chinese; discoverer of the Terracotta Army
- Zheng Zhenduo (1898–1958) Chinese; China
- Zheng Zhenxiang (1929–2024) Chinese; discoverer of the Tomb of Fu Hao
- Irit Ziffer (born 1954) Israeli; symbols in ancient art
- Andreas Zimmermann (born 1951) German; Neolithic (LBK)
- Ezra B. W. Zubrow (born 1945) American; theory, GIS, demography, ecology, Circumpolar
- R. Tom Zuidema (1927–2016) Dutch; Incas
- Vladas Žulkus (born 1945) Lithuanian; Lithuania (Klaipėda, underwater archaeology)
- Marek Zvelebil (1952–2011) Czech; European Stone Age

== See also ==
- List of Russian archaeologists
