= Louise Zarmati =

Australian archaeologist, educator, and author

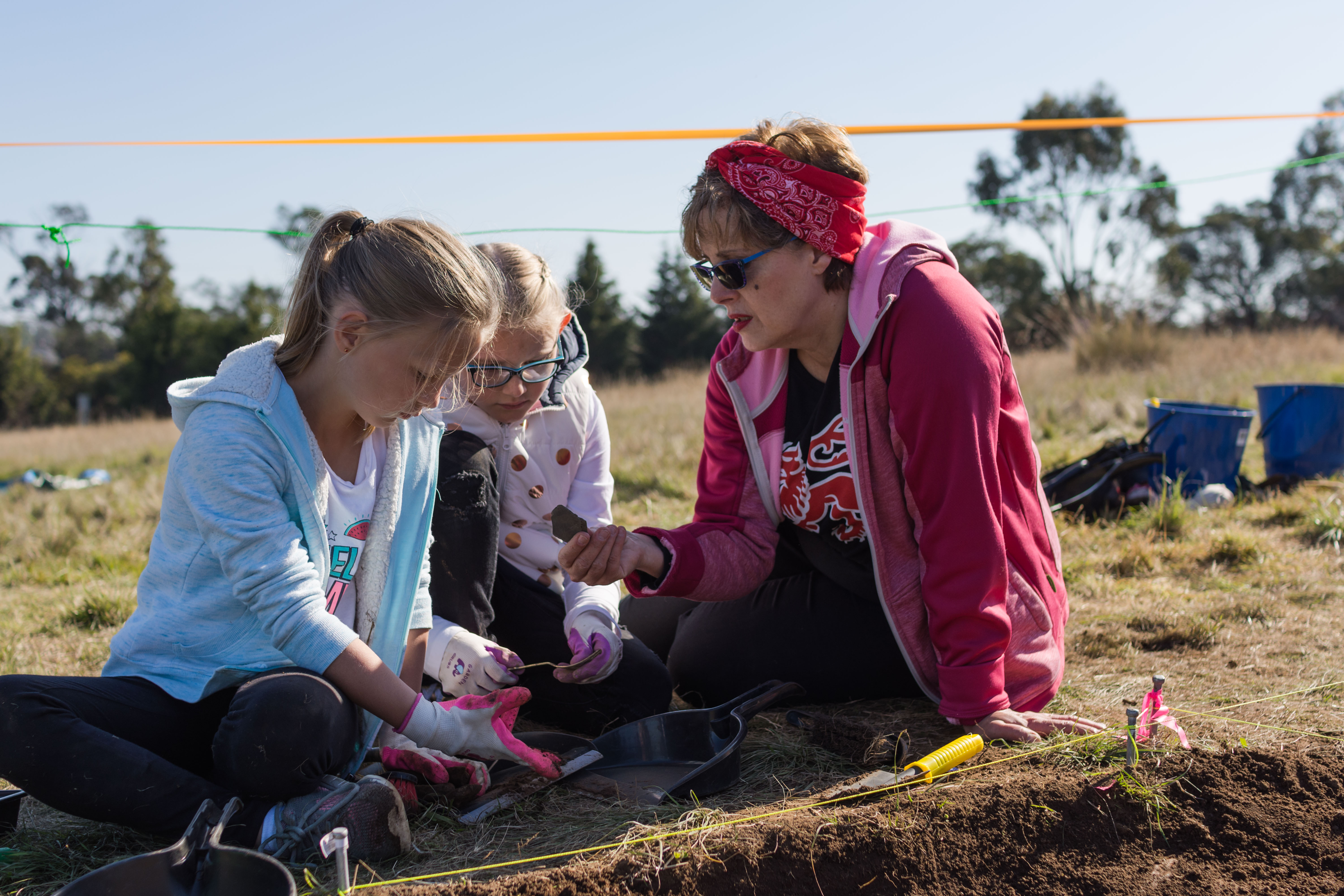
- Zarmati on a site
- Born: 8 August 1958 (age 68); Sydney, Australia
- Education: University of Sydney, Australia
- Awards: Winston Churchill Memorial Trust Fellowship 2012, National Trust (NSW) Heritage 2011, Philip Brown Award 2010
- Scientific career
- Fields: Archaeology
- Workplaces: University of Tasmania
- Doctoral advisor: Dr Linda Young

Louise Zarmati is an Australian archaeologist, educator, and author. She is most notable for pioneering Archaeology education in schools in Australia.

== Education ==
In 1979, Zarmati received her Bachelors and Diploma of Education from the University of Sydney. She resumed her studies in 1992, earning her Masters in Archaeology from the University of Cambridge. Deakin University awarded Zarmati a PhD for her research on the history of pedagogy in Australian museums in 2012.

== Career ==
Zarmati began her career as an English and history teacher at secondary schools. After five years she pursued a career in archaeology. She first began as a volunteer at Tel Dor in Israel in 1988. In 1990, she became a database designer for the Kavousi Project in Crete. During that time, she was an active member of the Women in Archaeology research group.

1993 brought her back to Australia, where she worked on the Sydney Cyprus Survey Project and the Dawes Point Archaeological Excavation. She returned to teaching in 1996, and during that time she wrote several archaeology textbooks. In addition to her textbooks, she also created programs for children to get involved with archaeology; for instance, on a site at Kerry Lodge.

In 2013, she returned to archaeology digs alongside Heather Burke. She now works as a lecturer in Humanities and Social Sciences at the University of Tasmania.

Zarmati has written on feminist theory and archaeology.

She was also one of the writers of the Australian Curriculum for history.

== Select publications ==
- Zarmati, Louise (2017). "'Pompeii-mania' in schools Down Under". Journal of Public Archaeology. 1 (1): 1–9. doi:10.23821/2017_3a. ISSN 2532-3512.
- Zarmati, Louise (2015). "Using archaeology to teach Australia's 'difficult' indigenous past". Conservation and Management of Archaeological Sites. 17: 91–106. doi:10.1179/1350503315Z.00000000096. ISSN 1350-5033. S2CID 109631613.
- Zarmati, Louise (2015). "Archaeology as pedagogy at Sydney's 'The Big Dig'". The Historic Environment. 6 (2): 177–191. doi:10.1179/1756750515Z.00000000082. ISSN 1756-7505. S2CID 111690629.
- Zarmati, Louise (2015). "Echoes from the past: Oral history in the National Museum of Australia". MuseumEdu. 2: 53–62. ISSN 2408-0748.
- Zarmati, Louise (2009). Heinemann ancient and medieval history : Pompeii and Herculaneum (2nd ed.). Port Melbourne: Pearson Australia. ISBN 9781740811958. OCLC 799794621.
- Kiem, Paul; Smithson, Michael; Zarmati, Louise (2004). Old worlds new worlds : stage 4 world history. Sydney, Melbourne: Pearson Longman. ISBN 978-0123600073. OCLC 1057975911.
- Zarmati, Louise; Cremin, Aedeen (2004). Heinemann ancient and medieval history : archaeology. Port Melbourne, Victoria: Harcourt Education. ISBN 978-1740811910. OCLC 156860171.
- Kiem, Paul; Zarmati, Louise; Smithson, Michael (2000–2001). Studies in history. South Melbourne: Addison Wesley Longman. ISBN 9780733924026. OCLC 223275815.
- Cremin, Aedeen; Zarmati, Louise (1998). Experience archaeology. Cambridge; Melbourne: Cambridge University Press. ISBN 978-0521571746. OCLC 881158235.
