= Zakrisson =

Zakrisson is a surname. Notable people with the surname include:

- Anna Zakrisson (born 1980), Swedish science communicator and scientist
- Kristina Zakrisson (born 1956), Swedish politician

== See also ==
- Zachrisson
