= Niculae =

Niculae is a Romanian given name and surname. Notable people with it include:

== Given name ==
- Niculae Cocea (1880–1949), Romanian journalist, novelist, critic and left-wing political activist
- Niculae-Cornel Crăciun (born 1925), Romanian Nordic skier
- Niculae Conovici (1948–2005, Bucharest), Romanian archeologist, amphorologist and numismat
- Niculae Flocea (born 1987), Romanian sprint canoer
- Niculae Fulgeanu (born 1971), Romanian former water polo player
- Nicolae I. Herescu (1906–1961), Romanian classical scholar, essayist, translator and poet
- Niculae M. Popescu (1881–1963), Romanian theologian, historian and priest of the Romanian Orthodox Church
- Niculae Nedeff (1928–2017), Romanian handballer
- Nicolae Pătrașcu (ca. 1580–late 1627), Rulers of Wallachia
- Niculae Zamfir (born 1958), Romanian wrestler

== Surname ==
- Constantin Niculae (born 1955), Romanian judoka
- Daniel Niculae (born 1982), Romanian Footballer
- Ioan Niculae (born 1954), Romanian businessman and entrepreneur
- Marius Niculae (born 1981), Romanian footballer
