= Zachrisson =

Zachrisson is a surname. Notable people with the surname include:

- Inger Zachrisson (born 1936), Swedish archaeologist
- Julio Zachrisson (1930–2021), Panamanian printmaker
- Li Zachrisson (born 1986), Swedish singer known professionally as Lykke Li
- Mattias Zachrisson (born 1990), Swedish handball player
- Robert Eugen Zachrisson (1880–1937), Swedish philologist
- Vendela Zachrisson (born 1978), Swedish sailor
