= Keneiloe Molopyane =

Archaeologist from South Africa (born 1987)

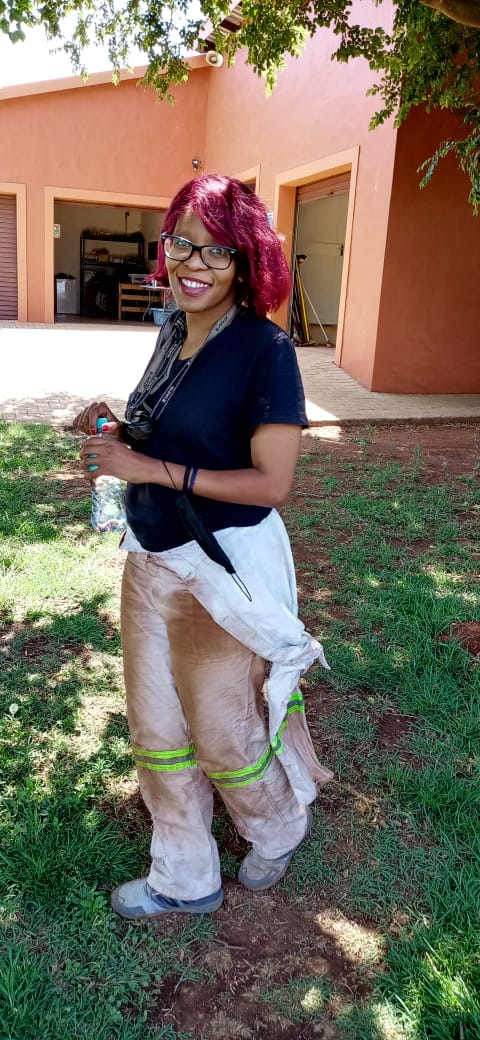
Keneiloe Molopyane

Keneiloe Molopyane (born in 1987 in Benoni) is a South African biological archaeologist and paleoanthropologist.

Described as “just a girl from Benoni”, Molopyane has done the impossible, from day dreaming at her school desk to becoming a chapter in school biology textbook. In 2023 she was lead excavator at Rising Star Cave and is a researcher at Centre for Exploration of the Deep Human Journey at the University of the Witwatersrand. She was named an "emerging explorer" by the National Geographic Society and an invited member of 50 Club Explorers. In 2025, Molopyane became a member of the Royal Society of Science, South Africa.

== Biography ==
Inspired by watching an episode of Tintin with an archaeology theme on television when she was seven years old, Molopyane began studying archaeology at the University of Pretoria, and later completed a master's degree in archaeobiology at the University of York. In 2021 she completed a doctoral thesis in biological anthropology at University of the Witwatersrand.

As of 2021, Molopyane was inducted into the National Geographic Society as an Emerging Explorer. She has led expeditions at Gladysvale Cave, and in 2023 she was lead excavator at Rising Star Cave and is a researcher at Centre for Exploration of the Deep Human Journey at the University of the Witwatersrand. Associated with the university, Wits University, she is currently the Principal Investigator at Gladysvale Cave, the first black South African woman to hold this title, analysing the fossil assemblage. In 2022 she brought contestants for Miss South Africa to Gladysvale to educate them about South African archaeology and its impact on how we understand early human evolution.

Molopyane’s breakout into mainstream media came off the back of the Netflix show, Unknown: Cave of Bones. A documentary episode following the discovery of Homo Naledi, South Africa. In 2022, Molopyane appeared alongside Hazen Audel, for the promotion of the tv show, Primal Survivor. In 2024 she also appeared on stage with Masa Kekana at the National Geographic Society, Endurence, television show.

== Recognition ==
In 2021, Molopyane was named an "emerging explorer" by the National Geographic Society. In 2023 she became an invited member of 50 Club Explorers. She is the inspiration for a character named 'Bones' in a comic book series Super Scientist. As a woman of colour she has pioneered representation in archaeology in South Africa, by being the first woman of colour to hold the role of Principal Investigator at Gladysvale Cave.

In 2025, Molopyane became a member of the Royal Society of Science, South Africa.

== See also ==
- List of archaeologists
