= Giuseppe Maggi =

Italian archaeologist (1930–2025)

- Born: 1930
- Died: August 2025 (aged 95); Naples, Italy
- Occupation: Archaeologist

Giuseppe "Peppino" Maggi (1930 – August 2025) was an Italian archaeologist. He specialised in Vesuvian archaeology.

== Life and career ==
Giuseppe Maggi studied under the famous archaeologist Amedeo Maiuri. He later served as director of the National Archaeological Museum of Naples. He was involved in the excavation of Herculaneum, which was destroyed in the eruption of Mount Vesuvius in 79 AD. The town was completely buried and not rediscovered until centuries later. In 1982, Maggi was in charge of the excavation operation. Such artefacts recovered included the largest collection of skeletons from the Roman period ever discovered.

Maggi died at his home in Naples, in August 2025, at the age of 95.

== See also ==
- List of archaeologists
