= Who's Been Sleeping in My House? =

- Genre: factual
- Presented by: Adam Ford
- Country of origin: Australia
- Original language: English
- No. of series: 2

Production
- Producers: Jacqueline Willinge, Anthony Willinge
- Running time: 60 minutes
- Production companies: joined up films, in association with ABC and W.

Original release
- Network: ABC1
- Release: 21 November 2011 – 19 April 2013

Who's Been Sleeping in My House? is an Australian factual television series aired on ABC1 on 21 November 2011, it is produced by joined up films, in association with the ABC and ScreenWest. It's presented by professional archaeologist and researcher Adam Ford. Each episode seeks to unveil hidden stories and the history of the inhabitants that formerly resided there.
