= Dovdoin Bayar =

Mongolian archaeologist (1946–2010)

Dovdoin Bayar Довдойн Баяр
- Born: 11 May 1946; Ulan Bator, Mongolia
- Died: 10 November 2010 (aged 64)
- Spouse: Marta Buyan-Ologch
- Scientific career
- Fields: Historical study of Middle ages, Human Statues
- Institutions: Institute of Archaeology of Mongolian Academy of Science; Ulaanbaatar University

Dovdoin Bayar (Mongolian: Довдойн Баяр) (1946–2010) was a Mongolian archaeologist, historian, a corresponding member of the German Archaeological Institute, and an amateur boxer.

== Archaeology ==
Bayar started his career in archaeology under the instruction of the famous Mongolian archaeologists Namsrain Ser-Odjav and Dorjkhandyn Dorj, when he studied at Mongolian State University of Education. He obtained PhD degree in the theme of “Stone sculptures of Eastern Mongolia”, and ScD degree in the theme of “Human Statues in Mongolian territory”. He mainly studied Mongolian archaeological records, human statues, and memorials of the Middle Ages. Bayar managed and participated in about 30 field expeditions in Mongolia, such as Mongolian-Russian joint expedition, Mongolian-German “Kharkhorum” expedition, ”Studying Human Statues of East Mongolia” expedition, Mongolian-Japanese “Gurvan Gol” expedition, Mongolian-Korean “Dornod Mongol” expedition, UNESCO’s “Protecting ancient city of Kharkhorum” expedition, Mongolian-Turkish and Mongolian-Kazakhstan expedition.

Bayar wrote eight monographs, co-authored more than ten books, and published about 200 articles in scientific journals. His works were translated into and published in many countries; such as Mongolia, Russia, Japan, Korea, China, Turkey, German, Hungary, Kazakhstan, and in other countries. His main research theme was the lifestyle of nomads in the Middle Ages. His main achievement is that by his comprehensive research on the uniquely built anthropomorphic statues of Eastern Mongolia, he established that they are of indigenous origin, dated to the 13th through 14th centuries. It was a significant discovery, for before his research, all such statues were considered Turkic. Thus, he developed a new concept of Mongolian stone sculptures in Eurasian archaeological study.

Russian archaeologist Svetlana Pletneva valued his works by saying, “His research revealed the unstudied part of history, namely, the history of the nomads, which have not formed as a concept yet. He broke the long-existed view of referring all human statues to the Turkic period, and distinguished the Mongolian statues which relate to XIII–XIV century out of the Turkic statue reasonably and indisputably.” As a result of his archaeological work, 13th- to 14th-century Mongolian clothes, accessories, hair styles and appearances became better understood and were then used in the fine arts, such as in literature, stage, and screen works.

== Boxing ==
Bayar won a silver medal in the Asian Amateur Boxing Championships, held in 1971 in Tehran in Iran. He was a judge, referee and a trainer of boxing and wrote a book Boxing in Mongolia.
