= Gaetano d'Ancora =

Italian classical scholar and archeologist (1751–1816)

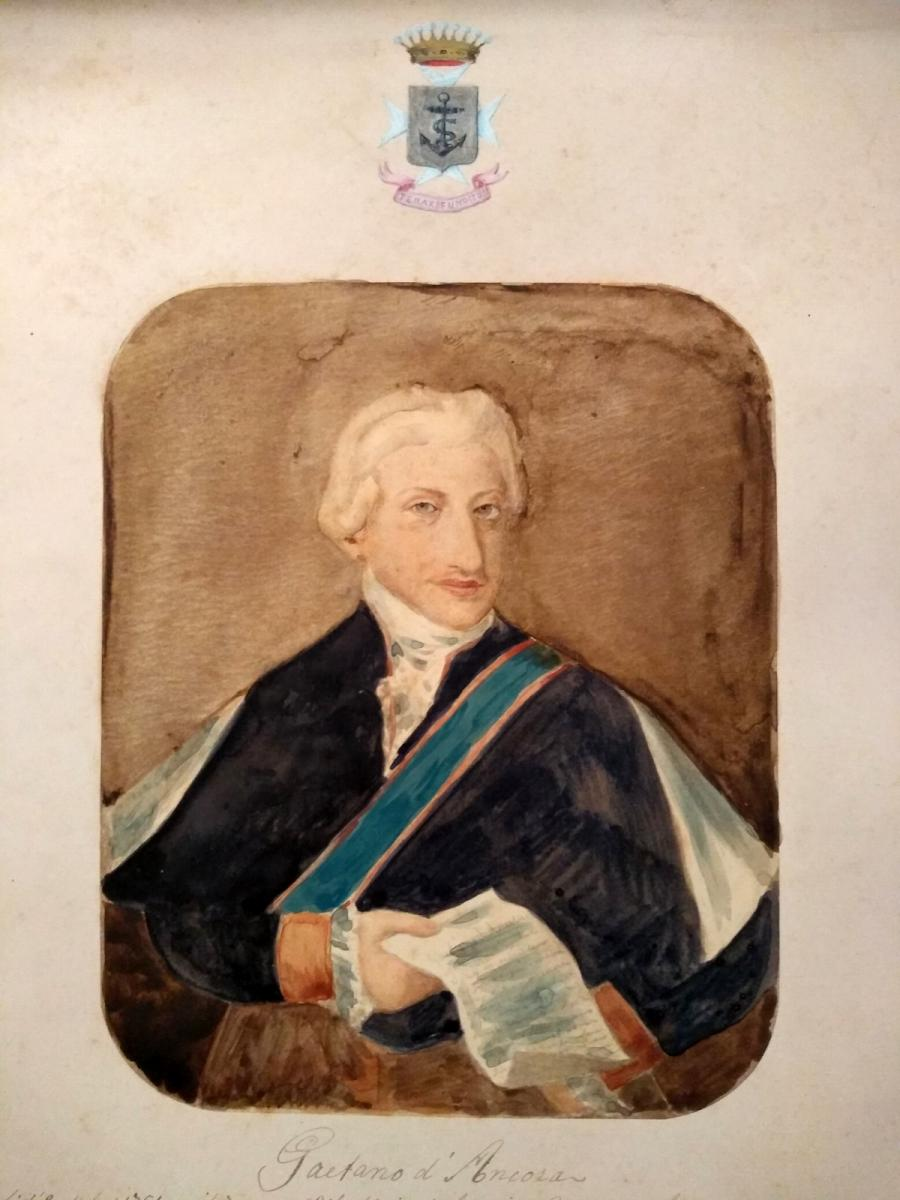
Watercolour portrait, 19th century

Gaetano d'Ancora (8 October 1751 – 7 March 1816) was an Italian classical scholar and archeologist, active near Naples.

== Biography ==
Gaetano was born in Naples and studied in Naples under Martorelli, Santoro and Campolongo. By age 18, he was teaching classical languages at the military academy in Naples. He became professor of Greek language at the University of Naples in 1799. He was well connected to other scholars across Europe and Italy. He is best known for his treatises on the excavations at Pompeii and Herculaneum. In 1794 he published a translation of Xenocratis De Alimento ex aquatilibus by Xenocrates.

== Works ==
- Memoria per l'Accademia etrusca di Cortona sulla osservanza degli antichi pel silenzio, Naples, 1782
- Saggio sull'uso dei pozzi presso gli antichi, specialmente per preservativo dei tremuoti, Napoli 1787.
- Della salutare ispirazione, Nice 1788
- Dei segni della verginità presso gli antichi, Montalbano 1790.
- Ricerche filosofico-critiche sopra alcuni fossili metallici della Calabria, Livorno 1791.
- Guida ragionata per le antichità e per le curiosità naturali di Pozzuoli, Naples 1792
- Della Economia fisica degli antichi nel costruire le città, Naples 1796
- Prospetto storico-fisico degli scavi di Pompei ed Ercolano, e dell'antico e presente stato del Vesuvio, per guida per forestieri, Napoli 1803.
- Lezioni pratiche circa l'imitazione dell'antico nell'arte del disegno, Naples 1804
- Illustrazioni del gruppo d'Ercole con la cerva scoperta in Pompei, Napoli 1805

== Bibliography ==
- Giuseppe Castaldi, Della Regale Accademia Ercolanese, Tip. Porcelli, Napoli 1840, pp. 254–255.
- Filippo de Jorio, Gaetano d'Ancora, in T.J. Mathias (a cura di), Biografia degli uomini illustri del Regno di Napoli, t. VI, Napoli 1819, pp. 45–48.
- Eugenio Ricca, La nobiltà del Regno delle Due Sicilie, vol. IV, De Pascale, Napoli 1869, pp. 775–778.
