= Roderick Salisbury =

Roderick B. Salisbury
- Born: Roderick Byron Salisbury; 19 June 1967 (age 58); Newburgh, New York, USA
- Occupation: Archaeologist

Roderick B. Salisbury (born June 19, 1967) is an American anthropological archaeologist specializing in landscape archaeology, human-environmental interactions, and the link between spatial organization and socio-political structure. Since 2015 he has worked at the Austrian Academy of Sciences and the Faculty of Historical and Cultural Studies at the University of Vienna, Austria.

== Biography ==
Salisbury earned his BA in Anthropology from Buffalo State College and his MA in Anthropology from the University of Buffalo. After holding an IGERT Fellowship in GI Science at the University at Buffalo Department of Anthropology and National Center for Geographic Information and Analysis (NCGIA) and a Fulbright Fellowship to Hungary (2007-2008), he received his PhD in Anthropology with a focus on Archaeology, and a Certificate in Geographic Information Science, both from the University of Buffalo.

After completing his PhD, Salisbury was a Research Associate and later Honorary Visiting Fellow at the University of Leicester and taught at the University of Nottingham. From 2012-2014 he held a Marie Curie Fellowship with Airborne Technologies, GmbH in Austria, and has lectured and held several post-doctoral research positions in the Faculty of Historical and Cultural Studies at the University of Vienna and the Austrian Academy of Sciences. His research interests include landscape archaeology, soilscapes, historical ecology, social organization, GIS, and geoarchaeology. Spatio-temporal interests are the Late Neolithic, Copper Age and early Bronze Age in Central and Southern Europe, and Late Archaic and Woodland periods in Northeastern North America.

In addition to research and teaching, Salisbury is co-editor of The European Archaeologist (TEA), newsletter of the European Association of Archaeologists and the monograph series Universitätsforschungen zur prähistorischen Archäologie, was Assistant Editor of the Journal of World Anthropology (2005-2008), and sits on the Advisory Board of IANSA - Interdisciplinaria Archaeologica – Natural Sciences in Archaeology.

== Books ==
- Salisbury, R.B. 2016. Soilscapes in Archaeology: Settlement and Social Organization in the Neolithic of the Great Hungarian Plain. Prehistoric Research in the Körös Region, Vol. 3. Archaeolingua, Budapest.
- Gorgues, A., Rebay-Salisbury, K. & Salisbury, R.B. (eds). 2017. Material Chains in Late Prehistoric Europe and the Mediterranean: Time, Space and Technologies of Production. Mémoires 48. Ausonius Editions, Bordeaux.
- Neubauer, W., Trinks, I., Salisbury, R.B. & Einwögerer, C. (eds). 2013. Archaeological Prospection: Proceedings of the 10th International Conference on Archaeological Prospection. Austrian Academy of Sciences, Vienna.
- Thurston, T.L. & Salisbury, R.B. (eds). 2009. Reimagining Regional Analyses – the Archaeology of Spatial and Social Dynamics. Cambridge Scholars Publishing, Newcastle.
- Salisbury, R.B. & Keeler, D.M. (eds). 2007. Space – Archaeology’s Final Frontier? An Intercontinental Approach. Cambridge Scholars Press, Newcastle.
