= Katsuhiko Ohnuma =

Japanese prehistorian and lithic expert

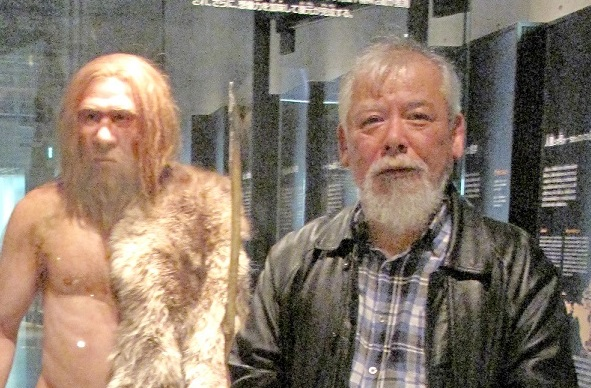
- Born: June 2, 1944 (age 82); Japan
- Education: University of London
- Occupation: archaeologist

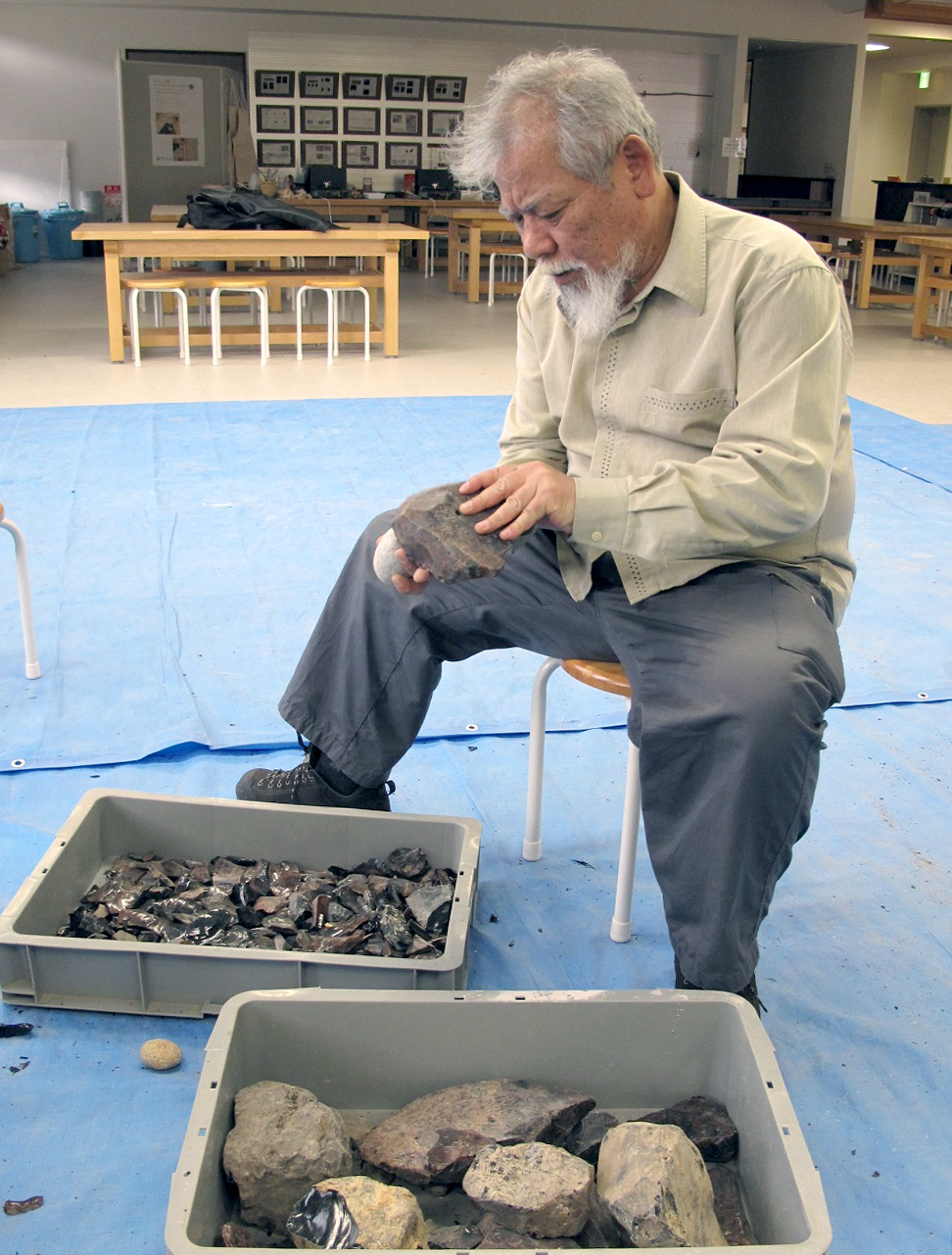
Professor Katsuhiko Ohnuma, the Institute for Cultural Studies of Ancient Iraq, Kokushikan University, Japan

Katsuhiko Ohnuma(大沼克彦) (born 1944) is a Japanese prehistorian and lithic expert. He was director of the Institute for Cultural Studies of Ancient Iraq, Kokushikan University.

Ohnuma received his Ph.D. in 1982 from the University of London, and has led several archeological projects, including rescue excavations in Syria and Iraq, focusing mainly on Neolithic and later sites. In recent years, he has participated in the excavations of Tangeh Bolaghi caves near Pasargadae and Tang-e Eshkan Cave in Arsanjan in southern Zagros, Iran.

His other research activities include publishing a book on the Lebanese Ksar Akil rockshelter in British archaeological reports series and numerous articles. His main interest is the Middle Paleolithic stone industry and he is a professional flintknapper who is focused on Middle Paleolithic industries and the Neolithic bladelet industry.

Taking a focused approach to various problems as outlined above, he developed effective experiments to test his hypotheses and elucidate aspects of the behavior of prehistoric populations. His efforts were always geographically centered upon the Near East and most specifically the Middle Palaeolithic. A special issue of the journal Al-Rafidan (XXVIII) was published in 2017 in his honor on the occasion of his 70th birthday Al-Rafidan- back issues.

== Degrees and titles ==
- Bachelor of Arts (Department of Anthropology, Nanzan University: March 31, 1973)
- Master of Arts (Graduate School of Humanities, Nanzan University, Major in Cultural Anthropology: March 31, 1977)
- Ph. D. (Institute of Archaeology, the University of London, Major in Prehistoric Archaeology: November 5, 1986)
- Professor Emeritus (Kokushikan University: June 17, 2015)

== Publications ==
- Ohnuma, K., & Bergman, C. A. (1990). A technological analysis of the Upper Palaeolithic levels (XXV–VI) of Ksar Akil, Lebanon. The emergence of modern humans: an archaeological perspective, 91-138.
- Ohnuma, K., Aoki, K., & Akazawa, T. (1997). Transmission of Tool-making through Verbal and Non-verbal Communication: Preliminary Experiments in Levallois Flake Production. Anthropological Science, 105(3), 159-168.
- Ohnuma, K., Bergman, C. A., & Newcomer, M. H. (1988). Ksar Akil, Lebanon: A Technological Study of the Earlier Upper Palaeolithic Levels of Ksar Akil, Volume III: Levels Xxv-Xiv (Vol. 426). BAR.
- Ohnuma, K (1976). Lithic Artifacts from Tar Jamal and Hafna. Al-Tar I: Excavations in Iraq, 1971–74. The Institute for Cultural Studies of Ancient Iraq, Kokushikan University: 303–329.
- Ohnuma, K. and C.A. Bergman (1982) Experimental Studies in the Determination of Flaking Mode. Bulletin of the Institute of Archaeology, University of London No. 19: 161–170.
- Bergman, C.A. and K. Ohnuma (1983). Technological Notes on Some Blades from Hummal Ia, El-Koum, Syria. Quartär Vol. 33/34: 171–180.
- Ohnuma, K (1986). Lithic Artifacts from Tar Jamal. Al-Rafidan V-VI: 51–57.
- Ohnuma, K (1988). Ksar Akil, Lebanon: A Technological Study of the Earlier Upper Palaeolithic Levels of Ksar Akil. British Archaeological Report, International Series 426, Oxford.
- Ohnuma, K., and T. Akazawa (1988). Reexamination of the Lithic Artifacts from Layer B of the mud Cave, Israel. Paléorient Vol. 14, No. 2: 137–144.
- Ohnuma, K (1990). An Analysis of the By-products of Experimental Manufacture of Classical Levallois Flakes. Al-Rafidan XI: 113–141.
- Ohnuma, K (1992). The Significance of Layer B of the Amud Cave (Israel) in the Levantine Levalloiso-Mousterian: A Technological Study. The Evolution and Dispersal of Modern Humans in Asia. Hokusen-sha Pub. Co., Tokyo:83–106.
- Ohnuma, K (1993). Experimental Studies in the Determination of Manners of Micro-blade Detachment. Al-Rafidan XIV: 153–181.
- Ohnuma, K (1993). A study by Replication on Manners of Micro-blade Detachment. The Origins and Dispersal of Microblade Industry in Northern Eurasia, 国際シンポジウム実行委員会，札幌：211–216.
- Ohnuma, K (1995). Analysis of Debitage Pieces from Experimentally Reduced “Classical Levallois” and “Discoidal” Cores. The Definition and Interpretation of Levallois Technology. Prehistory Press, Madison, Wisconsin: 257–266.
- Ohnuma, K (1997). Chronology of the “Proto-Neolithic” of Iraq and Syria: A Hypothetical View. Al-Rafidan XVIII: 45–58.
- Ohnuma, K (1998). Lithic Artifacts from Haditha, Iraq. Al-Rafidan XIX: 33–52.
- Ohnuma, K (2002). Lithic Artifacts from Tell Taban, Hassake, North-East Syria. Al-Rafidan XXIII: 53–67.
- Ohnuma, K (2008). Lithic Assemblages from TB75 and TB130. Tang-e Bolaghi. Al-Shark, Vol. 3: 87–119.
- Ohnuma, K (2009). Syria-Japan Archaeological Joint Research in the Bishri Region, 2007–2008. History and Antiquities of Al-Golan, 2008–2007. Syrian Directorate General of Antiquities and Museums: 99–114.
- Ohnuma, K (2012). Lithic Artifacts and Their Significance in the Region. The Arsanjan Project, 2011. 筑波大学：18–25.
- Ohnuma, K, and C.A. Bergman (2013). Technological Notes Concerning “Partially Faceted Butt” on Débitage from the Initial and Early Upper Palaeolithic Levels of Ksar Akil, Lebanon. Iranian Archaeology Vol. 4: 7–14.
