= Albéric d'Auxy =

Belgian historian and archaeologist

Count Albéric François Philippe d'Auxy de Launois (1836—1914) was a Belgian historian, archaeologist, and art collector.

== Life ==
Auxy was born in Mons on 29 July 1836, the son of Edouard Eugène d'Auxy. He became an expert on the history and antiquities of the city of Mons and the province of Hainaut.

He was involved in organising several exhibitions in various Belgian cities, including the Exposition rétrospective d'art industriel (1881) in Mons, and the Exposition des Arts anciens du Hainaut (1911) in Charleroi. He chaired the Mons section of the Amis de l'Art wallon and from 1864 was a particularly active member of the Cercle archéologique de Mons, serving as president from 1910. Many of his publications were contributions to the Annales du Cercle archéologique de Mons.

He died at home in Mons on 5 February 1914. In May 1940, during the Battle of Belgium, the house was partially destroyed, with the loss of much of his collection of art and antiquities.
