= J. T. Munby =

Julian Thomas Munby (born January 1954) is an archaeologist and fellow of the Society of Antiquaries of London known for his studies of the archaeology, buildings and landscapes of Oxfordshire and elsewhere. He was educated at Magdalen College School, Oxford, and UCL Institute of Archaeology. He is Head of Buildings Archaeology at Oxford Archaeology.

== Selected publications ==
- Roman Life and Art in Britain. 1977. (With Martin Henig) (British Archaeological Reports British Series)
- "J. C. Buckler, Tackley's Inn and three medieval houses in Oxford", Oxoniensia, 43, 1978, 123–69.
- "Crown-post and king-strut roofs in south-east England", Medieval Archaeology, 27, 1983, 123–35.
- Excavations at Portchester Castle IV: Medieval, the Inner Bailey. Society of Antiquaries of London, 1985. ISBN 0500990395 (With Barry Cunliffe)
- Portchester Castle. English Heritage, London, 1990. ISBN 1850742790
- The Tree-Ring Dating of the Round Tower, Windsor Castle, Berkshire. English Heritage, London, 2003. (With D. W. H. Miles & D. Haddon Reece) (Centre for Archaeology report)
- 'Queen Elizabeth's Coaches: The Wardrobe on Wheels', Antiquaries Journal, 83 (September 2003). pp. 311-367 doi:10.1017/S0003581500077726
- Stokesay Castle. English Heritage, London, 2005. ISBN 978-1850748168
- Edward III's Round Table at Windsor: The House of the Round Table and the Windsor Festival of 1344. Boydell Press, 2007. (With Richard Barber and Richard Brown) (Arthurian Studies) ISBN 978-1848858640
