= Caitlin Buck =

British archaeologist and statistician

Caitlin E. Buck (born 1964) is a British archaeologist and statistician specialising the application of Bayesian statistics to archaeology, and known for her work in radiocarbon dating. She is a professor in the Department of Mathematics and Statistics at the University of Sheffield.
