= Wulf Raeck =

German classical archaeologist

Wulf Raeck (born 1950) is a German archaeologist, specializing in classical archaeology.

== Education ==
Wulf Raeck studied at the University of Bonn, the University of Hamburg, and the University of Göttingen. His areas of study were classical archaeology, ancient history, classical philology, and art history.

His doctoral dissertation of 1980 (published 1981) was about the portrayal of barbarians in Athenian art in the sixth and fifth centuries B.C.

He received a travel fellowship from the German Archaeological Institute from 1980 to 1981, traveling through the Mediterranean.

== Professional career ==
After his travels, Raeck received an appointment at the Institute for Classical Archaeology at LMU Munich, where he wrote his habilitation (1987; published 1992) on classic picture themes in late antiquity.

In 1994, he took a position in classical archaeology at the University of Greifswald. Two years later, he transferred to a post at Goethe University Frankfurt, where he held a teaching position in classical archaeology until 2015.

=== Research ===
Raeck participated in Wolfgang Radt's excavation at Pergamon from 1972 through 1975. From 1982 through 1995, he directed the restoration of the Pergamon Trajaneum. In addition, he has led the digs at Priene since 1998, where he directs the Deutsche Forschungsgemeinschaft's project on urban development and housing and living conditions in ancient Priene as well The Hellenistic Polis as a Form of Life: Priene project.

== Selected publications ==
- Zum Barbarenbild in der Kunst Athens im 6. und 5. Jahrhundert v. Chr. Habelt: Bonn 1981 (Habelts Dissertationsdrucke. Reihe Klassische Archäologie, H. 14), ISBN 3-7749-1814-7
- Modernisierte Mythen. Zum Umgang der Spätantike mit klassischen Bildthemen Steiner: Stuttgart 1992, ISBN 3-515-05858-3 .
- Editor with Christoff Neumeister. Rede und Redner. Bewertung und Darstellung in den antiken Kulturen. Bibliopolis: Möhnesee 2000 (Frankfurter Archäologische Schriften, Bd. 1), ISBN 3-933925-07-X .
- Editor with Dirk Steuernagel. Das Gebaute und das Gedachte. Siedlungsform, Architektur und Gesellschaft in prähistorischen und antiken Kulturen. Habelt, Bonn 2012 (Frankfurter Archäologische Schriften, Bd. 21), ISBN 978-3-7749-3816-8 .
- Editor with C. Becker. Guido von Kaschnitz-Weinberg. Gelehrter zwischen Archäologie und Politik. Frankfurt a. M. 2016.
- "Das dritte nachchristliche Jahrhundert in der archäologischen Forschung und Bewertung. Das Beispiel des Porträts," in: A. Eich et al. (eds.), Das dritte Jahrhundert. Kontinuitäten, Brüche, Übergänge (Stuttgart 2017), pp. 15 – 33.
