= Andreas Zimmermann (archaeologist) =

German archaeologist

Andreas Zimmermann (born June 17, 1951, in Naumburg, Germany), is a German archaeologist. His scholarly focus is the Neolithic, in particular the LBK. Zimmermann studied geology, archaeology, and Egyptology at universities in Cologne and Tübingen. His 1982 dissertation was on the lithic material from the LBK site Langweiler 8. In 1992, he produced his habilitation from Frankfurt University, on the exchange of flint artifacts in central Europe during the Neolithic. Until becoming an emeritus in 2016, he was a professor at the Institut für Ur- und Frühgeschichte at Cologne University starting in 1997.

Zimmermann's primary research interest remains LBK. His other areas of interest are paleodemography, quantitative methods in archaeology, the use of GIS in the field, and archaeological theory.

== Selected recent publications ==
- Isabel Schmidt et al. 2020 "Approaching Prehistoric Demography: Proxies, Scales and Scope of the Cologne Protocol in European Contexts," Philosophical Transactions of the Royal Society B: Biological Science36(1816): doi.org/10.1098/rstb.2019.0714
- Tim Kerig; Kathrin Nowak; and Georg Roth (Eds.). 2016. Alles was zählt ... Festschrift für Andreas Zimmermann. (= Universitätsforschungen zur prähistorischen Archäologie. Nr. 285). Habelt: Bonn.
- Zimmermann, Andreas. 2012. "Cultural Cycles in Central Europe during the Holocene," Quaternary International 274: 251–258, https://doi.org/10.1016/j.quaint.2012.05.014
- Zimmermann, Andreas; Johanna Hilpert; and Karl Peter Wendt. 2009. "Estimations of Population Density for Selected Periods Between the Neolithic and AD 1800," Human Biology 81(3): 357–380.
