= Adam Ford =

British-born archaeologist

Adam Ford is a British-born archaeologist who has worked in United Kingdom, the Caribbean, the Middle East and Australia. He was host of the ABC television documentary Who's Been Sleeping in My House?.

Ford obtained qualifications at the Institute of Archaeology, University College London. He is director of the consulting firm DIG International and has undertaken a number of large archaeological investigations including that of the Panopticon and exercise yards at Pentridge Prison, Coburg, Victoria, and the site of Ned Kelly siege at Glenrowan, Victoria.
