= Keith Kintigh =

American anthropologist

Keith W. Kintigh is an American anthropologist and professor emeritus at Arizona State University. He specialises in quantitative archaeology and the archaeology of the Southwestern United States, conducting field research on Ancestral Pueblo sites in the Cibola region of New Mexico. He was one of the founders of Digital Antiquity, an organization supporting the long-term preservation of archaeological data, and its data repository the Digital Archaeological Record (tDAR).

== Education and career ==
Kintigh studied sociology and computer science at Stanford University, graduating in 1974, and received his PhD in anthropology from the University of Michigan in 1982. He worked joined the Department of Anthropology (later School of Human Evolution and Social Change) at Arizona State University in 1987 and served as the head of its Center for Archaeology and Society.

Kintight was the president of the Society for American Archaeology from 1999 to 2001, where he worked on implementing the Native American Graves Protection and Repatriation Act (NAGPRA). He was a Fulbright Scholar at University College Dublin in 2011.

== Selected publications ==
- Kintigh, Keith W. (1985). Settlement, Subsistence, and Society in Late Zuni Prehistory. Tucson, AZ: University of Arizona Press. ISBN 9780816508310.
- Kintigh, Keith W.; et al. (2014-01-21). "Grand challenges for archaeology". Proceedings of the National Academy of Sciences. 111 (3): 879–880. Bibcode:2014PNAS..111..879K. doi:10.1073/pnas.1324000111. ISSN 0027-8424. PMC 3903258. PMID 24449827.
