= Jocelyn Orchard =

British Trinidadian archaeologist (1936–2019)

Jocelyn Cecilia Orchard (27 October 1936 – 18 August 2019) was a British Trinidadian archaeologist and museum administrator. She specialised in the archaeology of the Near East and in particular the "Hajar Oasis Towns" of northern Oman.

== Education and career ==
Orchard was born in Port of Spain, Trinidad, on 27 October 1936, to Charles Farrell, a civil engineer, and Hilda May (née Herbert). She attended Bishop Anstey High School in Trinidad and was an overseas student at the Sorbonne. She received her master's degree from the University of Edinburgh in 1962 and a postgraduate diploma in Near Eastern archaeology from the Institute of Archaeology in London in 1966.

After graduating, Orchard worked on excavations at several major sites in the Near East, including Jerusalem, Petra, and Warka (Uruk). From 1967 to 1969 she served as the librarian of the Palestine Exploration Fund. She also worked with the British School of Archaeology in Iraq, where she met her future husband and close collaborator, Jeffery Orchard, then the British School's assistant director and from 1971 a lecturer at the University of Birmingham. Jocelyn joined Jeffery in Birmingham, where she worked as an administrator for the county museum service from 1976 until 1990.

Orchard died on 18 August 2019.

== Hajar Oasis Towns ==
Orchard first worked in South Arabia as an assistant to the Department of Antiquities of the Aden Colony (modern-day Yemen). From 1980 to 2010, she and her husband directed extensive field research in Oman, conducting surveys and excavations at what they called the "Hajar Oasis Towns", prehistoric settlements found in the Al Hajar Mountains, and their associated cemeteries and monuments.

Orchard argued that the Hajar Oasis Towns were large settlements on a par with Mesopotamian cities such as Uruk, supported by extensive agriculture and a sophisticated falaj irrigation system in what is now a desert region. She distinguished them from the settlements of the contemporary, much more simple Umm an-Nar culture, whilst other scholars considered them one and the same. Daniel T. Potts described this thesis as "arguably the most radical interpretation of late fourth and third millennium BC cultural development in the Oman peninsula since archaeological excavations began in [the] region", sharply critiquing it as "fundamentally flawed" and disputing Orchard's interpretation of the size, age, and agricultural sophistication of the Hajar towns, as well as their putative divergence from the accepted interpretation of Umm an-Nar sites. Orchard herself acknowledged that there was "virtually no empirical archaeological evidence" of the sophisticated falaj systems she asserted underpinned the Hajar Towns.
