= Marthe Oulié =

French archaeologist (1901–1941)

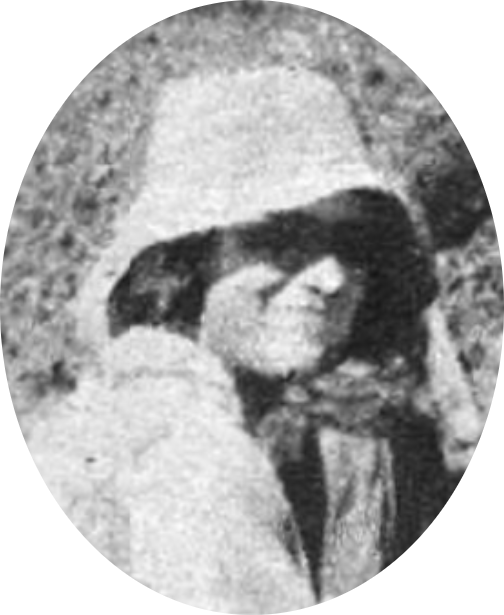
- Born: 24 December 1901; Paris, France
- Died: 14 July 1941 (aged 39); Vence, France
- Education: Sorbonne
- Occupation: Archaeologist
- Known for: Archaeological excavation in Crete

Signature
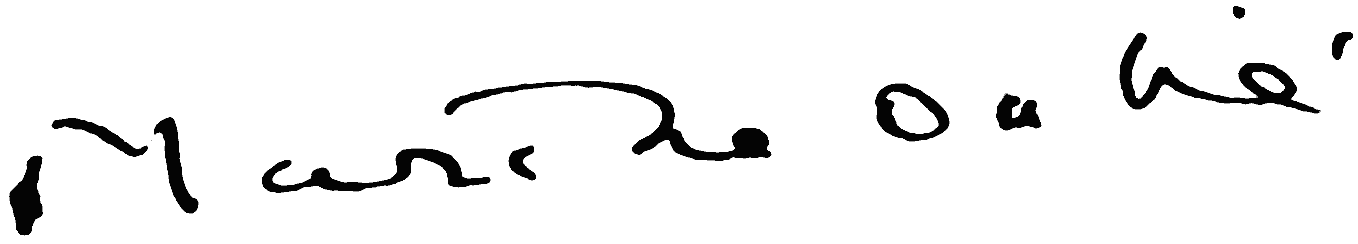

Marthe Germaine Oulié (24 December 1901 – 14 July 1941), also known as Marthe Oulie, was a French archaeologist and woman of letters who sailed the Mediterranean between Marseille and Athens in a nonmotorized ship with an all-female crew for carrying out archaeological excavation in Crete in 1925. She was “unusually adventurous in her travels.”

== Biography ==
Born on 24 December 1901, Marthe Oulié was the daughter of an Aveyron resident from Paris. Between 1912 and 1915, she studied at the Lycée Molière, a local public school in Paris. She obtained her baccalauréat at the age of sixteen and later graduated from the École du Louvre with a major in archaeology. In 1926 she wrote her thesis on Le Cosmopolitisme du prince de Ligne, 1735 – 1814 and received doctorate in letters from the Sorbonne.

After their training at Palestra, some young female athletes led by Marthe Oulié and Hermine de Saussure who was the mother of actress Delphine Seyrig, sailed the Aegean Sea in a small sailboat without an engine and covered more than 1,700 nautical miles in 1924.

In 1925, Oulié along with few young girls from the École du Louvre embarked on the sailboat for a cruise to the Greek islands for the archaeological excavations, which earned her the name the youngest archaeologist in France.

She wrote numerous travel novels. She received the Sobrier-Arnould Prize (1927); Academy Prize (1936); and Kastner-Boursault Prize (1938).

Oulié attended the International Congress of Women in Chicago in 1933 as a delegate. Later, she was invited to lunch with President Franklin Roosevelt at his Hyde Park, New York, home.

She died on 14 July 1941 in Vence after a long illness.
