= Clyde C. Kennedy =

Canadian anthropologist

Clyde C. Kennedy (1917–1987) was a Canadian anthropologist and founding member of the Ontario Archaeological Society. He was known for his work around the regions of Pembroke, Ontario, most notably the discoveries of Archaic Period artifacts, several of which are displayed at the Canadian Museum of History.

== Career ==
Kennedy was born in 1917 in Trail, British Columbia. The Canadian Journal of Archaeology notes that his interest in the field "began when he was a boy, finding Indian artifacts while exploring near his home in the South Kootenays". He was later employed by Atomic Energy of Canada, where he took part in anthropological and archaeological field work at the Sheguiandah site in the summers of 1952 and 1953.

In addition to being a founding member of the Ontario Archaeological Society, Kennedy was president of the Ottawa Valley Historical Society in 1965 and from 1971 to 1973. In 1975, he was a founding member of the Heritage Renfrew. From 1981 to 1983, he chaired the annual Ottawa Valley Archaeological Symposium.

Kennedy was posthumously awarded the J. Norman Emerson Silver Medal by the Ontario Archaeological Society in October 1987.
