= Norbert Benecke =

German archaeozoologist

Norbert Benecke (born 22 March 1954 in Osterburg, Germany) is a German archaeozoologist.

== Academic history ==
Norbert Benecke studied biology at the Universität Halle from 1974 through 1978. In that latter year, he was awarded the title Diplom-Biologe.

In 1979, he became a "scientific worker" (wissenschaftlicher Mitarbeiter) at the Zentralinstitut für Alte Geschichte und Archäologie of the Akademie der Wissenschaften der DDR.

Benecke received his doctorate in 1984 in Berlin on faunal remains at the early Medieval settlement of Ralswiek on the island of Rügen.

Starting in 1992, he was Docent for archaeozoology (Referent für Archäozoologie) at the Deutsches Archäologisches Institut (DAI) in Berlin, and from 2003 until retiring in 2020, he was the Director of the Natural Sciences Department at the DAI.

Benecke's foci are on the use of the animal world in various ecosystems during the Neolithic through the Iron Age as well as animal domestication.

== Publications ==
- Die Entwicklung der Haustierhaltung im südlichen Ostseeraum. Museum für Ur- u. Frühgeschichte Thüringens, Weimar 1986 (= Beiträge zur Archäozoologie 5, = Weimarer Monographien zur Ur- und Frühgeschichte 18).
- Der Mensch und seine Haustiere. Die Geschichte einer jahrtausendealten Beziehung. Theiss, Stuttgart 1994 ISBN 3-8062-1105-1.
