= Ron Vanderwal =

American-Australian Archaeologist (1938–2021)

Ronald Lewis Vanderwal
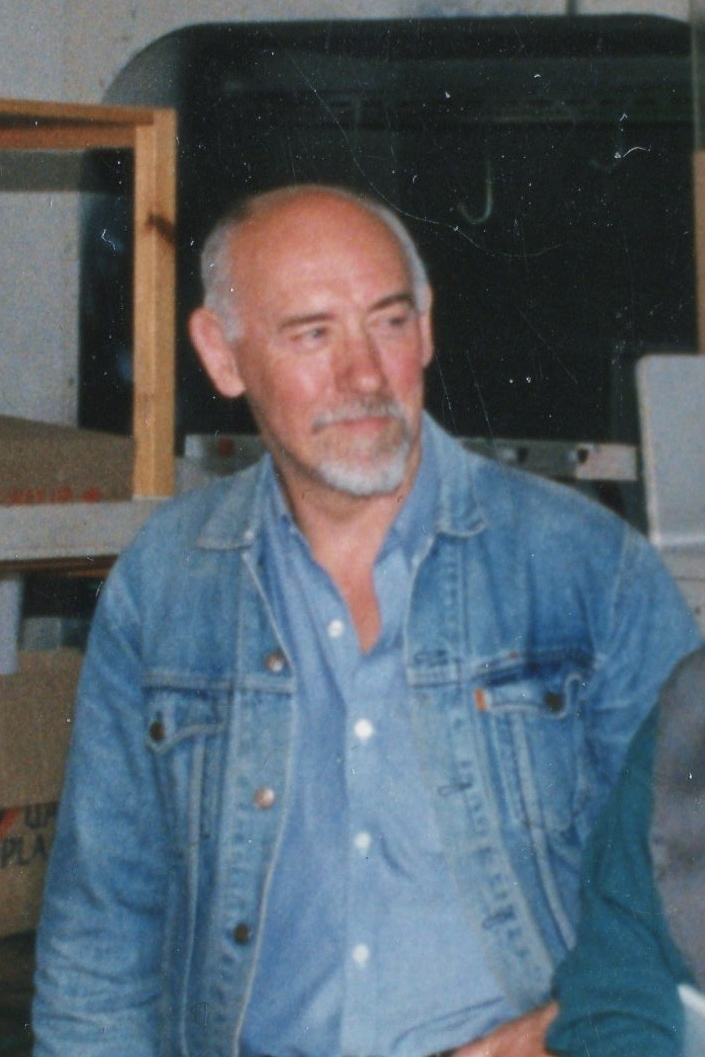
- Ron Vanderwal at Museum Victoria (Swanston Street, Melbourne), 22 December 1995
- Born: 7 August 1938
- Died: 19 July 2021 (aged 82)
- Citizenship: Australian
- Scientific career
- Fields: Archaeology
- Workplaces: La Trobe University Museum Victoria

Ron Vanderwal (7 August 1938 – 19 July 2021) was an American-Australian archaeologist who specialised in the prehistoric archaeology of the Pacific and New Guinea in particular. He worked at La Trobe University and the Museum of Victoria. Vanderwal died on 19 July 2021, at the age of 82.

Vanderwal studied anthropology at Michigan State University (BA in 1961) and the University of Wisconsin–Milwaukee (MA in 1969). From 1965 to 1969 he was archaeologist in Kingston, Jamaica where he helped establish a museum at the Institute of Jamaica. He moved to Australia in the 1970s undertaking a PhD in the prehistory of Papua at the Australian National University and subsequently taking on a role at the Tasmanian Museum. He was the first in 1969 to excavate the Yule Island site of Opposisi where the first millennium AD decorated Early Papuan pottery style horizon was defined.

He taught archaeology and prehistory at La Trobe University in 1978 with David Frankel in Australian coastal archaeology including fieldwork in remote places such as his pioneering work on the Papuan coast into prehistoric pottery, also with Nigel Oram on the history of the material culture exchange system. In 1981 he excavated the artificial mounds in the middle of Kinomere Village on Urama Island in the Papuan Gulf. He also undertook research at the Victoria Archaeological Survey compiling ethnographic records and editing their records.

Vanderwal began work at the Museum of Victoria on 31 August 1981 and was Senior Curator of Anthropology (Oceania) at Melbourne Museum up to his retirement in August 2009. He established the Pacific Islands Advisory Group to include Islanders in the development of the museum exhibitions. In 2009 he received the Award for International Relations by the Australian branch of the International Council of Museums in recognition of his twenty years of work promoting the cultural rights of Pacific Islanders in collaboration with the Fiji Museum.
