= Carl Jacob Gardberg =

Finnish art historian and archaeologist

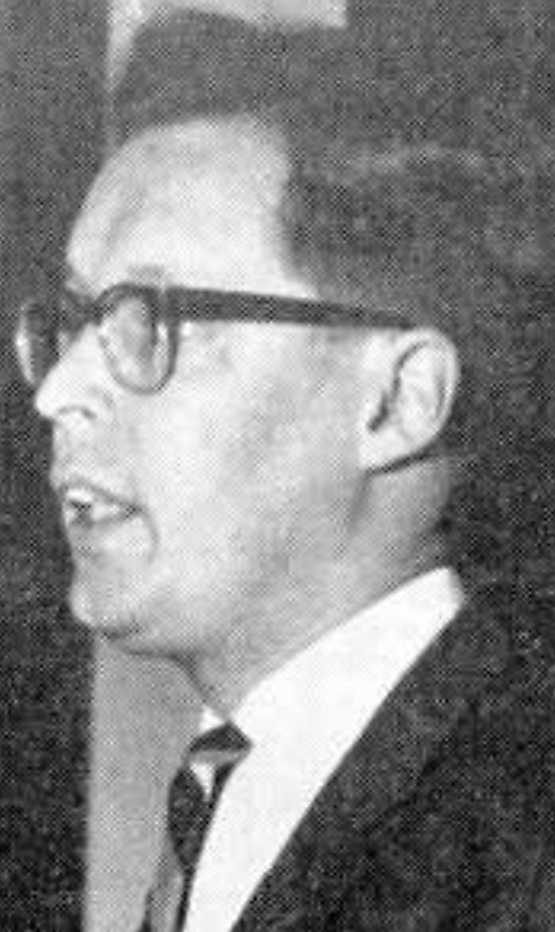
Carl Jacob Gardberg in the mid-1960s

Carl Jacob Reinhold Gardberg (16 November 1926 – 31 May 2010) was a Finnish art historian and archaeologist.

He was born in Helsinki. Having worked with restoration of Turku Castle since 1949, he became an associate professor at Turku Museum in 1954 and took his doctoral degree in 1960. From 1960 to 1972 he was the director of Turku Museum, also working as docent in cultural history at Åbo Akademi University from 1961 to 1972 and in archaeology at the University of Turku from 1969 to 1972. He then served as director of the Finnish Heritage Agency from 1970 to 1992. He was a member of the Norwegian Academy of Science and Letters from 1987.
