= Niculae Conovici =

Romanian archaeologist

Niculae Conovici (born 13 March 1948, Bucharest - died 7 June 2005, Bucharest) was a Romanian archeologist, amphorologist and numismatist. He has excavated in Satu Nou (Oltina), Constanța County.

== Selected works ==
- Aspecte ale circulației drahmelor din Dyrrhachium și Apollonia în peninsula balcanică și în Dacia, BNSR, 77–79, 1983–1985, p. 69-88
- Sapaturile arheologice în așezara getică fortificate de la Satu Nou, com. Oltina, jud. Constanța, campania 1989, Pontica, 23, 1990, p. 81-96, cu Mihai Irimia
- Niculae, Conovici (1998). Les timbres amphoriques. 2, Sinope, tuiles timbrées comprises. Histria : les résultats des fouilles. Vol. 8. Bucharest: Editura Enciclopedică. ISBN 2-87754-438-9.

== See also ==
- List of Romanian archaeologists
