= Suʻād Māhir Muḥammad =

Egyptian archeologist

Suʻād Māhir Muḥammad (29 August 1917 – 1996) was an Egyptian archaeologist, best known for her work on the Islamic history of Egypt. She was awarded the Order of the Arab Republic of Egypt, second class, in 1977.
