= Julie K. Stein =

American geoarchaeologist

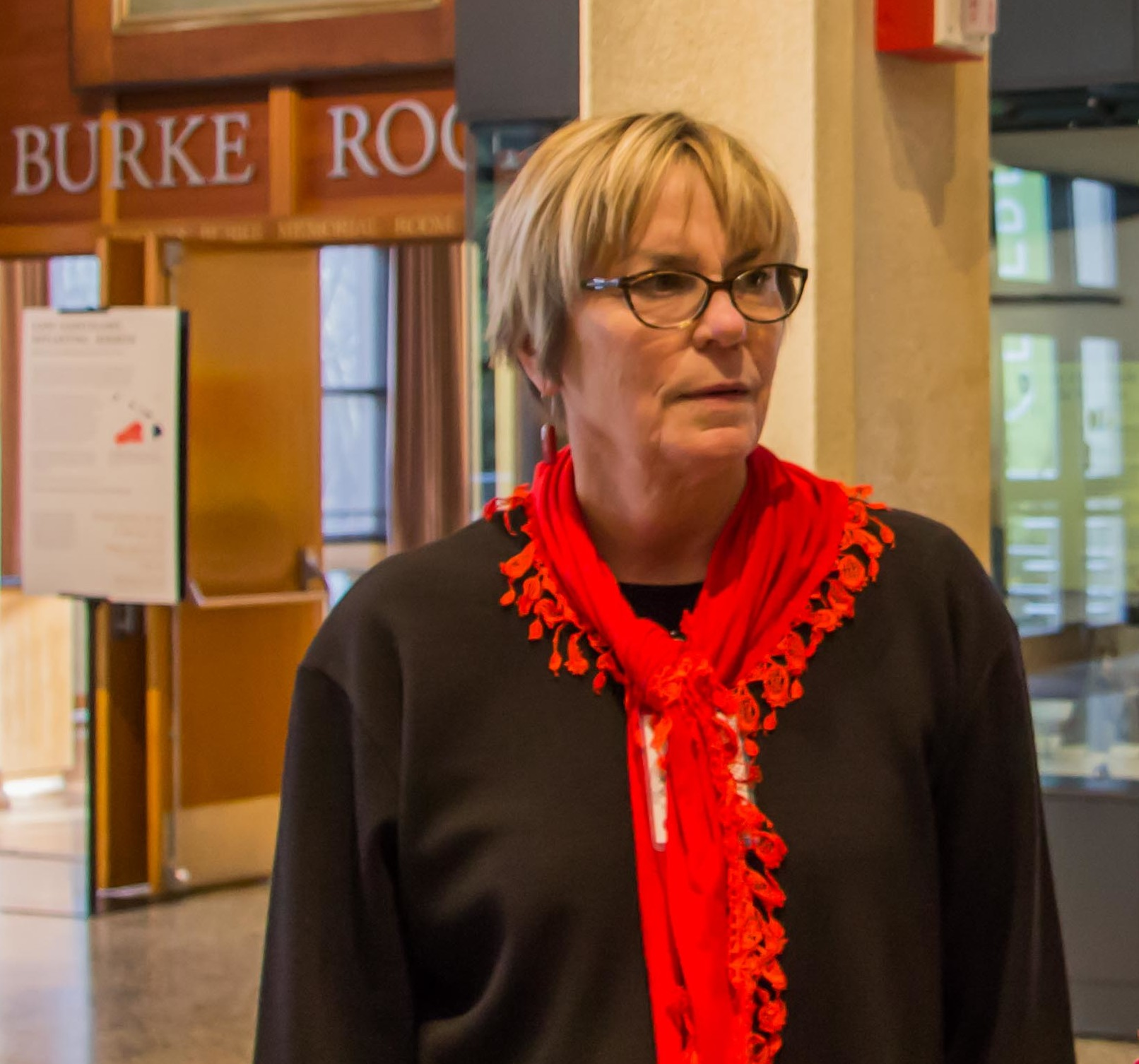
- Education: Western Michigan University; University of Minnesota
- Known for: Studies on shell middens of the Northwest Coast
- Scientific career
- Fields: Archaeology, Geoarchaeology, Museum Studies
- Workplaces: University of Washington, Burke Museum of Natural History and Culture

Julie K. Stein is an American geoarchaeologist, who is best known for her research on the coastal adaptions of prehistoric humans in the Pacific Northwest. She is executive director of the Burke Museum of Natural History and Culture and Professor of Anthropology at the University of Washington.

She has published several books on shell midden sites of the Northwest Coast and various publications on the analysis of sediments and stratigraphy of historic sites.

== Education ==
Stein majored in geology and anthropology at Western Michigan University, receiving her BA in 1974. She earned an MA in 1976 and PhD degree in 1980 from the University of Minnesota.

== Archaeological and academic career ==
=== Teaching ===
Stein began her academic career as a Geology laboratory instructor at the University of Minnesota in 1975. In 1979, she was hired as an instructor at the Science Museum of Minnesota. In 1980, Stein moved to Seattle, Washington and joined the Department of Anthropology at the University of Washington as an assistant professor.

In 1994, Stein was promoted to Professor of Anthropology at UW. In 1994–1995, she was named Acting Chair of the Department of Anthropology. In 1999, Stein was appointed Divisional Dean of Research in the College of Arts and Sciences. In 2005, Stein was the recipient of UW's Distinguished Teaching Award].

=== The Burke Museum ===
From 1985 to 1990, Stein served as Adjunct Curator of the Burke Museum, which is located on the University of Washington campus. In 1990, she was promoted to Curator of Archaeology at the museum and continued in that position until 1999. In 2005, Stein was named executive director of the Burke Museum.

Construction is underway on a new museum facility to open in 2019. When asked in December 2015 about the new museum, Stein responded, "Our goal with the new facility is to turn the museum inside out so that people can see and interact with the 16 million objects in our collections. We want them to know about the research and magic that is happening behind the scenes".

=== Research interests ===
"Stein's research focuses on geoarchaeology, especially sediments at archaeological sites and archaeological stratigraphy". She has conducted extensive research on shell middens, beginning with her dissertation research in 1977 on the Shell Mound Archaeological Project on the Green River in Kentucky. After joining the faculty of the University of Washington in 1980, she continued her research in the Pacific Northwest. She led a yearly excavation from 1984 to 1991 of 2000 year old shell middens buried under a 19th-century historic military site on San Juan Island.

When Stein noticed that the San Juan Island excavation drew hundreds of curious visitors, she "thought it was a shame they could not be included." When asked to lead an excavation on a shell midden on Vashon Island in 1996, " Stein agreed on the condition that the public be allowed to help. "Working with amateurs was one of the most difficult things I've ever done", she said, "but also one of the most successful"

In a four-hour session, volunteers would dig a small bucketful of the shell midden, screen it, separate shell and bone fragments from sand, and participate in a whole range of archaeological activities. In the process, they'd ask questions about why they were doing this and what could be learned from it. "That's where the real education took place." according to Stein. " It was wonderful to realize that if you get people to do archaeology, they appreciate and learn so much more about it."

Stein has led or collaborated on various research projects including: The Monticello Landscape Study in Virginia, the Fort Clatsop Geoarchaeological Project in Oregon, Kohala Hills Research in Hawaii and the Prairie Project in Washington.

== Selected publications ==
- Stein, Julie K.; Deo, Jennie N (2004). "Building Confidence in Shell: Variations in the Marine Radiocarbon Reservoir Correction for the Northwest Coast over the past 3,000 Years". American Antiquity. 69 (4): 771–786. doi:10.2307/4128449. JSTOR 4128449. S2CID 163966889.
- Stein, Julie K.; Huckleberry, Gene; Goldberg, Paul (2003). "Determining the provenience of Kennewick Man skeletal remains through sedimentological analyses". Journal of Archaeological Science. 30 (6): 651–665. Bibcode:2003JArSc..30..651H. doi:10.1016/S0305-4403(02)00200-5.
- Stein, Julie K. (2003). Vashon Island Archaeology: A View from Burton Acres Shell Midden. Burke Museum. p. 168. ISBN 978-0-295-98287-8.
- Stein, Julie K. (2001). Sediments In Archaeological Context. University of Utah Press. p. 232. ISBN 978-0-87480-691-5.
- Stein, Julie K. (2000). Exploring Coast Salish Prehistory: The Archaeology of San Juan Island. University of Washington Press. p. 136. ISBN 978-0-295-97957-1.
- Stein, Julie K. (1992). Deciphering a Shell Midden. Academic Press. p. 375. ISBN 978-0-12-664730-3.

== Awards ==
- 2015 – Western Museums Association's Director's Chair Award.
- 2005 – Distinguished Teaching Award University of Washington
- 2001 – Western Michigan University Distinguished Alumni Award.
- 1999 – Rip Rapp Archaeological Geology Award (Geological Society of America, Archaeological Geology Division).
