= Thomas Sever =

Dr. Thomas L. Sever is an archaeologist with NASA's Marshall Space Flight Center. Dr. Sever is NASA's only archaeologist and works primarily with Dan Irwin to decode remote sensing readings. While most of his work has dealt with South American and ancient Mayan civilization, Dr. Sever has also used his skills in meteorology.

Remote sensing uses an apparatus that scans the earth with CAMS to detect features not seen by the human eye. While the sensitivity creates hundreds of readings and possibilities, specialists must analyze the data to determine the meanings.

Dr. Sever has found that thermal imaging can discover old routes and footpaths now covered by dense vegetation. By interpreting the data, NASA has located hundreds of old and abandoned cities, not previously known to exist.

Sever also used remote sensing technology in Costa Rica. A project team of professionals from NASA and the University of Colorado searched in the mountains for ancient footpaths, the oldest known in the New World, buried under six volcanic deposits and obscured from the air by a 150-foot jungle canopy. The difference in moisture level of the soils detected by TIMS led to their discovery. Although they saw no physical evidence of the footpaths on the ground, the team dug trenches to confirm their existence through archaeological investigation. In addition, by following the footpaths and using predictive modeling, the project team located approximately 60 settlements and other sites in areas of the Costa Rican mountains that had been believed to be uninhabited in prehistoric times. He currently teaches at the University of Alabama in Huntsville (UAH).

== Articles by Sever ==
- Sever, Thomas L. 1994 Appendix G. Remote Sensing Study of the 1930 Hangar Locus. In Archaeological, Geophysical, and Remote Sensing Investigations of the 1930 Wight Brothers' Hangar, Wight-Patterson Air Force Base, Ohio, by David W. Babson, et al., USACERL Technical Report 98/98, July 1998. U. S. Army Corps of Engineers, Construction Engineering Research Laboratories, Champaign, Illinois.
- Sever, Thomas, NASA's Marshall Flight Center: A Regional Monitoring and Visualization System for the Meso-American Biological Corridor and Beyond
- Sever, Thomas, Irwin Daniel 2003. Landscape Archaeology: Remote-Sensing Investigation of the Ancient Maya in the Peten Rainforest of Northern Guatemala. Ancient Mesoamerica, 14, 113–122.
