= Aedeen Cremin =

Australian archaeologist

Aedeen Cremin (born 1940) is an Irish born, Australian archaeologist working in New South Wales and Canberra.

== Life and education ==
Cremin was born in Ireland and was educated Dublin, Paris, Rome, and London. She moved to Australia in the 1970s and has degrees in archaeology from the National University of Ireland and University of Sydney.

== Career ==
Cremin was a lecturer at the University of Sydney from 1978 to 2000, where she taught archaeology and Celtic studies, and then was a casual lecturer in archaeology as Visiting Fellow at the Australian National University and University of Canberra teaching world history up to 2015. She has undertaken fieldwork in northern Portugal between 1988 and 1992 and Angkor, Cambodia from 2001 to 2015.

Cremin's research covers landscape archaeology, especially in North Portugal (The Vinhais Survey) and in Australia's industrial heritage (mining and metallurgy), with a particular interest in boundaries and boundary crossings, and she has published numerous works including general texts in archaeology and Celtic Studies. She was the Australian representative on the industrial heritage body, TICCIH in the 1990s.

== Publications ==
Aedeen has worked as heritage editor, for the Australia ICOMOS publication Historic Environment, and the encyclopedia Archaeologica: The World's Most Significant Sites and Cultural Treasures. She co-authored Australia's Age of Iron and, most recently, two chapters in The Angkorian World (ed. Mitch Hendricksen et al., Routledge 2023). Aedeen is sole author of The Celts and The Celts in Europe and contributes articles about archaeology to the ISAA Review, journal of the Independent Scholars Association of Australia.
