= Inger Zachrisson =

Swedish archaeologist (born 1936)

Inger Zachrisson (born 1936) is a Swedish archaeologist specializing in the history of the Sami people. As associate professor of archaeology at Uppsala University and former curator of Stockholm's History Museum, she has researched Sami archaeology and history since the Iron Age.

Zachrisson ran the South Sami project from 1984 to 1998, leading to her Möten i gränsland. Samer och germaner i Mellanskandinavien (Encounters in Border Country: Saami and Germanic peoples in central Scandinavia), published in 1997. She has revealed that from the Late Stone Age in Scandinavia, there were two cultural traditions, the Sami in the north-east and the Scandinavians in the south-west. Her archaeological finds and linguistic analyses show that from the year dot until 1300 AD, there were increasing contacts between the two groups. Her work on the 11th and 12th-century burial site Vivallen in Härjedalen on the Swedish-Norwegian border showed that what had been considered to be Viking graves were in fact Viking merchants buried in the Sami tradition. Findings of wool and linen clothing, brooches and rings at the site also demonstrated the level of contact between the Scandinavians and the Sami who maintained their non-Christian traditions.

== Publications in English ==
- Odelberg, Maj; Thålin-Bergman, Lena; Zachrisson, Inger (1980). Viking ways: on the Viking age in Sweden. The Swedish Institute.
- Zachrisson, Inger (1976). Lapps and Scandinavians: archaeological finds from northern Sweden. Kungl. Vitterhets- historie- o. antikvitetsakad. : Almqvist & Wiksell international, distr. ISBN 978-91-7402-005-2.
- Zachrisson, Inger (1985). Saami Or Nordic?: A Model For Ethnic Determination of the Northern Swedish Archaeological Material from the Viking Period and the Early Middle Ages.
