= Lost Civilizations (book series) =

Series of history books by Reaktion Books

- Country: United Kingdom
- Language: English
- Genre: World history
- Publisher: Reaktion Books
- Published: 2015 – present
- Media type: Hardback, paperback, e-book
- No. of books: 19
- Website: Lost Civilizations Reaktion Books

Lost Civilizations is a series of books that have been published by Reaktion Books since 2015. The books explore the origins, development and decline of ancient civilizations and peoples, and considers the history, art, culture and legacy of these civilizations.

To date, nineteen titles have been published as part of the series.

The series has covered civilizations from various continents:

- Asia (Indus, Persia, Sumer, Phoenicia, Hittites, Korea, Assyria and the Scythians)
- Africa (Egypt, Nubia and Ethiopia)
- Europe (Barbarian, Etruscan, Goths, Greece and Minoan)
- Americas (Aztecs, Inca and Maya)

== List of books ==
All titles have been published as hardback and electronic books. So far, seven titles have also been published in paperback.

Except for The Sumerians, all titles were published first in hardback with the electronic versions being published later or, since 2021, simultaneously with the hardback versions.

List of books published as part of the Lost Civilizations series
No.	Title	Author	Publication date			Civilization	Ref.
No.	Title	Author	Hardback	E-book	Paperback	Civilization	Ref.
1	The Indus	Andrew Robinson	1 October 2015	1 June 2016	15 February 2021	Indus Valley Civilisation	
2	The Persians	Geoffrey Parker and Brenda Parker	1 November 2016	17 February 2017	1 February 2023	Persia	
3	Egypt	Christina Riggs	1 May 2017	1 August 2017	28 February 2022	Ancient Egypt	
4	The Barbarians	Peter Bogucki	1 June 2017	1 August 2017	1 October 2024	Barbarian kingdoms	
5	The Etruscans	Lucy Shipley	1 October 2017	1 October 2017	13 November 2023	Etruscan civilization	
6	The Goths	David M. Gwynn	11 December 2017	14 May 2018	—	Goths	
7	The Greeks	Philip Matyszak	14 May 2018	1 July 2018	—	Ancient Greece	
8	The Sumerians	Paul Collins	17 May 2021	15 March 2021	1 August 2026	Sumer	
9	The Aztecs	Frances F. Berdan	14 June 2021	14 June 2021	—	Aztec Empire	
10	The Phoenicians	Vadim S. Jogulov	1 November 2021	1 November 2021	1 September 2024	Phoenicia	
11	The Inca	Kevin Lane	14 February 2022	14 February 2022	—	Inca Empire	
12	The Maya	Megan E. O'Neil	2 May 2022	2 May 2022	—	Maya civilization	
13	Nubia	Sarah M. Schellinger	17 October 2022	17 October 2022	—	Kingdom of Kush	
14	The Hittites	Damien Stone	1 February 2023	1 February 2023	—	Hittites	
15	The Three Kingdoms of Korea	Richard D. McBride II	1 June 2024	1 June 2024	—	Three Kingdoms of Korea	
16	The Assyrians	Paul Collins	1 October 2024	1 October 2024	—	Assyria	
17	The Minoans	Ellen Adams	1 August 2025	1 August 2025	1 April 2027	Minoan civilization	
18	The Ethiopians	Steven Kaplan	1 September 2025	1 September 2025	—	Kingdom of Aksum and Ethiopian Empire	
19	The Scythians	Caspar Meyer	15 June 2026	15 June 2026	—	Scythians	

== Reception ==
=== The Indus ===
World History Encyclopedia gave The Indus a score of 4 out of 5 stars, describing the book as "the perfect introduction to the Indus civilization" and written in a way that it can "explain complex processes in a direct way" to the reader. Dilip Kumar Chakrabarti wrote a review of The Indus for Indian Historical Review in which he described the book as "a brief but excellent introduction to the Indus Civilisation". Lionel Knight, in a review for the Royal Asiatic Society of Great Britain and Ireland, commented that Robinson "writes with an elegant clarity which comes from a masterly overview of the subject". Writing for the Journal of Asian Studies, Brad Chase described The Indus as "a journalistic attempt to synthesize contemporary archaeologists' understanding of the Indus Civilization for a popular audience". Chase felt that it was "commendable" that Robinson acknowledged the "social context in which archaeological knowledge is produced" because this was often omitted from popular writings on ancient civilizations. However, he also felt it was unfortunate that Robinson showed a "credulous repetition of Jane McIntosh's fanciful depiction of the [Indus] as a "peaceful realm"", as no "serious scholar" of the Indus would argue for an absence of conflict.

=== The Persians ===
Jessica Settergren of World History Encyclopedia gave The Persians a score of 4 out of 5 stars, recommending the book as an "excellent introduction to the history of Iran". Settergren described it as "a gorgeous coffee table book" and praised the "heavy, photo-quality glossy paper" with "liberally populated" pictures, maps, timelines and artwork. Choice recommended the book for general readers and undergraduate students, describing it as an "elegantly written volume".

Gholam Reza Vatandoust of Persian Literary Studies gave a mixed review of the book, commenting that it was "lacking in critical analysis of the historical development of Iran through its different phases", had "numerous historical gaps" and that its target audience was "unclear". The Persians also had a "serious" omission in failing to "[explore] the frontiers among numerous ethnic and religious diverse communities that inhabit the region" and "[refrains] from using some of the excellent sources available in Farsi". However, the reviewer did note that the book was "engaging and easy to read" and writing a narrative of 2,500 years of Persian history was "a noble undertaking". Vatandoust also felt that the book could offer "an entertaining account and a reasonable perspective on the history and civilization of Persia" for travellers to Iran and had the potential to become " a favorite choice for tourist centers and hotel bookstands throughout Iran". Lara Fabian wrote a mixed review of The Persians for Antiquity, in which she described the "slim and readable book" that unfortunately "[simplifies] the complex historical strands to the point of inaccuracy", with the most successful sections being those that "deal with the reception of Persian history in early modern and modern Western scholarship, rather than the discussions of Persia itself".

=== Egypt ===
Ancient Egypt magazine highly recommended Egypt for "the numerous consumers of 'pop' Egyptology" as "an absolutely essential antidote to the gloss and the glitz" due to its "critical assessment of the modern construction of 'ancient Egypt'". Choice gave Egypt a score of 4 stars and commented that Christina Riggs "[achieved] the objectives of the publisher's Lost Civilizations series" and the book was "perfect" for those "seeking a brief introduction" as well as being "essential" for "all public and academic [...] libraries". In a review on the book by The Classical Journal Matt Gibbs described it as a "erudite and illuminating work" and useful for those "working on Egypt in terms of ethnicity and reception". Gibbs praised Riggs for "[considering] the rather difficult aspects of colonialism that are rife in the West's treatment of Egypt". He also felt that it was "essential reading for those interested in considering ancient Egypt's importance not only in modern Egyptian culture, but also in the rest of the world".

=== The Barbarians ===
William H. Funk of World History Encyclopedia gave the book 4 out of 5 stars. Funk described the book as a "beautifully illustrated volume" which provides a "short overview of mainly Northern and Central European "barbarian" cultures", written for the "general reader" and accessible for college students. Funk noted that Bogucki's narrative provided a "strictly archaeological rather than anthropological perspective".

Anthony Smart gave a mixed review of The Barbarians for The Classical Journal. Smart commented that a "survey incorporating different groups, and considering issues of identity and ethnicity, would satisfy a current need in the scholarship", but "Bogucki's efforts here do not fully satisfy this need". Smart noted the "ambitious chronological coverage" of 2000 BC to 500 AD, though the range of different cultures "[limited] the depth of the discussion". Ultimately, Smart felt the book "does not provide as useful a survey of the barbarian world as is needed" but instead "presents an enjoyable collection of sketches" and "highlights important archaeological sites and finds".

=== The Etruscans ===
Andrew Selkirk gave a positive review of The Etruscans for Current World Archaeology magazine. He described it as "a splendid little book" which manages to "strip away the mystery that surrounds this lost civilisation" and is "cleverly written". Bijan Omrani wrote a positive review of Classics for All, describing the book as a "comprehensive introduction" to the Etruscan civilization, "beautifully illustrated", noting that Shipley goes "beyond the pure material legacies" to explore the "cultural impact of the Etruscans in the modern age" and that it was likely to "engage contemporary readers" due to drawing analogies "between her subject and contemporary politics".

Fred S. Kleiner of Boston University reviewed the book for The Historian, describing the writing style as "engaging [and] conversational" and the book as a whole as "well-illustrated". He additionally noted the author's "intimate familiarity with Etruscan archaeological sites" and the "balanced and fully formed discussion" of the origins of the Etruscans. However, Kleiner was disappointed with the fact that there was only a "passing reference" to Etruscan art in the entirety of the book.

=== The Goths ===
In his review for Bryn Mawr Classical Review, Giovanni Alberto Cecconi noted the book's "flowing style" and its usefulness for "specialists in Romano-barbaric societies", though also noted its intended audience was the general public and it contained "no unprecedented theories or exhaustive arguments on specific problems or documents". He called the book "fascinating" and praised its exploration of the "modern cultural heritage of the notion of "the Gothic"", as well as the "knowledge and accuracy" shown by the author that is evidenced by his references.

=== The Greeks ===
William Brown of World History Encyclopedia gave The Greeks five out of five stars, praising Matyszak's "engaging historical narration" and the way he was able to "[boil] the complexities down so that [general readers] can comprehend the historical and political circumstances".

=== The Sumerians ===
Amanda H. Podany reviewed The Sumerians for the Journal of the American Oriental Society. She felt the book was "important", but was very different from "other surverys of the ancient Middle East" because it was not "traditional history" or a "thematic history of a period or a people". Instead, the book was "an examination of what has been discovered and asserted (wrongly) about the [...] Sumerians, and how the perception of their culture has changed over time". She felt that, overall, the book "makes a vital and thought-provoking contribution" to studies of the ancient Middle East, and was "written in such a way that readers beyond those working in the field will also find it accessible". She additionally noted the book was "attractively laid out" with "beautiful color illustrations" and "clear" and "readable" formatting and font of the text. She however felt that a subtitle could have been added to "alert readers to the difference between this book and those that have come before it".

=== The Aztecs ===
In a review for the magazine Minerva Maria Earle praised this book for being "a satisfyingly comprehensive study" of the people of the Aztec Empire. Earle also noted the book's "lively passages" and "wealth of fascinating detail about Aztec life". She felt it was a "wonderful introduction" on the Aztecs for the general reader while "wearing its considerable scholarship lightly".

Patrick Saurin reviewed The Aztecs for the journal Estudios de Cultura Náhuatl. While Saurin appreciated the "balance between academic rigor and clarity", he noted an "absence of key scholarly works in the bibliography".

=== The Inca ===
In a review for The Wall Street Journal Gerard Helferich called The Inca a "concise and well-illustrated introduction" to the Inca Empire. Helferich noted that Kevin Lane explored competing theories and that the book included a "particularly revealing" discussion of the Inca economy.

=== Nubia ===
In a review for the archaeology magazine Minerva Nigel Fletcher-Jones called the "well-illustrated" book useful for "anyone interested in the cultural and political dynamics of north-east Africa" and highlighted the sections on the Kingdom of Kerma, the Napatan kings who ruled after the end of the Twenty-fifth dynasty of Egypt, the Meroitic kingdom and the societal role of Nubian women as particularly interesting.

Writing for Bryn Mawr Classical Review, Marie-Kristin Schröder called Nubia "an important and valuable contribution as an introduction on Nubian civilizations" and additionally noted that it was "useful to the general public as well as students". She noted the book was "at times generalizing and vague", but nonetheless provided a "thorough summary of the Nubian civilizations", particularly the Napatan and Meroitic periods. Schröder noted the various illustrations included in the book but felt that "ground plans would have been desirable".

== Awards ==
- 2018 Society for American Archaeology book award (Popular Category) for The Barbarians (Peter Bogucki)
- 2021 Felicia A. Holton Book Award from Archaeological Institute of America for The Barbarians (Peter Bogucki)
