= Andrew Selkirk =

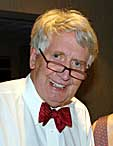
- Born: 1937 (age 88–89)
- Occupations: Founder and Editor-in-Chief of Current Archaeology
- Website: www.currentpublishing.com

Andrew Selkirk FSA is Editor-in-chief of Current Publishing, and former Vice-President of the Royal Archaeological Institute.

== Early life and education ==
Selkirk was born in 1937 and attended his very first dig aged 13 years old. He did his National Service in the Intelligence Corps, where he learnt Russian. He then read Classics at Oxford, where he became President of the Oxford University Archaeological Society.

== Publishing ==
He then became a Chartered Accountant, serving articles with Smith and Williamson and while editing the student magazine Contra, Selkirk found he had a penchant for magazine publishing. Coupling this with his passion for archaeology, he founded Current Archaeology in 1967.

The publication now has a readership over 14,000.

In 1998, he co-founded Current Publishing with his son Robert, as the home of his flagship magazine, and the platform for Current World Archaeology (which launched in 2003) Military History (in 2010), and was joined by Ancient Egypt in 2023.

Andrew Selkirk is now the editor-in-chief of two of the publications, whilst his son Robert is the company's publisher and managing director.

His research and expertise has been cited in many other books, including The Amateur Archaeologist by Stephen Wass (1992); Archaeology in British Towns by Patrick Ottoway (1996); and The Ethics of Archaeology by Chriss Scarre and Geoffrey Scarre (2006). Selkirk's knowledge of British archaeology has been consulted by History Today, in which he has discussed topics including 'the changing face of Pre-Conquest Britain'.

== Archaeological career ==
According to the Northamptonshire Archaeological Society, Selkirk 'has gone on to become well known throughout British archaeology'. He has worked with a number of archaeological societies and organisations. In addition to his appointments as a Fellow of the Society of Antiquaries and Vice-President of the Royal Archaeological Institute, he is Chairman of the Council for Independent Archaeology, and co-founder of the British Archaeological Awards. As noted by the Archaeology and Contemporary Society of Liverpool University, 'The Council for Independent Archaeology was created in 1989 to ensure that the interests of independent/amateur archaeologists do not get lost in the face of the increasing professionalisation and specialisation of archaeologists and archaeological practice'.

He has served on the councils of the Roman Society and the Prehistoric Society, and has lectured on 'The Valletta Convention', and 'The Public Face of Archaeology', amongst other subjects. He continues to promote amateur archaeology and archaeology independent of government. According to the Adam Smith Institute, Selkirk 'advocates the use of Independence Impact Statements as part of a drive to end the capture of Britain's Arts and Heritage'.

In May 2000, Selkirk appeared as a studio guest on the BBC programme, Talking Point On Air, presented by Robin Lustig, debating the subject 'Whose art is it anyway?' He has been quoted in The Guardian, condemning cuts to funding on the British Museum.

== Personal interests ==
A keen traveler, Selkirk enjoyed touring the archaeological sites of Britain in his camper van, and visiting excavations across the globe.

He is currently writing a book The Dark Secret of Ancient Greece, arguing that the secret of Greece was that they invented money, and that Greece was the world's first market economy.

== Personal life ==
He is married to Wendy (née Frost) and they have three children, Fiona, Alexander and Robert, and four grandchildren.
