= Milefortlet 23 =

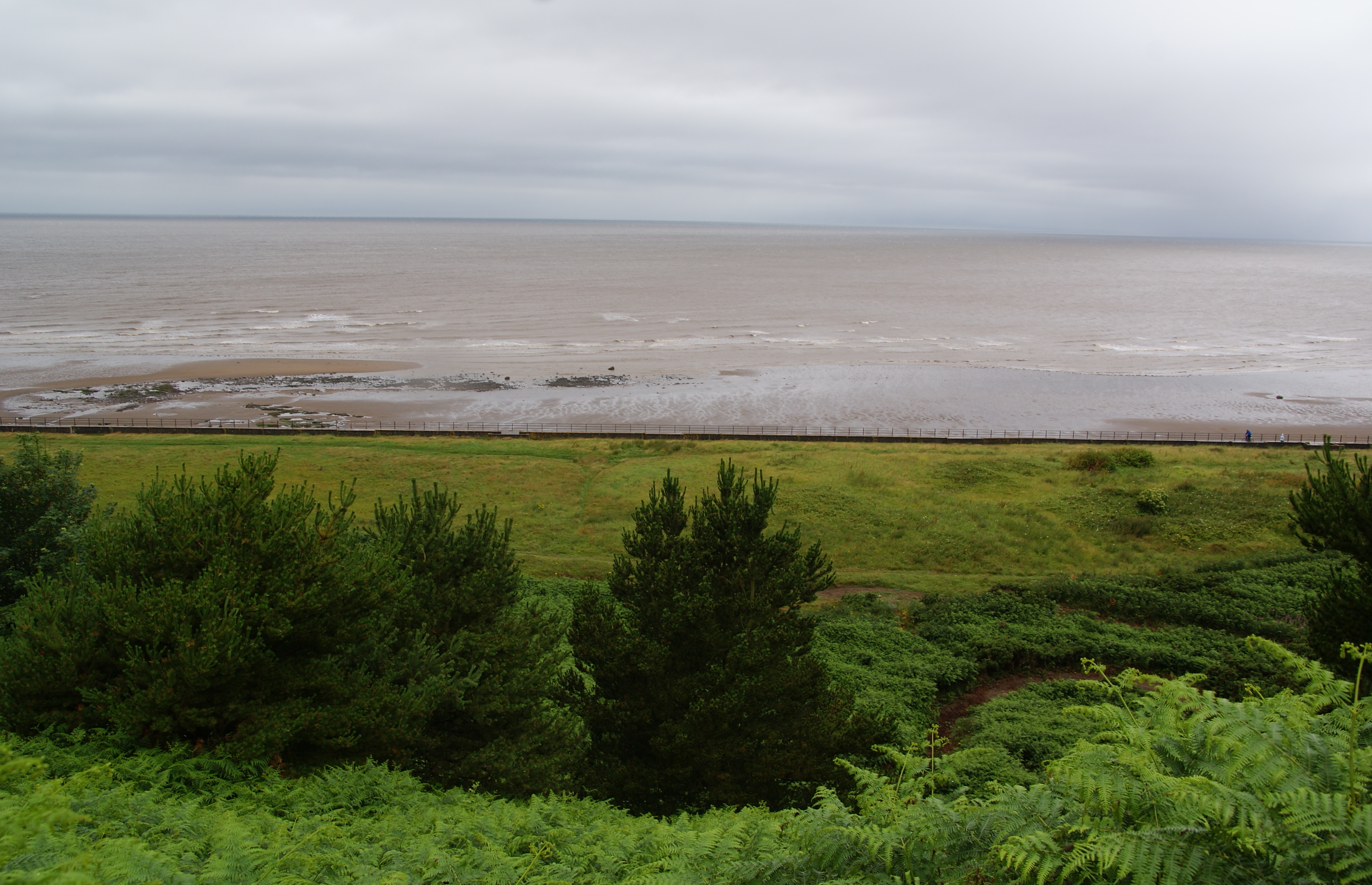
- View towards the sea near the site of Milefortlet 23

- Location within Cumbria
- 54.72792°N 3.485135°W
- Type: Milecastle
- Location: Cumbria, England

Milefortlet 23 (Sea Brows) was a Milefortlet of the Roman Cumbrian Coast defences. These milefortlets and intervening stone watchtowers extended from the western end of Hadrian's Wall, along the Cumbrian coast and were linked by a wooden palisade. They were contemporary with defensive structures on Hadrian's Wall. There is nothing to see on the ground, but Milefortlet 23 has been located and surveyed.

== Description ==
Milefortlet 23 is north of the town of Maryport in the same parish. It is on a south-east facing slope at the edge of a steep cliff. The fortlet is about 1 kilometer northeast of the Roman fort of Alauna.

Nothing can be seen on the ground but the fortlet is visible on aerial photographs as faint cropmarks. A geophysical survey was carried out in 1994 which showed three sides of a surrounding ditch, the fourth, west side, having been destroyed by cliff erosion. Further features within the milefortlet were detected in another geophysical survey when the area of the Roman Fort (Alauna) and vicus, incorporating the area of Milefortlet 23, was surveyed between 2000 and 2004.

== Associated Towers ==
Each milefortlet had two associated towers, similar in construction to the turrets built along Hadrian's Wall. These towers were positioned approximately one-third and two-thirds of a Roman mile to the west of the Milefortlet, and would probably have been manned by part of the nearest Milefortlet's garrison. The towers associated with Milefortlet 23 are known as Tower 23A (grid reference NY04203757) and Tower 23B (grid reference NY03953714). The locations of both towers are uncertain, and their positions have been estimated by measurement to adjoining Roman frontier works. The position of Tower 23B may overlap with the Alauna fort in Maryport.
