= Edith Wightman =

British historian

Edith Mary Wightman FSA FSA Scot
- Born: 1 January 1938; Leith, Scotland
- Died: 17 December 1983 (aged 45); Hamilton, Ontario, Canada
- Education: St Andrews; Oxford
- Occupations: Archaeologist, ancient historian

Edith Mary Wightman FSA FSA Scot (1 January 1938 – 17 December 1983) was a British ancient historian and archaeologist. She taught at McMaster University from 1969 until her death in 1983, rising to full professor. Wightman was best known for her studies Roman Trier and the Treveri (1970) and Gallia Belgica (1985).

== Biography ==
=== Early life and education ===
Edith Mary Wightman was born on 1 January 1938 in Leith, Scotland, the daughter of R. J. and Edith W. Wightman. She studied at the University of St Andrews, receiving her MA in 1960, when she graduated at the top of her year and was awarded the Millar Prize for the best annual record in her faculty. She held graduate scholarships until 1965. She then studied at Oxford under Ian Richmond and C. E. Stevens, receiving a diploma in Classical Archaeology, also with distinction, in 1962 and a DPhil in 1968. Her doctoral thesis on Roman Trier and the Treveri was published as a monograph in 1970. It was the first monographic study of the civitas Treverorum and was reviewed in more than twenty journals across Europe and America.

=== Career ===
Wightman was an assistant lecturer and then lecturer at the University of Leicester from 1965 to 1969. In 1969 she joined the Department of History at McMaster University in Canada and took Canadian citizenship. There she rose from assistant professor to associate professor in 1973 and to full professor in 1978. She succeeded Edward Togo Salmon as the department's ancient historian.

Wightman's excavation experience began as a student, at Corbridge and on smaller sites in Britain between 1956 and 1959. She went on to spend three seasons as first assistant to the director G. C. Schwarz at Avenches in Switzerland, and worked under Graham Webster at the Roman villa of Barnsley Park. In the Mediterranean she took part in three projects: the Canadian excavations at Monte Irsi under Alastair Small; the Second Canadian Team excavations at Carthage, which she co-directed with Colin Wells; and the multidisciplinary field survey of the Liri Valley, Italy, which she directed.

Wightman was a regular attendee at Roman archaeology conferences, presenting on her research areas. These included the International Congress of Roman Frontier Studies, where she first presented her work on Gaul at Tel Aviv in 1967 and spoke on the Lingones at the congress in Lower Germany in 1974.

=== Death ===
Wightman was murdered on 17 December 1983 in her office at McMaster University in Hamilton, Ontario. She was found bound with surgical tape over her eyes and mouth and her hands handcuffed behind her back. Credit cards were missing, and police considered robbery the probable motive. A man was charged with the murder some weeks later.

== Reception ==
Wightman's work has been described as a "model of how to combine literary, epigraphic, and archaeological data with caution and imagination". Her research for Gallia Belgica involved annual visits to archaeological institutes in Belgium, France, Germany and the Netherlands. Her posthumously published survey of Gallia Belgica has been called "magisterial", and John Percival wrote that "it is hard to think of a better study of an individual Roman province in terms of comprehensiveness and reliability". A "concern for the Roman countryside and its population" underlay her work, and she was remembered for her skill as a researcher and teacher and as "a much loved and respected scholar".

== Honours ==
Wightman was elected a Fellow of the Society of Antiquaries of Scotland in 1972, a Fellow of the Society of Antiquaries of London in 1973, a foreign associate member of the Société des Antiquaires de France in 1976, and a Fellow of the Royal Society of Canada in 1982.

== Works ==
- Wightman, E. 1970. Roman Trier and the Treveri. London
- Wightman, E.M. 1974. La Gaule chevelue entre César et Auguste. In Actes du IXeme Congres International d'études sur les Frontières Romaines, Mamaïa, 6-13 septembre 1972.
- Wightman, E.M. 1975. The pattern of rural settlement in Roman Gaul. ANRW 2.4: 584-657
- Wightman, E.M. 1977. Military arrangements, native settlements and related developments in early Roman Gaul. Helinium 17, 105–126.
- Wightman, E. 1978. Peasants and potentates: an investigation of social structure and land tenure in Roman Gaul. American Journal of Ancient History 3.
- Wightman, E. 1980. The plan of Roman Carthage, in New Light on Ancient Carthage (Ann Arbor, 1980), 29-46
- Wightman, E. 1981. The lower Liri valley: problems, trends and peculiaritiies. In G. Barker and R. Hodges (eds.) Archaeology and Italian Society. Prehistoric, Roman and Medieval Studies. Oxford: BAR International Series 102.
- Wightman, E. 1985. Gallia Belgica. London: B. T. Batsford
- Wightman, E.M. 1994a The Iron Age. In J.W. Hayes and I.P. Martini (eds.) Archaeological survey in the Lower Liri Valley, Central Italy (BAR International Series 595). Oxford, Tempus Reparatum. 13–17.
- Wightman, E.M. 1994b Communications. In J.W. Hayes and I.P. Martini (eds.) Archaeological survey in the Lower Liri Valley, Central Italy (BAR International Series 595). Oxford, Tempus Reparatum. 30–33.
- Hayes, J.W. and Wightman, E.M. (1984) Interamna Lirenas: risultati di ricerche in superficie 1979–1981. In S. QuiliciGigli (ed.) Archeologia Laziale VI (Quaderni del Centro di Studio per l'Archeologia Etrusco-Italica 8). Roma, Consiglio Nazionale delle Ricerche. 137–148.
