= Conquering the Ocean =

2022 book about the Roman conquest of Britain by Richard Hingley

Conquering the Ocean: The Roman Invasion of Britain
- Cover
- Author: Richard Hingley
- Language: English
- Series: Ancient Warfare and Civilization
- Subjects: Roman history, British history, military history
- Genre: Non-fiction
- Publisher: Oxford University Press
- Publication date: 25 March 2022 (hardcover), 25 May 2024 (paperback)
- Publication place: United States of America (New York)
- Media type: Print
- Pages: 336
- Awards: Finalist, 2023 PROSE Awards
- ISBN: 9780190937416

Conquering the Ocean: The Roman Invasion of Britain is a 2022 non-fiction book by British archaeologist Richard Hingley. Part of the Ancient Warfare and Civilization series by Oxford University Press, the book narrates in details the Roman conquest of Britain, spanning from Julius Caesar's expeditions in 55 and 54 BCE to the construction of Hadrian's Wall in the early 2nd century CE. Drawing on new archaeological findings and classical sources, Hingley challenges traditional depictions of inevitable Roman domination, emphasizing the resistance from the native Britons, including the famous revolt led by Boudica. The book has been well-received and was a finalist for the 2023 PROSE Awards.

== Background ==
In a 2022 interview with the World History Encyclopedia, Hingley explained that while the southeastern part of Britain fell to the Romans relatively quickly, the conquest of the rest of the island, particularly in Wales and northern Britain, was significantly more challenging and protracted. The Romans faced strong resistance from local populations, and their campaigns stretched over several decades, ultimately culminating with the construction of Hadrian's Wall in the 120s CE. Hingley highlighted how imperial hubris contributed to the Roman miscalculation of how long the conquest would take, noting that Roman commanders often overestimated their ability to quickly subjugate Britain, which was seen as a "distant, fabulous place" in Roman thought. To provide a narrative for this tale, Hingley argues that victories in Britain were seen by a sequence of military leaders and emperors as enabling the incorporation of an island set within the divine waters of Oceanus (the Latin term for Ocean).

== Overview ==
Hingley examines the Roman conquest of Britain, spanning from Julius Caesar's initial expeditions in 55 and 54 BCE to the construction of Hadrian's Wall in the early 2nd century CE. In this work, Hingley challenges traditional narratives of inevitable Roman dominance, highlighting the long and often difficult process of subjugating the British Isles. Drawing upon both classical sources and recent archaeological discoveries, the book provides new insights into Roman military strategies, local resistance, and the cultural interactions between the Romans and native Britons.

The book emphasizes that the Roman conquest was not a short-term event, but a protracted process that stretched over a century. Julius Caesar's initial ventures into Britain were exploratory rather than conclusive, with Rome not establishing permanent control until Emperor Claudius's invasion in 43 CE. Even after Claudius's success in southeastern Britain, Roman expansion into Wales, the peoples of central Britain, and northern Britain mounted significant resistance, with native revolts like Boudica's rebellion in 60 CE temporarily pushing back the invaders.

Hingley integrates archaeological evidence to reveal a fuller picture of both Roman military activities and the everyday lives of the British population under occupation. He explores how some British tribes formed alliances with the Romans, while others fiercely resisted. The book also provides fresh insights into the Roman military infrastructure in Britain, such as the presence of women and children in military forts, indicating these sites were not purely martial but also served as bases for settlement.

The culmination of the Roman conquest, as discussed in the book, was the construction of Hadrian's Wall around 122 CE, marking the northern boundary of Roman power. Hingley reinterprets the significance of the Wall, suggesting that Roman propaganda framed the conquest of Britain as a triumph over Oceanus, the ancient sea god, and the "barbaric" lands beyond.

Throughout the book, Hingley also addresses modern interpretations of the Roman conquest of Britain, particularly the evolving legacy of figures like Boudica, who has become a symbol of resistance and female empowerment.

== Critical reception ==
Matthew Symonds, editor of Current World Archaeology, praised the book for its incisive commentary on Roman military campaigns and its skillful integration of archaeological and literary evidence. He highlighted Hingley's focus on both Roman and British perspectives, as well as his innovative exploration of the symbolic role of the ocean in Rome's conquest of Britain. Symonds noted that "teasing out this dimension adds real freshness to the subject," and commended the book as an essential read for those interested in Roman Britain.

Jerry D. Lenaburg judged the work as "a fascinating and well-illustrated look at this neglected aspect of Roman and ancient war history." Lenaburg stressed Hingley's use of historical and archeological sources to offer fresh insights into the Roman conquest of Britain, the varied responses of native tribes, and the evolving interpretation of figures like Boudica. He also commended the detailed analysis of Roman military strategies, settlements, and the broader cultural impact on Britain.

In his review, David Marx praised Hingley's analysis of both Roman ambitions and Iron Age British culture, noting that the book sheds "relative new light on an oft forgotten aspect of ancient Roman history." Marx appreciated the detailed examination of Roman military outposts and civilian settlements, especially the presence of women and children in previously thought military-only spaces. He also emphasized Hingley's portrayal of Roman elite motivations, especially their obsession with the seas.

British Roman archaeologist Claire Millington found the book to be a highly readable and engaging account of the Roman conquest and occupation of Britain, aimed at a general audience. She appreciated its synthesis of recent literary, archaeological, and epigraphic research, as well as its focus on Rome's military and political decisions. While she praised the book's broad historical scope, she pointed out that ambiguities and contradictory evidence were sometimes underplayed.

Christina S. Kraus, Professor of Classics at Yale University, observed that Hingley's Conquering the Ocean "is not just a conventional flash, but points us to perhaps the key aspect of the Roman view of Britain … That this was not just another island … but one which lay on the other side of the border of the known world …". She called the narrative of the book a "masterful blend" of the archeological and textual records.

Donato Sitaro of the University of Naples called it a "captivating and compact book". He observed that the book presents a "rich overview" of the Roman conquest of Britain in which literary sources are “harmoniously integrated” with the framework provided by archaeological discoveries. Sitaro emphasized that the book will provide valuable knowledge both for the historians of Roman Britain and also for enthusiastic readers "who will enjoy its captivating narration".
