= Jerome M. Eisenberg =

American dealer in antiquities (1930–2022)

Jerome M. Eisenberg (July 6, 1930 – July 6, 2022) was an American art historian, dealer, and appraiser of antiquities and artworks. He had a son. Eisenberg died in July 2022 of pneumonia in a hospital in Manhattan, New York, at the age of 92.

Antiquities handled by Eisenberg ended up in major museum collections like the Getty, the Metropolitan Museum of Art and the Art Institute of Chicago.

He also published scholarship in art history such as "Indian and South-East Asian art from the Alsdorf collection" (Minerva, 8, no. 5, Sept./Oct. 1997: 15–18), and also provided appraisals.

'According to the D.A., New York-based dealers such as Jerome Eisenberg’s Royal-Athena Galleries and the Merrin Gallery “funneled the stolen Bubon bronzes into museum exhibitions and academic publications thereby laundering the pieces with newly crafted provenance.”'

The Bubon sculpture of Septimius Severus was eventually returned to Turkey in 2025.

According to The Aikaterinis Laskaridis Foundation, a non-profit cultural organization, established in spring 2007 by Presidential Decree, signed by the Ministries of Culture, Education, Maritime Affairs and Economy (GG 606 / 24.4.2007):

[Eisenberg] studied geology and pursued postgraduate and doctoral studies in archaeology and the history of ancient art. He founded and directed the Royal-Athena Galleries in New York and London from 1942 until 2020. He taught as a visiting professor of ancient art history at the Universities of New York and Leipzig. He wrote numerous articles on archaeology, numismatics, and ancient art. From 1990 to 2009, he was the editor of the archaeological journal ‘Minerva’. He collaborated with many American museums as a dealer of ancient artworks and with other public and private American entities as an appraiser and expert witness. He was a fervent advocate of the legal and ethical trade of antiquities and participated in related American and international committees.

— "The library of Professor Jerome Eisenberg", The Aikaterinis Laskaridis Foundation

== Books ==
- A Collector's Guide to Seashells of the World (McGraw-Hill, 1981)
- Art of the Ancient World: A Guide for the Collector and Investor (1985)

== See also ==
- Oscar White Muscarella, another expert in fraudulent antiquities
