= Congress of Roman Frontier Studies =

The Congress of Roman Frontier Studies or Limes Congress is one of the most important conferences on archaeology in Europe. The conference takes place on a triennial basis, although there have been some exceptions. The first congress was held in Durham in 1949; the most recent one took place in Batumi, Georgia, in 2024.

== History of the Congress of Roman Frontier Studies ==
On the initiative of Eric Birley, about 20 archaeologists and historians assembled at King's College, Newcastle, then part of Durham University in 1949. Speakers included famous archaeologists like Sir Mortimer Wheeler, Andreas Alföldi and Franz Oelmann. Plans to establish regular meetings of British and international academics were developed as early as the late 1920s, when Birley met Ernst Fabricius and his assistant Kurt Stade from the German Reichs-Limeskommission. World War II, however, prevented a realisation of a planned meeting in 1940.

The intention was to hold the second Congress in Algeria in 1954 to enable Colonel Jean Baradez to show parts of the Fossatum Africae but the death of Louis Leschi, then Director of Antiquities in Algeria, made it impossible to organise the Congress. However, some Roman frontiers scholars were able to visit Baradez's excavations at Gemellae in April of that year.

Since 1949, the congress has been hosted by 14 different countries including the non-European countries of Israel (1967) and Jordan (2000) as well as the eastern Black Sea coast in Georgia in 2024. In terms of size, the Limescongress has developed from about 20 participants and 11 papers in 1949 to over 400 participants presenting over 200 papers in the year 2022, when the 25th conference was held in Nijmegen in the Netherlands. Great Britain hosted the Congress of Roman Frontier Studies six times and Germany has hosted it four times. Due to the COVID-19 pandemic, the 2021 congress in Nijmegen, Netherlands, was moved to 2022. The most recent meeting took place in Batumi, Georgia from September 8 to 14, 2024, returning to the initial three-year cycle. The next Congress is due to be held in 2027 in Rabat, Morocco.

== The Organisation of the Congress ==
The idea of the Congress was the brain child of Eric Birley and Kurt Stade, but the first meeting was prevented by the start of the Second World War. Birley, therefore, organised the first Congress in 1949 by himself. Thereafter, the tradition grew that those archaeologists who had organised a Congress formed an informal committee that received proposals for the location of future meetings. This arrangement has continued to this day. At the end of each Congress a plenary session hears the proposal (sometimes proposals) for the next location and votes on the nomination. A local group, with support from the international committee, then organises the next Congress. This informality extends to the election of the international chair(s) of the Congress. For many years the Congress was co-Chaired by Professors David Breeze and Siegmar von Schnurbein, with von Schnurbein stepping down when he retired (2006) and Breeze continuing in the role. David Breeze stepped down in Ingolstadt in 2015 and Dr Rebecca Jones and Dr Andreas Thiel were then elected by the whole Congress at the closing plenary session. These informal arrangements have served the Congress well over the last 70 years.

== Past Congresses ==
=== 1. 1949 Newcastle, UK ===
The first Congress was held in Newcastle from 11 to 14 July 1949, organised by the University of Durham in conjunction with the Society of Antiquaries of Newcastle upon Tyne and the Cumberland & Westmorland Antiquarian & Archaeological Society, the Society of Antiquaries of London, Society of Antiquaries of Scotland, Cambrian Archaeological Association and the Society for the Promotion of Roman Studies. During the previous week, representatives of these bodies and some delegates took part in the Centenary Pilgrimage of Hadrian's Wall.

Eleven papers were published in 1952, all in English. Papers were presented by Andreas Alföldi, Jean Baradez, Antonio Frova, Albert Egges van Giffen, Ulrich Kahrstedt, Rudolf Laur-Belart, V E Nash-Williams, Hans Norling-Christensen, Franz Oelmann, Anne Strachan Robertson and Mortimer Wheeler.

=== 2. 1955 Carnuntum, Austria ===
The second Congress ran from 25 to 29 July 1955 in Carnuntum with support from the Federal Ministry of Education shortly after modern Austria had been established. It was organised by Erich Swoboda. There were speakers from 10 countries and 34 participants in total.

There were representatives from Algeria, Austria, Czechoslovakia, France, Germany, Hungary, Italy, Switzerland, Yugoslavia, and the UK. 22 papers were published in 1956 in four languages (English, German, French and Italian). They included the classic paper on Hadrianic frontier policy by Eric Birley.

=== 3. 1957 Rheinfelden / Basel, Switzerland ===
The third Congress ran from 26 to 31 August 1957, being organised by Rudolf Laur-Belart. It started in Rheinfelden but located to Basel for the main scientific event where the city and university were patrons.

20 papers were published in 1959 in four languages (German, English, French and Italian).

=== 4. 1959 Durham, UK ===
The fourth Congress was held in Durham from 10 to 15 September 1959, following the Pilgrimage of Hadrian's Wall (6-10 September) which was attended by many of the foreign participants. The proceedings were not published.

The 89 participants came from Algeria, Austria, Belgium, Bulgaria, France, Germany, Israel, Italy, the Netherlands, Switzerland, the United States and the UK, and included D. Baatz, E. Badian, J. Baradez, E. and A. R. Birley, J. E. Bogaers, C. M. Daniels, B. Dobson, E. Ettlinger, Lady Fox, A. Garzetti, J. P. Gillam, M. Gichon, C. Isings, T. Ivanov, M. G. Jarrett, G. Jobey, H-J. Kellner, J. Kent, H. Klumbach, R. Laur-Belart, N. McCord, I. MacIvor, J. C. Mann (organiser), J. Mertens, J. Moreau, J. Morris, R. Nierhaus, H. von Petrikovits, H-G. Pflaum, C. W. Phillips, A. Piganiol, A. Radnoti, I. A. Richmond, A. L. F. Rivet, A. S. Robertson, L. Ruggini, P. Salway, W. Schleiermacher, H. Schönberger, K. Stade, K. A. Steer, C. E. Stevens, E. Swoboda, G. Ulbert and J. J. Wilkes.

The themes were artificial frontiers and their component structures, economic development of the frontier districts, developments of the fourth century, and Rome beyond the frontiers. D. Oates gave a special lecture on Hatra as well as a paper on the frontier in Mesopotamia.

=== 5. 1961 Yugoslavia ===
The fifth Congress was held in several locations in the former Yugoslavia. From 11 to 16 September 1961 there was a pre-Congress excursion to Istria and Dalmatia, visiting Ljubljana, Poreč, Pula, Split, Hvar and Zadar. Delegates stayed in hotels and on board steamers. The main Congress ran from 17 to 23 September with delegates continuing to travel around. Lectures were given in Celje, Ptuj, Zagreb, Osijek, Sremska Mitrovica and Belgrade. This was followed by a post-Congress excursion to Upper Moesia from 24 to 26 September, visiting Prahovo, Gamzigrad, Niš. Justiniana Prima and Skopje. The result was that each constituent part of Yugoslavia was visited.

There were 69 participants from Algeria, Austria, Belgium, Bulgaria, Czechoslovakia, France, Germany, Greece, Italy, Israel, the Netherlands, Poland, Switzerland, Yugoslavia, the UK, and the USA. 19 papers were published in 1963 in three languages (English, German and French).

=== 6. 1964 South Germany ===
The sixth Congress took place in South Germany in September 1964, organised by Hans Schönberger and based at Arnoldshain in the Taunus. There was an excursion from 4–9 September which visited a range of sites on the Limes from Frankfurt to Regensburg including a three-day cruise to Regensburg. There were about 100 delegates.

27 papers were published in 1967 in three languages (German, English and French).

=== 7. 1967 Tel Aviv, Israel ===
The seventh Congress took place in Tel Aviv University from 3–19 April 1967 at the initiative of Mordecai Gichon. Supporters included the Ministry of Education, the Department of Antiquities and Museums, various local museums, the National Parks authority, the Hebrew University Jerusalem and the Zionist Federation of Great Britain and Ireland. Visits during the congress included Caesarea, Beersheba, Masada, Jerusalem and Nazareth.

37 papers were published in 1971 in three languages (English, French and German).

=== 8. 1969 Cardiff, UK ===
The eighth Congress took place in Cardiff, Wales from 28 August - 2 September 1969, with Michael Jarrett one of the main organisers. It was sponsored by the University of Wales and the University of Birmingham. The cost of attendance at the Congress was £50 = $120

A preliminary tour ran from 25 to 28 August, visiting sites in southern England including Richborough, Lympne fort, Pevensey fort, Fishbourne Roman Palace, Portchester (Portus Adurni), Badbury Rings, Hod Hill and Bath (Aquae Sulis). Tours during the Congress whilst based in Cardiff included Cardiff Roman Fort, Neath Roman fort, Blaen-cwm-bach camp, Coelbren fort, Y Gaer, Caerwent, Caerleon, Newport Museum, Lydney Park, Cirencester and The Lunt. Delegates then moved north to visit Wroxeter, Old Oswestry, Chester (including the Grosvenor Museum), Caernarfon, Tomen y Mur, York and the Yorkshire Museum. After the Congress, many members took part in the Pilgrimage of Hadrian's Wall, beginning on the evening of 7 September. En route to Newcastle they visited Durham Cathedral.

Michael Jarrett published the second edition of V. E. Nash-Williams, The Roman Frontier in Wales (Cardiff 1969), to coincide with the Congress.

There were just over 100 participants. 32 papers were published in 1974 in three languages (English, German and French).

=== 9. 1972 Mamaia, Romania ===
The ninth Congress was hosted in the summer resort of Mamaia in Constanța from 6–13 September 1972. There were so many papers offered that there were two parallel sessions for the first time, on 10–11 September, one on Archaeology and one on History. Visits were made to the Greek cities on the Black Sea coast and Adamklissi. The post-Congress tour (14-17 September) travelled by way of the Olt valley into Dacia visiting forts and museums.

There were 186 participants. 57 papers were published in 1974 in three languages (French, German and English).

=== 10. 1974 Lower Germany ===
The tenth Congress took place in Germania Inferior, the organising committee including people from Germany, Belgium and the Netherlands. It was hosted in Xanten and Nijmegen from 13 to 19 September 1974. The pre-Congress excursion (10-13 September), travelling by ship along the Rhine, included Mainz, Boppard, Koblenz, parts of the Limes, Bad Hönningen, Remagen and Neuss. During the Congress, visits included Cologne, Haltern am See, Xanten and Tongeren. The post-Congress excursion (20-23 September) included Nijmegen, Utrecht, Amersfoort, Zwammerdam, Scheveningen, Valkenburg (Praetorium Agrippinae), Leiden and Amsterdam. A handbook to the frontier in Lower Germany was produced to coincide with the Congress: J. E. Bogaers and C. B. Rüger (eds), Der Niedergermanische Limes (Bonn 1974).

At the Congress, Eric Birley, who was unable to attend, was acclaimed honorary president for life by the Congress and the Congress proceedings were dedicated to his 70th birthday.

There were about 180 participants. 67 papers in three languages (English, German and French) were published in 1977, organised by province with a short section on General Topics at the end.

=== 11. 1976 Székesfehérvár, Hungary ===
The 11th Congress took place in Székesfehérvár, Dunaújváros and Budapest from 30 August to 6 September 1976. A pre-Congress excursion ran from 27 to 29 August starting in Carnuntum in Austria and then moved into Hungary, visiting Sopron, Szombathely, Keszthely, Fenékpuszta, Tihany and Veszprém. During the congress, delegates visited sites around Komárom-Esztergom, Tokod, Nyergesújfalu, Gorsium (Tác), Szentendre, Visegrád, Dunaújváros, and sites and museums around Budapest. The post-Congress excursion ran from 7–9 September, visiting sites including Szekszárd, Mohács and Pécs.

There were 156 participants. 57 papers in three languages (English, German and French) were published in 1977, organised by the geographical topic of their subject.

=== 12. 1979 Stirling, UK ===
The 12th Congress took place in Stirling in Scotland from 1–9 September 1979. The pre-Congress tour was on 1 September and took delegates from Carlisle in England to Stirling via Burnswark (Siege of Burnswark) and Birrens (Blatobulgium). There was a public lecture on 2 September by Kenneth St Joseph on 'Aerial Reconnaissance and the map of Roman Scotland' accompanied by an exhibition of photographs from Cambridge University. Visits during the congress included Dunsinane Hill, the Cleaven Dyke, Inchtuthil, Fendoch, Ardoch, Kaims Castle, the Gask Ridge, Cramond Roman Fort, the National Museum of Antiquities of Scotland in Edinburgh, Torwood Broch, the Hunterian Museum and Art Gallery, Stirling Museum, Meigle Sculptured Stone Museum, Tealing Earth House, Carpow Roman Fort, Dundee City Museum and parts of the Antonine Wall including Rough Castle Fort, Croy Hill, Bar Hill and Bearsden Bath-house. The post-Congress tour ran from Stirling to Newcastle upon Tyne in England via Pennymuir Roman camps, Woden Law hillfort and High Rochester (Bremenium).

Most papers at Congresses were organised geographically and were excavation reports. Seeking to counter-balance this trend, the organisers of the 1979 Congress invited specific colleagues to provide over-views of recent work in individual provinces. A handbook was prepared for the tours: David J. Breeze, Roman Scotland. A guide to the visible remains (Newcastle upon Tyne 1979), supplemented by David J. Breeze (ed), Roman Scotland. Some Recent Excavations (Edinburgh 1979).

Over 150 archaeologists attended with 77 papers published in three volumes and three languages (English, German and French) in 1980, arranged by Roman province with a general section at the end.

=== 13. 1983 Aalen, Germany ===
The 13th Congress took place in Aalen in Baden-Württemberg, Germany from 18 to 25 September 1983. The pre-Congress tour ran from 14 to 17 September and started in Basel in Switzerland, also visiting the Roman site at Dangstetten, various museums, the late Roman Limes on the Upper Rhine to Schwaderloch, Vindonissa, Rottweil, and other places including Köngen and Schwäbisch Gmünd. Tours during the congress included Heidenheim an der Brenz, Ellwangen Castle, various sites on the Upper Germanic-Rhaetian Limes, Walldürn, Kastell Theilenhofen, Gunzenhausen and Weissenburg. The post-Congress excursion visited Roman sites in the Bavarian Danube valley on 26–27 September, including Faimingen, Eining, Kelheim, Regensburg, Straubing and Passau.

284 archaeologists from 20 European and overseas countries took part in the conference. There were 120 papers ranging from Britain to the Balkans, the Middle East, North Africa and Spain. Eric Birley gave an overview of Limes Research since Ernst Fabricius. 115 papers in 3 languages (German, English and French) were published in 1986, arranged by Roman province with a general section at the end.

=== 14. 1986 Carnuntum, Austria ===
The 14th Congress took place in Carnuntum in Austria from the 14–21 September 1986. The pre-Congress excursion visited upper and lower Austria from 10 to 13 September, starting in Wels with visits including Linz, Enns (town), Wallsee, Bacharnsdorf, Rossatz, Traismauer, Tulln, Zeiselmauer and Klosterneuburg. Excursions during the Congress included Carnuntum and its excavations and museum, Vienna (including the Kunsthistorisches Museum and Austrian Academy of Sciences, Höflein Bruck, Stillfried and Niederleis. The post-Congress excursion (22-24 September) went to western Slovakia and south Moravia, visiting sites around Bratislava, Rusovce (Gerulata), Iža (Celamantia), Nitra, Tren, Musov and Devín Castle.

The handbook for the Congress was: M. Kandler and H. Vetters, Der Roemische Limes in Oesterreich (Vienna 1986).

There were over 200 archaeologists and ancient historians from 21 European and overseas countries at the conference. 104 papers were presented from around the Roman Empire, as well as papers on the cultural influences of the Roman military on local populations. 87 papers in three languages (English, German and French) were published in 1990.

=== 15. 1989 Canterbury, UK ===
The 15th Congress took place in Canterbury in England from 2019 September 1989. It was attended by 190 scholars from Europe, the Americas and Middle East. 102 lectures were presented. Excursions included Canterbury, Richborough, Dover Castle, Lympne, London and the Museum of London, Portchester Castle and Pevensey Castle.

The handbook for the Congress was: V. A. Maxfield (ed), The Saxon Shore. A Handbook (Exeter 1989).

In addition to the three geographically arranged sessions there were three thematic sessions: Roman and native in the frontier areas (following on from this topic in 1986 Carnuntum), the realities of life on the frontier, and the problems peculiar to desert frontiers.

There were 190 participants. 100 papers were published in three languages (English, French and German) in the congress proceedings: all but 15 from the Congress, a couple of papers by scholars unable to attend plus reports on some of the poster displays.

=== 16. 1995 Rolduc, Netherlands ===
The 16th Congress took place in Rolduc in the Netherlands from 25 to 31 August 1995. There was a long gap due to the decision to go to the (former) Yugoslavia in 1993 but political circumstances changed the situation.

The pre-Congress excursion went to NW Germany in 22–25 August, visiting early military activities in Germania including Anreppen, Haltern and Kalkriese. The post-Congress excursion (1-2 September) was late Roman sites in Gallia Belgica, visiting Belgium and France (Bavay). During the congress, delegates visited the Rhine Limes in the Netherlands, including Nijmegen, Vechten (Fectio), Alphen aan den Rijn, Zwammerdam and Roman Valkenburg.

The handbook for the Congress was: T. Bechert and W. J. H. Willems, Die Roemische Reichsgrenze zwischen Mosel und Nordsee-Kueste (Stuttgart 1995) in the Theiss series of books on Roman frontiers.

The Congress committee included colleagues from the Netherlands, Belgium, Germany and the UK. Over 200 people attended the Congress from 18 countries in Europe, America, Africa and the Near East. The focus was on themes rather than geographic sessions.

89 papers in three languages (English, French and German) were published in 1997.

=== 17. 1997 Zalău, Romania ===
The 17th Congress took place in Zalău in Romania between 1–10 September 1997. It was attended by 204 delegates from Europe, North America, Australia, Asia and Africa. Over five days 106 lectures were delivered in five sections: I. general reports on the provinces; II. excavations and research on the limes; III. the Roman army and Military History; IV. the daily life of the Roman soldier; V. Romans and barbarians on the frontiers of the empire, with a special focus on the north-western borders of Dacia Porolissensis (Roman Dacia).

The pre-Congress tour was on 30–31 August from Aquincum (Budapest) in Hungary to Porolissum, some 8 km from Zalău. Excursions during the congress included numerous sites on Dacia Porolissensis including Porolissum, Largiana (castra), excavations at Romita (Certinae), the fort at Buciumi and various watch-towers. The post-Congress excursion was on 11 September visiting Cluj-Napoca and Alba Iulia.

There were about 170 participants. 86 papers in three languages (English, German and French) were published in 1999.

=== 18. 2000 Amman, Jordan ===
The 18th Congress was held in Amman in Jordan from 2 to 11 September 2000. This was the first time in over 50 years and 17 previous occasions that the Congress had visited an Arab country and only the second time outside Europe. The Chair of the Congress committee was David Breeze, working with Phil Freeman from the University of Liverpool with support from the Council for British Research in the Levant. The Patron of the Congress was Prince Hassan bin Talal who took a keen interest in the congress together with his daughter Princess Sumaya bint Hassan and invited the entire Congress to a formal dinner on 6 September. Support also came from the Jordanian Department of Antiquities and the Minister of Tourism. Visits during the Congress included Roman Amman, Azraq, Jordan, sections of the Via Traiana Nova, Qasr Bahir and El-Lejjun. Various receptions during the congress were hosted by the British Embassy, the Council for British Research in the Levant, the Department of Antiquities (Jordan) and the American Center of Oriental Research. The post-Congress excursion ran from 10 to 12 September visiting the Roman fort at Da'janiya, Udhruh and Petra.

The handbook for the Congress was: David Kennedy, The Roman Army in Jordan (London 2000).

The Congress was attended by 250 participants from 25 countries, the largest gathering to date. The publication of the proceedings was coordinated by the University of Liverpool with 100 papers (of the 150+ given at the congress) published in three languages (English, German and French).

=== 19. 2003 Pécs, Hungary ===
The 19th Congress took place in Pécs in Hungary from 1–8 September 2003. It was organised by the Department of Ancient History and Archaeology at the University of Pécs and the Patron was Dr Ferenc Mádl, President of the Republic of Hungary. Almost 240 scholars from 27 countries attended the Congress with almost 150 lectures and 20 poster presentations. The focus of the presentations was by theme (Epigraphy, History; How did Frontiers actually work?; Roman Frontiers - Barbarians; Civilians on Frontiers; Material Culture of the Supply, Preparation and Consumption of Food and Drink; Soldiers and Religion; Military Architecture and Material Culture) with the remainder grouped chronologically rather than by province (Archaeological Research).

The pre-Congress tour started in Vienna, Austria, following the completion of the 14th Roman Military Equipment Conference (ROMEC) in that city. Participants visited sites in Austria, Slovakia and Hungary including Devín Castle, Gerulata, exhibitions of Roman carved stones and museums in Mosonmagyaróvár, Komárno and Szentendre, the Roman fort at Quadrata, Iža, Brigetio (Szőny), Tokod and Esztergom. During the congress, delegates visited a number of sites including Szekszárd, Dunaszekcső, the Wosinsky Mór Museum, Lussonium (Dunakömlőd), Intercisa (Dunaújváros), Nagyteteny Roman fort (Campona), Budapest and Aquincum and the Hungarian National Museum. Numerous Roman stones displays were visited, including at Paks and Bölcske. One day saw the delegates go to Croatia to visit some of the sites and sculpture from Osijek and Ilok. Delegates also visited the World Heritage Site in Pécs itself, the early Christian monuments. The post-Congress excursion visited monuments of the Sarmatians on the Great Hungarian Plain and the Móra Ferenc Museum in Szeged,

The handbook was edited by Zsolt Visy: The Roman Army in Pannonia (Pecs 2003).

99 papers in three languages (English, German and French) were published in 2005.

=== 20. 2006 León, Spain ===
The 20th Congress was held in León, Spain from 4–11 September 2006. The president of honour of the Congress was His Majesty the King of Spain and the congress was organised by the Archaeological Area of the Department of Classical Studies at the University of León. 284 delegates attended the congress from 34 different countries. Almost 200 papers were read and 30 posters displayed. Themed sessions at the congress were the Internal Frontiers; the End of the Frontiers and the Barbarians in the Empire; the Spanish Experience: a role model of conquest and occupation; the Fortified Town in the Late Roman period; Soldiers on the Move; the Early Development of Frontiers. There were also regional sessions and one on the Roman army and miscellany. Excursions during the congress included to the city of Zamora, Spain, Astorga, Spain, Gijón including the Campa Torres, the Roman villa of Veranes, Las Médulas and Castro Ventosa, alongside visits to the Roman remains in the city of Leon.

The pre-Congress excursion was on 2–3 September, starting in Madrid and visiting the Roman arch of Medinaceli, Numantia, Peña Redonda, the Numantine Museum of Soria, the military complex at Renieblas, Palencia and Saldaña, Palencia. The post-Congress excursion ran from 12 to 14 September, visiting the hillfort at Viladonga, Lugo, Santiago de Compostela, the fort at A Cidadela, A Coruña including the Tower of Hercules Roman lighthouse and the fort at Baños de Bande.

Angel Morillo and Joaquin Aurrecoechea edited the handbook, The Roman Army in Hispania, An archaeological guide (Leon 2006).

138 papers from the Congress in four languages (English, Spanish, German and French) and in three volumes were published in 2009.

=== 21. 2009 Newcastle, UK ===
The 21st Congress was held in Newcastle upon Tyne from 16 to 26 August 2009. Many of the delegates first attended the 13th Pilgrimage of Hadrian's Wall from 8 to 14 August. A pre-Congress excursion to York took place on 16 August - this was attended by Brenda Swinbank (Heywood) who had also attended the 1949 Congress. Visits during the Congress included Binchester, Piercebridge, Whitley Castle, Malton, North Yorkshire, the late Roman coastal 'signal station' at Scarborough Castle, the Roman camps at Cawthorn, Hardknott Roman Fort, Habitancum (Risingham), Bremenium (High Rochester), Segedunum (Wallsend) and Arbeia (South Shields). Delegates also visited the Great North Museum. There were two parallel post-Congress excursions from 24 to 26 August: to Hadrian's Wall and to Roman Scotland. The Hadrian's Wall excursion visited Coria (Corbridge), Cilurnum (Chesters) and Chesters Bridge, Carrawburgh, Housesteads Roman Fort, Vindolanda, Birdoswald, Tullie House Museum and Art Gallery, Bowness-on-Solway and various stretches of Hadrian's Wall and the Stanegate. Sites visited on the Roman Scotland excursion included Trimontium (Newstead), sites on the Antonine Wall including Watling Lodge, Rough Castle Fort, Seabegs Wood, Bar Hill, Croy Hill and Bearsden Roman bath house. Stretches of the Gask Ridge were also visited including Ardoch Roman Fort, Kirkhill, Muir o'Fauld and Inchtuthil.

The handbook for the Congress was Paul Bidwell and Nick Hodgson, The Roman Army in Northern England (Kendal 2009). N. Hodgson also compiled the handbook for the Pilgrimage of Hadrian's Wall, Hadrian's Wall 1999-2009 (Kendal 2009), and the handbook for the post-Congress tour, Roman Scotland (Newcastle 2009).

There was a delay in publication and 105 papers were published in three languages (English, German and French) in 2017. In addition, one session on Presenting the Roman Frontiers was published separately.

=== 22. 2012 Ruse, Bulgaria ===
The 22nd Congress took place in Ruse, Bulgaria from 6–11 September 2012. During the Congress, delegates visited a number of sites on the frontier in Bulgaria, including Transmariska, Durostorum (Silistra), Sexaginta Prista (Ruse, Bulgaria), Dimum Roman fort and Novae.

The pre-congress excursion ran from 3–5 September 2012. Sites visited included the late antique and medieval site of Cherven (fortress), Nicopolis ad Istrum, Veliko Tarnovo and the fortress of Tsarevets and Archaeological Museum, Sostrus, Oescus, Pleven and the Historical Museum, Pleven Panorama and Storgosia.

There were two post-congress excursions. The first, on 12–14 September, visited Abritus and Razgrad, Madara Rider, Shumen fortress and Historical Museum, Kaliakra, Balchik, Varna and its Archaeological Museum and Roman Baths. The second was a one-day excursion on 15 September to the Tropaeum Traiani in Adamclisi, Romania.

L. Vagalinski, N. Sharabkov and S. Torbatov (eds) prepared a special book on the Lower Danube: The Lower Danube Roman Limes (1st-6th C. AD) (Sofia 2012).

119 papers in three languages (English, German and French) were published in 2015.

=== 23. 2015 Ingolstadt, Germany ===
The 23rd Congress took place in Ingolstadt in Germany from 14 to 20 September 2015 and was organised by the Bavarian State Office for Monument Protection and the German Limes Commission. Excursions during the Congress included the fort at Eining, Weltenburg Abbey and Regensburg. There were eight buses for the 370 delegates (from 30 countries) so for two of the days the delegates selected from a choice of tours along the Raetian Limes. Sites on these various tours included Hesselberg, Ruffenhofen Roman Park, Weißenburg in Bayern, Oberhochstatt, Theilenhofen, Pfünz Roman Fort, Böhming, Pförring, various watch-towers, Manching and the Oppidum of Manching. The pre-Congress excursion took place on 12–13 September and included Künzing, the Römermuseum Boiotro in Passau, the Gäubodenmuseum and St. Peter's Church, Straubing and the Walhalla memorial in Donaustauf. The post-Congress excursion took place from 21 to 23 September and visited the Raetian Limes and Upper Germanic-Rhaetian Limes in Baden-Württemberg. Sites included Rainau-Buch, Dalkingen, Aalen, Schwäbisch Gmünd, Mainhardt fort, Pfahldöben, Osterburken, Aschaffenburg and Pompejanum.

Suzana Matesic and Sebastian Sommer edited the handbook for the Congress, At the Edge of the Roman Empire. Tours along the Limes in Southern Germany.

As was now customary, the majority of the papers were delivered in themed sessions, with a smaller number by province and a good number of posters.

Almost 150 papers were published in two volumes and in three languages (English, German and French) in 2018.

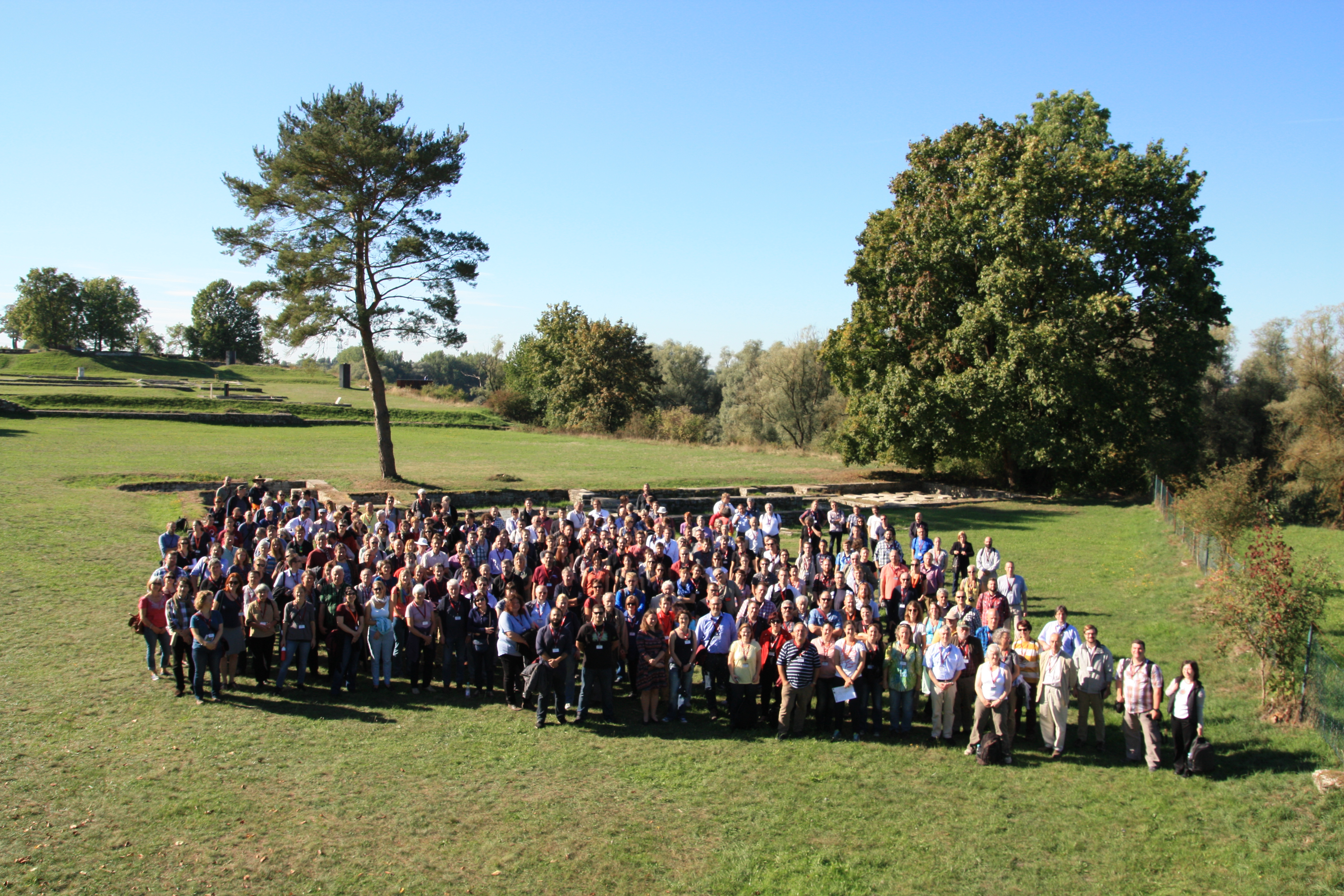

=== 24. 2018 Viminacium, Serbia ===
The 24th Congress took place in Viminacium, Serbia on 2–9 September 2018 organised by the Arheološki Institut / Institute of Archaeology in Serbia. The opening session (2 September) was held in the Faculty of Philology in Belgrade with delegates transferring to Viminacium on 3 September. At Viminacium, lectures took place in a newly constructed replica Roman fort and in a replica Roman villa known as the Domus Scientiarum Viminacium. Delegates were housed either in Viminacium (fort and Domus) or at Silver Lake and Požarevac, travelling to Viminacium daily. There were no pre and post-Congress excursions as the delegates were able to visit the frontier in Serbia (Pannonia and Moesia) on three day-trips during the course of the congress, together with visits to Roman Singidunum and the National Museum of Serbia in Belgrade on the first day. Excursions included the Iron Gates, Lepenski Vir mesolithic settlement, Diana Fortress, (Đerdap) Kladovo, Zaječar Museum, Gamzigrad (Felix Romuliana), Pančevo Museum, Novi Sad Museum of Vojvodina, Sirmium, Justiniana Prima, Leskovac Museum, Mediana, Naissus and the Museum of Niš.

The handbook for the Congress was the Serbian volume in the multi-language series of books on Roman frontiers edited by David J. Breeze and Sonja Jilek: M. Korac, S. Golubovic, N. Mrdic, G. Jeremic and S Pop-Lazic, Frontiers of the Roman Empire, Roman Limes in Serbia (Belgrade 2014).

Sessions again had a thematic focus.

=== 25. 2022 Nijmegen, The Netherlands ===
The 25th Congress took place in Nijmegen, in the Netherlands on 21–28 August 2022 organised by the Municipality of Nijmegen. All the lectures were in The Lindenberg and there were some 420 delegates from 35 countries making it the largest congress yet. The opening session on the 21 August featured several papers giving an overview of the Lower German Limes, newly inscribed as a World Heritage Site by UNESCO in 2021. So many papers were offered that six session ran concurrently with themes including small finds, desert frontiers, river frontiers, dress, imperialism, frontier collapse, resources (organic and metals), funerary archaeology, the republic, management and digital Limes, and general and provincial sessions. There were two excursions (with eight coaches) during the congress. The first went across the border to Germany with delegates visiting sites at Xanten and the Xanten Archeology Park via the newly discovered Roman camps at Uedem with options to also visit the Roman fort at Meinerswijk. The second went to the Castellum Hoge Woerd in De Meern where a Roman barge excavated at Zwammerdam was on display in the museum. Delegates also had the option of visiting the Roman fort at Nigrum Pullum (Zwammerdam) or Fort Vechten. All delegates finished up at Museum Park Archeon where there was a reception with local mayors signing an agreement to work towards the creation of a Roman ship museum at the Park to house the Zwammerdam Roman barges.

There wasn't a handbook produced for the Congress but delegates were treated to the latest five books in the Frontiers of the Roman Empire series created by David Breeze and published by Archaeopress, together with a newly created History of the Congress of Roman Frontier Studies created to mark the 25th Congress in Nijmegen.

=== 26. 2024 Batumi, Georgia ===
The 26th Congress took place in Batumi on the Black Sea in Georgia on 8–14 September 2024. It was hosted in the Shota Rustaveli State University in Batumi and organised by the Cultural Heritage Agency of Ajara together with the University of Warsaw and Ajara Museums. There were around 370 delegates from 42 countries. The opening session on the 8 September was at the Courtyard by Marriott Batumi Hotel followed by a performance of Ajara music and dance in the Batumi Summer theatre and a Georgian feast. The congress saw six sessions run concurrently over three days of lectures with themes including aspects of the frontiers and borderlands of the Roman Empire including beyond the frontier and interactions, religion and ritual, late antique, climate change, river frontiers, arms and armour, handicrafts, roads, death and burial, hoards, coins, re-evaluating older excavations, propaganda and regional sessions including one comparing the imperial frontiers of Rome, Persia and China. Delegates had choices of excursions over two days which included the Khariton Akhvlediani Museum, the Museum of Religion, Vani archaeological site and museum and the Ethnographical Museum "Borjgalo". All delegates met on the first day at the Petra fortress and the second at the Fort of Gonio Apsarus where they were treated to a Roman festival.

=== 27. 2027 Rabat, Morocco ===
The 27th congress is planned for 5 - 11 September 2027, hosted by the Institut National des Sciences de l'Archéologie et du Patrimoine (INSAP) in Rabat, Morocco. It will be the first congress to take place in north Africa.

== Limes Congress Proceedings ==
The responsibility for publishing each Congress lies with the Congress organising committee from the country (or countries) hosting the Congress. The aim is to have each congress published in time for the next Congress (usually around three years apart).

Published Congresses:

1. Eric Birley, The Congress of Roman Frontier Studies 1949 (Durham 1952)

2. Erich Swoboda, Carnuntina, Römische Forschungen in Niederösterreich (Graz-Köln 1956)

3. Rudolf Laur-Belart (eds), Limes-Studien, Vorträge des 3. Internationalen Limes-Kongresses in Rheinfel den/ Basel 1957, Verlag des Institutes für Ur- und Frühgeschichte der Schweiz Rheinsprung 20 (Basel 1959)

4. Unpublished

5. Grga Novak (eds) Quintus Congresses Internationalis Limitis Romani Studiosorum, Acta et Dissertationes Archaelogicae III (Zagreb 1963)

6. Hans Schönberger (ed.) Studien zu den Militärgrenzen Roms, Vorträge des 6 Internationalen Limeskongresses in Suddeutschland, Beihefte der Bonner Jahrbucher Band 19 (1967)

7. Shimon Applebaum (ed.) Roman Frontier Studies 1967 (Tel Aviv 1971)

8. Eric Birley, Brian Dobson and Michael Jarrett (eds) Roman Frontier Studies 1969 (Cardiff 1974)

9. D M Pippidi (ed.) Actes du IXe Congrès International d'études sur les Frontières Romaines (Bucuresti 1974)

10. Dorothea Haupt and Heinz Günter Horn (eds) Studien zu den Militärgrenzen Roms II, Vorträge des 10 Internationalen Limeskongresses in Der Germania Inferior (Cologne 1977)

11. Jenö Fitz (ed.) Limes. Akten des XI. Internationalen Limeskongresses (Budapest 1977)

12. William Hanson and Lawrence Keppie (eds) Roman Frontier Studies 1979 (BAR, Oxford 1980)

13. Christoph Unz (ed.) Studien zu den Militärgrenzen Roms III. 13. Internationaler Limeskongreß Aalen 1983 (Stuttgart 1986)

14. Hermann Vetters und Manfred Kandler (eds) Akten des 14. Internationalen Limeskongresses 1986 in Carnuntum, Der Römische Limes in Osterreich Heft 36/1 (Wien 1990)

15. Valerie Maxfield and Michael Dobson (eds) Roman Frontier Studies 1989 (Exeter 1991)

16. W Groenman-van Waateringe, B L van Beck, Willem J H Willems, S L Wynia (eds) Roman Frontier Studies 1995 (Oxford 1997)

17. Nicolae Gudea (ed.) Roman Frontier Studies. Proceedings of the XVIIth International Congress of Roman Frontier Studies (Zalau 1999)

18. Philip Freeman, Julian Bennett, Zbigniew T. Fiema, Birgitta Hoffmann (eds) Limes XVIII Proceedings of the XVIIIth International Congress of Roman Frontier Studies held in Amman, Jordan (September 2000) (BAR International Series 1084, Oxford 2002)

19. Zsolt Visy (ed) Limes XIX. Proceedings of the XIXth International Congress of Roman Frontier Studies, Pécs, Hungary, September 2003 (Pécs 2005)

20. Angel Morillo, Norbert Hanel and Esperanza Martin (eds) Limes XX. Estudios Sobre la Fronters Romana. Roman Frontier Studies. Anejos de Gladius. (Madrid 2009)

21. Nick Hodgson, Paul Bidwell and Judith Schachtmann (eds) Roman Frontier Studies 2009. Proceedings of the XXI International Congress of Roman Frontier Studies (Limes Congress) held at Newcastle upon Tyne in August 2009. Archaeopress Roman Archaeology 25. (Oxford 2017)

22. Lyudmil Vagalinski and Nicolay Sharankov (eds) Limes XXII. Proceedings of the 22nd International Congress of Roman Frontier Studies Ruse, Bulgaria, September 2012. (Sofia 2015)

23. C. Sebastian Sommer and Suzana Matesic (hrsg.) Limes XXIII. Proceedings of the 23rd International Congress of Roman Frontier Studies Ingolstadt 2015. Akten des 23. Internationalen Limeskongresses in Ingolstadt 2015. Beiträge zum Welterbe Limes. (Mainz 2018)

24. Snežana Golubović (ed.) Limes XXIIII. Proceedings of the 24th International Congress of Roman Frontier Studies. Belgrade - Viminacium, Serbia, 2nd September - 9th September 2018. (Belgrade 2023)

25. Harry van Enckevort, Mark Driessen, Erik Graafstal, Tom Hazenberg, Tatiana Ivleva and Carol van Driel-Murray (eds) Limes XXV. Proceedings of the 25th International Congress of Roman Frontier Studies. (Leiden 2024)

26. In preparation

== Bibliography ==
Anthony Birley, Fifty years of Roman frontier studies. In: Ph. Freeman, J. Bennett, Z. T. Fiema, B. Hoffmann (Hrsg.), Limes XVIII. Proceedings of the XVIIIth International Congress of Roman Frontier Studies held in Amman, Jordan (September 2000). BAR International Series 1084 (Oxford 2002) 1–10.

David Breeze. Foreword. In: N. Hodgson, P. Bidwell and J. Schachtmann (eds), Roman Frontier Studies 2009. Proceedings of the XXI International Congress of Roman Frontier Studies (Limes Congress) held at Newcastle upon Tyne in August 2009 (Oxford 2017) ix-x.

David Breeze, Tatiana Ivleva, Rebecca Jones and Andreas Thiel, A History of the Congress of Roman Frontier Studies 1949-2024. (Archaeopress, Oxford, 2024).

Peter Henrich, '23. Internationaler Limeskongress 2015 in Ingolstadt in Bayern' Der Limes 7, 2013/1, S. 36–37

Simon James, Limesfreunde in Philadelphia: a snapshot of the State of Roman Frontier Studies. Britannia XXXVI, 2005, 499–502.

Hans Schönberger, 'Eröffnungsansprache zum 13. Limeskongreß in Aalen 1983' in C. Unz (ed.) Studien zu den Militärgrenzen Roms III (Stuttgart 1986), 15–16.

Simon Sulk, 'Von Newcastle nach Ingolstadt – Der XXIII. Internationale Limeskongress findet 2015 in Bayern statt', Berichte der bayerischen Bodendenkmalpflege 54, 2013, S. 183–190.
