= Tarzan and the Slave Girl =

1950 film by Lee Sholem

- Film poster
- Directed by: Lee Sholem
- Written by: Arnold Belgard; Hans Jacoby
- Based on: Characters created by Edgar Rice Burroughs
- Produced by: Sol Lesser
- Starring: Lex Barker; Vanessa Brown; Robert Alda
- Cinematography: Russell Harlan
- Edited by: Christian Nyby
- Music by: Paul Sawtell
- Distributed by: RKO Pictures
- Release date: March 15, 1950
- Running time: 74 minutes
- Country: United States
- Language: English

Tarzan and the Slave Girl is a 1950 American adventure film directed by Lee Sholem and starring Lex Barker as Tarzan, Vanessa Brown as Jane and Robert Alda as big-game hunter Neil. The film is the 14th of the Tarzan film series that began with 1932's Tarzan the Ape Man. The plot involves a lost civilization in Africa, a strange illness and an evil counselor manipulating a prince into kidnapping large numbers of local women.

The film was Barker's second portrayal of Tarzan and Brown's only outing as Jane. it was followed by Tarzan's Peril in 1951.

== Plot ==
Tarzan and Jane are spending time by a river when they hear a scream. A local tribal girl has gone missing, and the tribesmen believe that it is the work of an evil spirit. Tarzan and Jane quickly realize that the girl has been kidnapped. The kidnappers are Lionians, a lost culture of men with a culture similar to that of ancient Egypt and who worship lions. The Lionians are kidnapping girls throughout the region and taking them to their city deep in the jungle. They have also brought a terrible disease that can kill within hours. Tarzan seeks the help of Dr. Campbell, who has a serum that can both cure the disease as well as vaccinate against it. After saving the local tribe, Dr. Campbell and Tarzan (with the help of Neil, a drunken big-game hunter) travel to the Lionian city.

Dr. Campbell's native assistant, the buxom blonde Lola, is in love with Tarzan. Jane and Lola have a catfight and are then captured by a Lionian raiding party.

Tarzan and the others are repeatedly attacked by other tribes and the Lionians as they search for Lionia. Neil suffers an injured leg and is left behind. Dr. Campbell unknowingly drops his bottle of serum, although Neil discovers it later as he follows Tarzan and Campbell.

Jane and Lola are taken to the Lionian capital. The Lionian king has recently died of the horrible disease, leaving the prince in charge. He is easily swayed by the evil counselor Sengo, who has persuaded the prince to indulge every lust for food, drink and women to assuage his grief. The illness has killed many Lionian women, leading the menfolk to capture local beauties as concubines. When the Lionian high priest challenges Sengo, he convinces the prince that the priest is a rebel and should be fed to the lions. Sengo assumes the duties of the high priest. The prince admires Lola but leaves to see his sick son. Lola taunts Sengo that he will suffer when she is queen. He has her whipped and, in a scuffle, Jane stabs him in the arm with his own knife and the two girls flee into the dead queen's tomb (which is in the dead king's stone mausoleum), where Sengo discovers them and entombs them alive.

Tarzan arrives at Lionia with Campbell. The prince's son has fallen ill with the disease, and Sengo blames Tarzan and Neil. Their deaths are ordered, but Tarzan escapes and leads the Lionians on a merry chase through their own city. Tarzan hides inside the dead king's sarcophagus but becomes entombed in the stone mausoleum as well. Tarzan discovers where Jane and Lola have been held and frees them. Neil arrives with the serum and they treat the prince's son. While Sengo prepares to throw the old high priest to the lions, Tarzan calls for help and an elephant breaks the tomb's door to free Tarzan, Jane and Lola. Tarzan repels the Lionians and throws Sengo into the pit with the lions. The prince's son is cured, and the prince, realizing how wrong he has been, orders the high priest, Tarzan, all of Tarzan's friends and all of the slave girls freed.

== Cast ==
- Lex Barker as Tarzan
- Vanessa Brown as Jane
- Robert Alda as Neil
- Hurd Hatfield as Prince of the Lionians
- Arthur Shields as Dr. E.E. Campbell
- Anthony Caruso as Sengo (billed as Tony Caruso)
- Denise Darcel as Lola
- Robert Warwick as High Priest
- Alfonso Pedroza as Nagasi Chief (uncredited)
- Satini Pualoa as Medicine Man (uncredited)
- Tito Renaldo as Chief's Son (uncredited)
- Phil Harron as Lionian (uncredited)
- Peter Mamakos as Lionian Henchman (uncredited)
- Tom Hernández as Molo

== Production ==
Production of the film was announced on June 23, 1949, after producer Sol Lesser signed a new distribution agreement for his "Tarzan" pictures with RKO Pictures. The working title of the film had been Tarzan and the Golden Lion. But the June 23 announcement changed it to Tarzan and the Slave Girl and also named Lex Barker as the star. On July 16, French actress Denise Darcel was cast as the slave girl. Vanessa Brown was signed to play Jane two weeks later. Hans Jacoby, who had scripted the highly popular Tarzan and the Amazons, turned in the screenplay for the film.

Some location shooting was done in Baldwin Park, California, the Los Angeles County Arboretum and Botanic Garden, and the Iverson Movie Ranch. But most of the filming was done on the RKO Forty Acres backlot.

The film marked Brown's only outing as Jane. According to director Lee Sholem, producer Sol Lesser was looking to cast a new "Jane" to replace actress Brenda Joyce, who had portrayed Jane in the five previous films. Sholem brought Marilyn Monroe out to see Lesser, but Lesser thought she was too much of a bombshell for the part. Sholem brought Monroe to see Lesser eight times in all, but in the end Lesser settled on Vanessa Brown. Brown had been a popular performer on the Quiz Kids radio show, and at age 21 already had a six-year acting career which included a number of prominent roles in important films. Signed by 20th Century Fox, she'd been loaned out to RKO several times. But Fox had cancelled her contract in early 1950. She took the role in RKO's Tarzan and the Slave Girl because she needed the money. She later recalled, "My intellectual friends said, 'My God, what you won't do for money.' I needed a job, I had to pay the rent." Lesser picked Brown because of her Quiz Kid background. Director Sholem found her pompous:

There was a situation one day where she had about three words to say, and she asked, "What is the underlying meaning of this?" In a Tarzan picture [laughs]! "What is my feeling here? What is my attitude?" Oh, you never heard such shit!

The slave girl in the title is Lola, played by Denise Darcel. Although previous films had made it clear that Tarzan and Jane were husband and wife, this film depicted Jane as Tarzan's girlfriend—which allowed Lola to compete for Tarzan's affections without implying that she was an adulterer. Mary Ellen Kay has an uncredited role as the slave girl who is engaged to the Prince, while Eva Gabor also has a non-speaking background role as a slave girls.

Suffering from Parkinson's disease and having already had several heart attacks, Tarzan creator Edgar Rice Burroughs visited the set during production. It was one of his last public appearances, according to Burrough's daughter, Joan. Burroughs died on March 19, 1950, just four days after the film's release.

== Critical reception ==
Generally speaking, the film received only mediocre reviews from film critics, who felt the plot was silly and that Brown was a poor substitute for Joyce as "Jane." The New York Times called the film "painful" to watch, and said, "About the only novelty the picture offers is Cheeta's encounter with a bottle of whisky, and even that isn't very funny."
