= Lisa Lodwick =

British archaeologist (1988–2022)

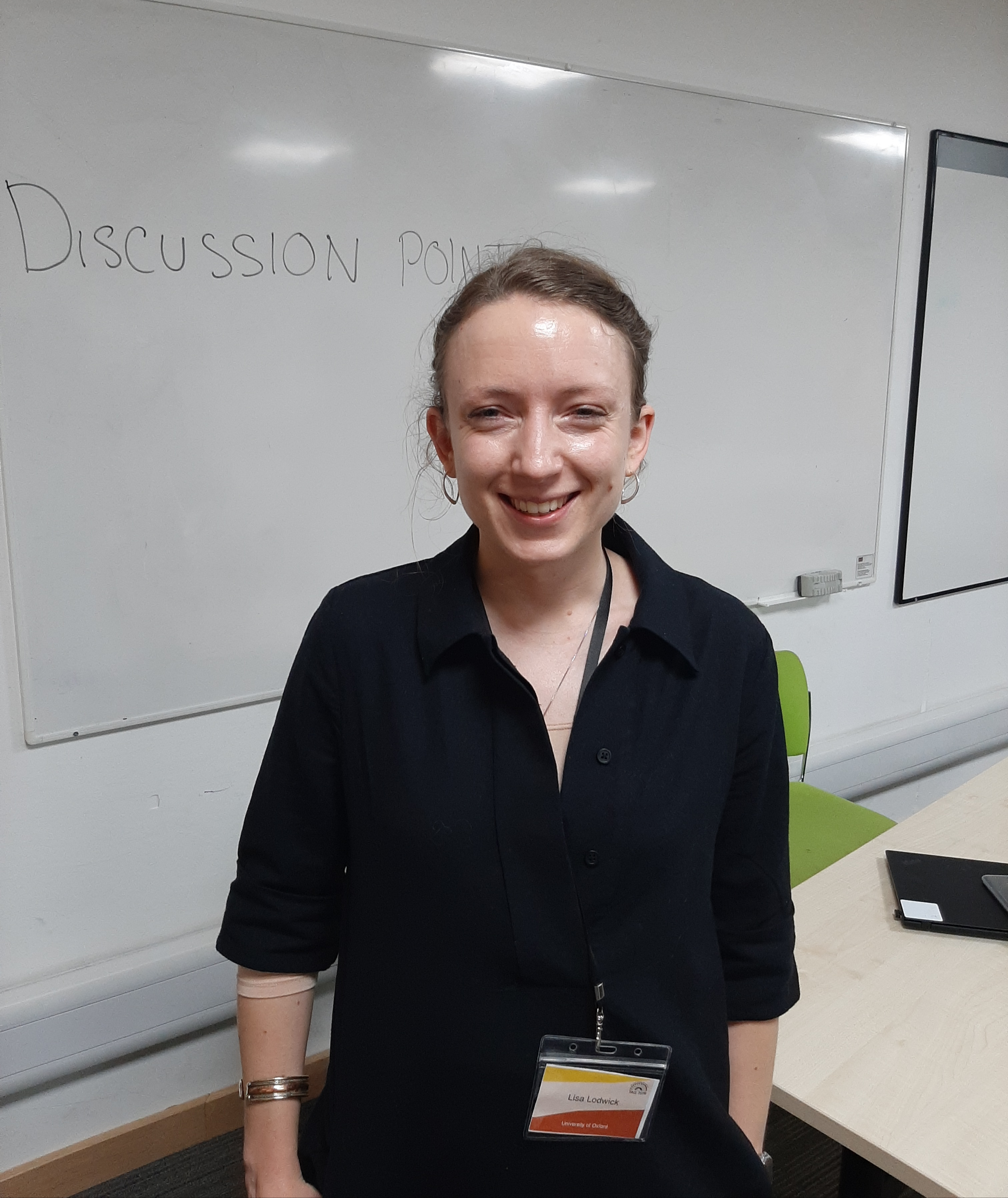
- Lodwick in 2019
- Born: 21 July 1988
- Died: 3 November 2022 (aged 34)
- Education: University of Oxford
- Awards: 2020 Book of the Year (Archaeology Awards)
- Scientific career
- Fields: Archaeology
- Workplaces: All Souls College, Oxford
- Thesis: An Archaeobotanical Analysis of Silchester and the wider region across the Late Iron Age - Roman Transition (2014)
- Doctoral advisor: Mark Robinson
- Website: Official website

Lisa Ann Lodwick FSA (21 July 1988 – 3 November 2022) was a British archaeologist who studied charred, mineralised and waterlogged macroscopic plant remains, and used carbon and nitrogen stable isotope analysis to understand the crop husbandry practices of the ancient Romans.

Lodwick's pioneering archaeobotanical studies at Calleva Atrebatum demonstrated the import and consumption of celery, coriander and olives in Insula IX prior to the Claudian Conquest. She jointly won the 2020 Book of the Year Award at the Archaeology Awards for Life and death in the countryside of Roman Britain.

== Education ==
Lodwick studied archaeology and anthropology at Hertford College, Oxford. She graduated in 2009 and was awarded the Meyerstein Prize for best overall performance in the School of Archaeology. In 2010, she completed a Master's Degree in European archaeology, also at Hertford College. She went on to receive a Doctor of Philosophy (DPhil) degree from the School of Archaeology in 2014. Her doctoral thesis was titled An archaeobotanical analysis of Silchester and the wider region across the late Iron Age-Roman transition.

== Academic career ==
Lodwick held post-doctoral research positions at the University of Reading from 2014 to 2017 and later at All Souls College, Oxford. She was due to start a position as a lecturer in environmental archaeology at the University of Cambridge in 2022.

Lodwick was elected a Fellow of the Society of Antiquaries of London in November 2018.

=== Research ===
Lodwick co-authored the second and third books in the "New Visions of the Countryside of Roman Britain" monograph series published by the Society for the Promotion of Roman Studies. The third volume, Life and Death in the Countryside of Roman Britain, was written with Alexander Smith, Martyn Allen, Tom Brindle, Michael Fulford, and Anna Rohnbogner, and won the Current Archaeology's 2020 Book of the Year Award.

An advocate of open access publication in archaeology, Lodwick was a co-founder and editor-in-chief of the Theoretical Roman Archaeology Journal, published by the Open Library of Humanities, and a member of the editorial board of the journal Britannia published by the Society for the Promotion of Roman Studies.

== Death ==
Lodwick died on 3 November 2022, at the age of 34, from breast cancer.

== Select publications ==
- Lodwick, L. (2019). "Agendas for Archaeobotany in the 21st Century: data, dissemination and new directions". Internet Archaeology. 53 (53). doi:10.11141/ia.53.7.
- Lodwick, L. (2019). "Farming practice, ecological temporality, and urban communities at a late Iron Age oppidum". Journal of Social Archaeology. 19 (2): 206–228. doi:10.1177/1469605319837766. S2CID 150434911.
- Lodwick, L. A. (2018). "Arable weed seeds as indicators of regional cereal provenance: a case study from Iron Age and Roman central-southern Britain" (PDF). Vegetation History and Archaeobotany. 27 (6): 801–815. Bibcode:2018VegHA..27..801L. doi:10.1007/s00334-018-0674-y. ISSN 0939-6314. S2CID 134036960.
- Smith, A.; Allen, M.; Brindle, T.; Fulford, M.; Lodwick, L; Rohnbogner, A (2018). "New visions of the countryside of Roman Britain volume 3: life and death in the countryside of Roman Britain". Britannia Monographs Series. 31. London: Society for the Promotion of Roman Studies: 437. ISBN 9780907764465.
- Lodwick, L. A. (2017). "Agricultural innovations at a Late Iron Age oppidum: archaeobotanical evidence for flax, food and fodder from Calleva Atrebatum, UK". Quaternary International. 460: 198–219. Bibcode:2017QuInt.460..198L. doi:10.1016/j.quaint.2016.02.058. ISSN 1040-6182.
- Lodwick, L. A. (2017). "Evergreen plants in Roman Britain and beyond: movement, meaning and materiality" (PDF). Britannia. 48: 135–173. doi:10.1017/S0068113X17000101. ISSN 1753-5352. S2CID 59323545.
- Allen, M.; Lodwick, L.; Brindle, T.; Fulford, M; Smith, A. (2017). "New visions of the countryside of Roman Britain volume 2: the rural economy of Roman Britain". Britannia Monograph Series. 30. London: Society for the Promotion of Roman Studies: 480. ISBN 9780907764441.
- Lodwick, L. A. (2017). "'The debatable territory where geology and archaeology meet': reassessing the early archaeobotanical work of Clement Reid and Arthur Lyell at Roman Silchester" (PDF). Environmental Archaeology. 22 (1): 56–78. Bibcode:2017EnvAr..22...56L. doi:10.1080/14614103.2015.1116218. ISSN 1461-4103. S2CID 162420770.
