= Current Publishing (UK) =

British archaeology and history magazine publisher

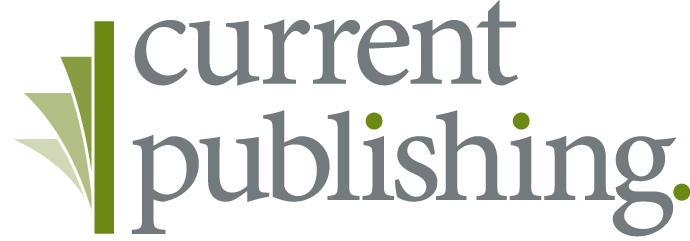
- Company type: Publishing Company
- Industry: Magazines, Publishing
- Founded: 1998
- Founder: Andrew Selkirk
- Headquarters: London
- Area served: Worldwide
- Products: Magazines
- Website: currentpublishing.com

Current Publishing is a British magazine publishing company based in Chiswick, London.

== Summary ==
Current Publishing was founded in 1998. The company publishes five titles: Current Archaeology, Current World Archaeology, Military History Matters, Minerva, and Ancient Egypt Magazine in addition to several online services dedicated to archaeology, heritage, and sites of historical significance.

Current Publishing was founded by Andrew Selkirk, a Fellow of the Society of Antiquaries and former Vice-President of the Royal Archaeological Institute, who launched the first magazine, Current Archaeology, in 1967. For its first 40 years, the publication was bi-monthly, becoming a monthly in 2007 up until the present day. Current Archaeology now has over 14,000 subscribers worldwide.

Current World Archaeology was launched in 2003, with an international focus on archaeology from the first emergence of man down to the present day. There are six editions published per year.

Military History Matters was added to Current Publishing’s roster in October 2010 as Military Times before obtaining its current title in January 2019. It is edited by Laurence Earle, and covers all aspects of military history, from battles of the ancient world, up to more recent conflicts in Iraq and Afghanistan. There are 6 editions published each year.

Minerva, a magazine devoted to the art and archaeology of the ancient world, joined Current Publishing in 2020 but ceased publishing in 2023.

Ancient Egypt Magazine which focusses on the history, people and culture of the Nile Valley, was added in 2022.

== Media ==
In addition to the physical publications, Current Publishing has several websites intended to complement the magazines with further information and discussion forums. Archaeology Live is a major annual conference presenting the latest annual discoveries in archaeology, while The Past is the official digital platform for all of the Current Publishing titles.

== Team ==
Rob Selkirk is the present Managing Director, Libby Selkirk is the Commercial Director and Andrew Selkirk is the Editorial Director. The offices are situated in London.
