= Rebecca Wragg Sykes =

Archaeologist

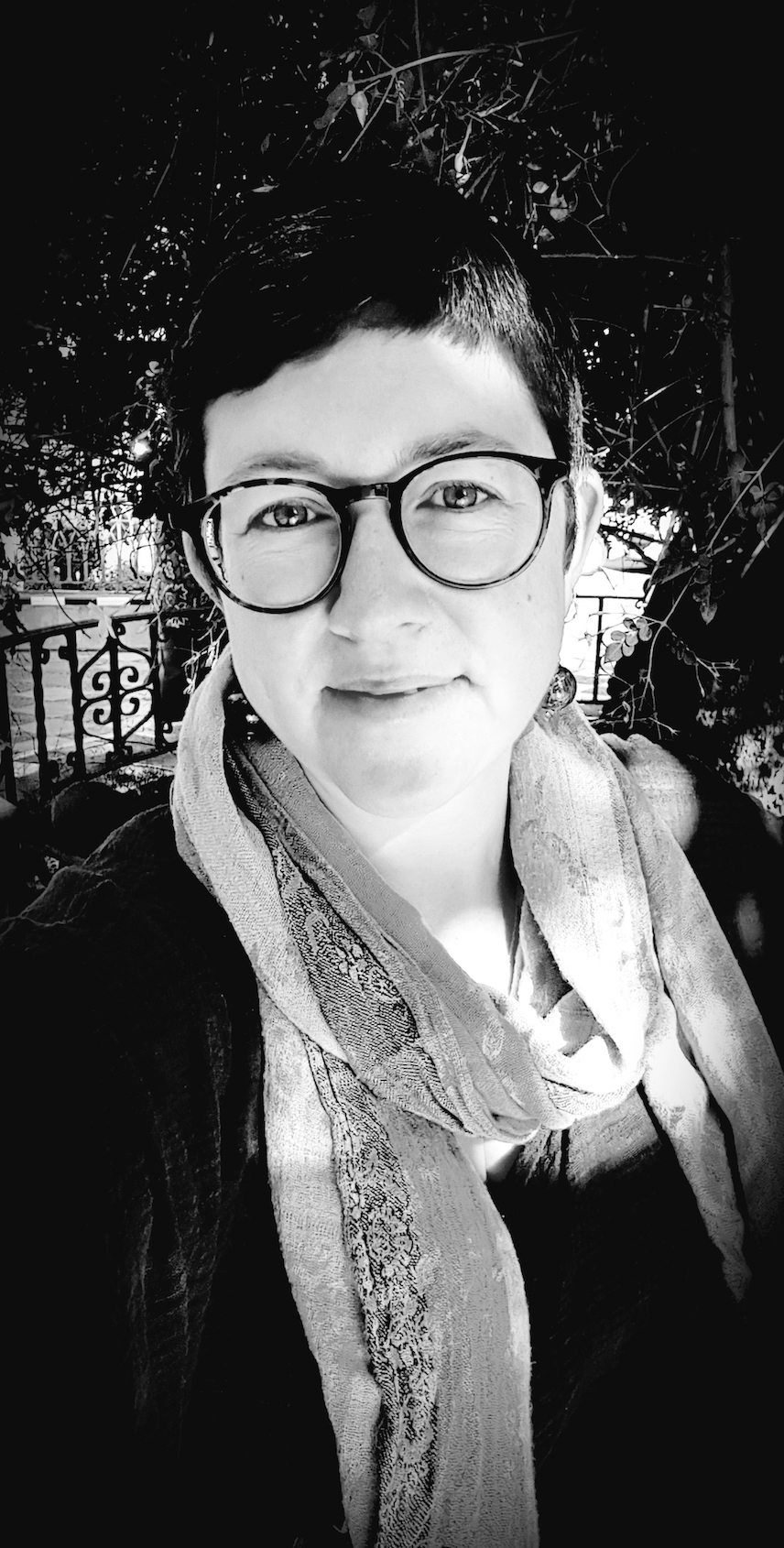
- Wragg Sykes in 2021
- Education: University of Bristol (BA), University of Southampton (MA), University of Sheffield (PhD)
- Occupations: Paleolithic archaeologist, broadcaster, writer
- Known for: Middle Palaeolithic studies, Neanderthal research, co-founding TrowelBlazers
- Notable work: Kindred: Neanderthal Life, Love, Death and Art

Rebecca Wragg Sykes is a British paleolithic archaeologist, broadcaster, popular science writer and author who lives in Wales. She is interested in the Middle Palaeolithic, specifically in the lives of Neanderthals; and she is one of the founders of TrowelBlazers, a website set up to celebrate the lives of women in archaeology, palaeontology and geology. She is a patron of Humanists UK.

== Career ==
Wragg Sykes studied as an undergraduate at the University of Bristol, before gaining her BA in Archaeology in 2003, and MA in the Archaeology of Human Origins from the University of Southampton in 2004. Her doctoral thesis from the University of Sheffield, which examined evidence for late Neanderthals in Britain, was awarded in 2010.

Following her Ph.D, Wragg Sykes was awarded a Marie Curie postdoctoral fellowship at Université de Bordeaux, working in the PACEA laboratory on Neanderthal and prehistoric sites in the Massif Central mountains. She is currently an Honorary Fellow in the School of Archaeology, Classics and Egyptology at the University of Liverpool, and chercheur bénévole (Honorary Fellow) at the Université de Bordeaux.

== Science communication ==
Wragg Sykes has written for The Guardian, Scientific American and Aeon, and appeared on history and science programmes for BBC Radio 3 and Radio 4.

In 2020, Wragg Sykes published Kindred: Neanderthal Life, Love, Death and Art which won the 2021 Current Archaeology Book of the Year Award, the 2021 Hessel-Tiltman History Prize, the 2022 Public Anthropology Award from the Royal Anthropological Institute of Great Britain and Ireland and the 2022 President's Award from The Prehistoric Society. Kindred: Neanderthal Life, Love Death and Art was also a finalist in the 2022 Premio Galileo Awards and has been favourably reviewed by Current Archaeology, London Review of Books, Nature, The Guardian and The New York Times; reviews have been published in other media outlets as well.

Yuval Noah Harari, author of the bestseller Sapiens: A Brief History of Humankind, thought Wragg Sykes had done "a remarkable job synthesizing thousands of academic studies into a single accessible narrative". Alice Roberts, author and presenter of the television series The Incredible Human Journey, said it was "a wonderful portrait of these enigmatic, long-lost relatives". Writing in The Sunday Times about the best philosophy and ideas books of the year 2020, James McConnachie praised how it reveals the latest theories about Neanderthal life, from the tools they used to the funerals they performed.

Wragg Sykes has also written for DK and was one of the authors for the book Big History, although she and the other authors were "aligned with" the OER Project rather than members of the organization.

== TrowelBlazers ==
In 2013, Wragg Sykes started, together with other female scientists, the TrowelBlazers project, a public-led experiment in participatory archaeology, originating from the lack of visibility of women in science. TrowelBlazers has highlighted women from the fields of archaeology, geology and palaeontology.
