= Christina Riggs =

Historian of archaeology, photography and ancient Egyptian art

Professor Christina Riggs
- Born: Ohio, United States
- Title: Professor of the History of Visual Culture, Department of History, Durham University

Academic background
- Education: Brown University; University of California, Berkeley; University of Oxford

Academic work
- Discipline: History
- Sub-discipline: History of archaeology; history of photography; ancient Egyptian art

Christina Riggs is a British-American historian, academic, and former museum curator. She specializes in the history of archaeology, history of photography, and ancient Egyptian art, and her recent work has concentrated on the history, politics, and contemporary legacy of the 1922 discovery of Tutankahmun's tomb. Since 2019, she has been Professor of the History of Visual Culture at Durham University. She is also a former Fellow of All Souls College, Oxford. The author of several academic books, Riggs also writes on ancient Egyptian themes for a wider audience. Her most recent books include Ancient Egyptian Magic: A Hands-On Guide and Treasured: How Tutankhamun Shaped a Century.

== Early life and education ==
Born in Ohio, United States, Riggs was an undergraduate at Brown University from 1989 to 1993. Having majored in archaeology, she graduated with a Bachelor of Arts (BA) degree in 1993. She then studied ancient Mediterranean archaeology and art at the University of California, Berkeley, completing her Master of Arts (MA) degree in 1995. After further studies in art history at Harvard University, she moved to England to join the University of Oxford as a doctoral student in Oriental Studies (Egyptology), under the supervision of John Baines and Helen Whitehouse. At Oxford, she was a member of Somerville College and The Queen's College. She completed her Doctor of Philosophy (DPhil) degree in 2001, with a thesis on funerary art in Roman Egypt.

== Academic career ==
From 2000 to 2003, Riggs was the Barns and Griffith Research Fellow at The Queen's College, Oxford. She then joined the Manchester Museum, part of the University of Manchester, where she was curator of its Egyptian collection from 2004 to 2006; this led to her book Unwrapping Ancient Egypt. From 2006 to 2007, she was museum education development officer in the Faculty of Classics, University of Cambridge.

In 2007, Riggs was appointed a lecturer (assistant professor) in art history at the University of East Anglia (UEA). She was promoted to senior lecturer in 2013, and reader (associate professor) in 2015. In 2018, she was appointed Professor of the History of Art and Archaeology. In 2019, she was elected to the chair in the History of Visual Culture in the Department of History, Durham University, a post previously held by Professor Ludmila Jordanova.

Riggs has held posts at All Souls College, Oxford, where in 2012, she delivered the Evans-Pritchard Lectures, in a series entitled "Unwrapping Ancient Egypt: The Shroud, the Secret, and the Sacred". She was a visiting fellow in 2015, and was elected a Two-Year Fellow in 2018. She has held research grants from the Arts and Humanities Research Council (AHRC), the Leverhulme Trust, and the British Academy.

With support from the British Academy and in collaboration with the Griffith Institute, Oxford University, Riggs curated an exhibition called Photographing Tutankhamun, shown at The Collection, Lincoln in 2017-18 and the Museum of Archaeology and Anthropology, Cambridge, in 2018.

== Honours ==
Riggs was elected a Fellow of the Society of Antiquaries of London (FSA) on 5 March 2009.

Riggs' monograph Unwrapping Ancient Egypt was named a runner-up in the 2015 BKFS prize for books in Middle Eastern Studies, and long-listed for the Textile Society of America's R. L. Shep Ethnic Textiles award.

== Selected works ==
- Riggs, Christina (2006). The Beautiful Burial in Roman Egypt: Art, Identity, and Funerary Religion. Oxford: Oxford University Press. ISBN 978-0199276653.
- Riggs, Christina, ed. (2012). The Oxford Handbook of Roman Egypt. Oxford: Oxford University Press. ISBN 978-0199571451.
- Riggs, Christina (2014). Unwrapping Ancient Egypt. London: Bloomsbury Academic. ISBN 978-0857855398.
- Riggs, Christina (2014). Ancient Egyptian Art and Architecture: A Very Short Introduction. Oxford: Oxford University Press. ISBN 978-0199682782.
- Riggs, Christina (2017). Egypt: Lost Civilizations. London: Reaktion Books. ISBN 978-1780237268.
- Riggs, Christina (2017). Tutankhamun: The Original Photographs. Wales: Rupert Wace Ancient Art/The Gower Press. ISBN 978-0957506442.
- Riggs, Christina (2019). Photographing Tutankhamun: Archaeology, Ancient Egypt, and the Archive. London: Bloomsbury Academic. ISBN 978-1350038523.
- Riggs, Christina (2020). Ancient Egyptian Magic: A Hands-On Guide. London: Thames & Hudson; Cairo and New York: AUC Press. ISBN 978-0500052129.
- Riggs, Christina (2021). Treasured: How Tutankhamun Shaped a Century. London: Atlantic Books. ISBN 9781838950514.
