= Paul Bidwell =

British archaeologist (1949–2022)

Paul Thomas Bidwell OBE FSA (16 June 1949 – 5 November 2022) was a British archaeologist specialising in Roman Britain, Roman pottery, Hadrian's Wall and the Roman army in Britain.

== Biography ==
Bidwell was a graduate of the University of Exeter in 1971 where he studied law. Shortly after graduation, he worked as a site assistant for Exeter Museums Archaeological Field Unit on the legionary fortress of Exeter. By 1974, he was assistant director of the unit and published the excavations in 1979.

Bidwell moved to northern England in 1980 to excavate at the fort of Vindolanda on Hadrian's Wall. Following work on the Roman bridges of the Wall, he started working at Arbeia, South Shields Roman fort in 1983 for the Tyne and Wear Museums service where he remained until his retirement in 2013. At Tyne & Wear Archives & Museums, Bidwell recognised the importance of presenting the sites to their surrounding urban communities and was instrumental in the building of the replica gate (1988), barracks and commanding officer's house (2001) at Arbeia, South Shields Roman fort as well as a section of the Wall at Wallsend (1994) and replica Roman baths at Segedunum / Wallsend Roman fort (2000). In the 1980s and 1990s, Arbeia, South Shields became a training ground for archaeologists and the socially inclusive excavations he led were a forerunner to what is now called Community archaeology. This was recognised in the award of an OBE for services to heritage in the 2012 New Year Honours.

In addition to running the archaeology team, Bidwell made a significant contribution to museology, especially at Arbeia and he led the development for the new museum at Segedunum in the 1990s, opening in 2000.

The opportunity of developer-funded archaeology in the 1990s led to the creation of TWM Archaeology as a full-scale commercial contracting unit, whose activities supplemented the capital development projects and research at South Shields and Wallsend. In 2009, TWM Archaeology hosted the 21st International Congress of Roman Frontier Studies in Newcastle upon Tyne.

Bidwell helped found the Arbeia Society in 1991 and to celebrate its 30th anniversary, some of his colleagues prepared a book of papers in his honour which was published shortly before his death in November 2022.

Bidwell was elected as a Fellow of the Society of Antiquaries of London in March 1985.

Bidwell died on 5 November 2022, at the age of 73.

== Select publications ==
- Bidwell, P. T. 1979. The Legionary Bath-house and Basilica and Forum at Exeter, Exeter Archaeological Reports Vol. 1, Exeter
- Bidwell, P. T. 1985. The Roman Fort of Vindolanda at Chesterholm, Northumberland, HBM England Archaeological Report no. 1, London.
- Bidwell, P. T. and Holbrook, N. 1989. Hadrian's Wall bridges, English Heritage Archaeological Reports no. 9, London.
- Bidwell, P. T. and Speak, S.C. 1994. Excavations at South Shields Roman Fort, vol. 1, Society of Antiquaries of Newcastle upon Tyne with Tyne and Wear Museums
- Bidwell, P. T., Snape, M. and Croom, A. 1999. Hardknott Roman Fort, Cumbria: including an account of the excavations by the late Dorothy Charlesworth, CWAAS Research series no. 9, Kendal.
