= Kindred: Neanderthal Life, Love, Death and Art =

2020 book by Rebecca Wragg Sykes

- Author: Rebecca Wragg Sykes
- Language: English
- Subject: Neanderthals
- Publisher: Bloomsbury Sigma
- Publication date: October 27, 2020
- Pages: 400
- ISBN: 978-1-4729-3749-0

Kindred: Neanderthal Life, Love, Death and Art is a 2020 book by Rebecca Wragg Sykes that examines Neanderthals. The book was reviewed in multiple publications.

== Awards and accolades ==
- 2021 Hessell-Tiltman Prize
- 2021 Current Archaeology Book of the Year Award
