= Marion Dowd =

Archaeologist

- Occupation: Archaeology
- Awards: 2016 Archaeology Awards for book of the year

Academic background
- Education: University College Cork
- Thesis: Caves: Sacred Places in the Irish Landscape (2004)

Academic work
- Institutions: Institute of Technology, Sligo
- Notable works: The Archaeology of Caves in Ireland

Marion Dowd is an archaeologist. She is best known for her book, The Archaeology of Caves in Ireland which won Book of the Year at the 2016 Archaeology Awards.

== Education and career ==
Dowd received her MA in 1997 and her PhD in 2004, both of which were from University College Cork. Her PhD thesis title was, Caves: Sacred Places in the Irish Landscape.

In 2016, Dowd, along with archaeologist, Dr Ruth Carden, analysed a butchered bear bone that had been discovered in a cave in County Clare, Ireland around 100 years before. Using radiocarbon dating, they established that the bone was 10,000 years old. This indicated that human occupation of Ireland began 2,000 years earlier than originally thought as previously, the oldest evidence of human habitation in Ireland was 8,000 years old.

Dowd's first book, The Archaeology of Caves in Ireland was published in 2015 is about how prehistoric people used and interacted with caves in Ireland. It won the 2015 Tratram Award and the 2016 Archaeology Award for Book of the Year. Her second book, The Archaeology of Darkness was co-edited with Robert Hensey and published in 2016 and focuses on how darkness was viewed in the past.

== Bibliography ==
- The Archaeology of Caves in Ireland (2015) ISBN 9781782978138
- The Archaeology of Darkness, co-edited by Robert Hensey, (2016) ISBN 9781785701917
