= Rebecca Jones (archaeologist) =

Head of Heritage Recording and Archaeology at Historic Environment Scotland

- Occupation: Archaeologist

Academic background
- Education: University of Glasgow
- Thesis: The temporary encampments of the Roman army in Scotland (2006)

Academic work
- Institutions: Historic Environment Scotland

Rebecca Jones was Head of Archaeology and World Heritage at Historic Environment Scotland. She then took a position as Director of Alumni Relations before being appointed Keeper of Scottish History and Archaeology at National Museums Scotland in 2024.

== Career ==
Jones studied for an undergraduate degree in Ancient History and Archaeology at the University of Newcastle. In 1999-2000 she worked at Aberystwyth University with Jeffrey Davies, which resulted in the publication of the volume Roman Camps in Wales and the Marches in 2006. Jones completed her PhD at the University of Glasgow in 2006 entitled "The temporary encampments of the Roman army in Scotland ", supervised by Bill Hanson. Prior to her role at Historic Environment Scotland, Jones worked for the Royal Commission on the Ancient and Historical Monuments of Scotland. Jones is co-Chair of the International Congress of Roman Frontier Studies. She published a major monograph entitled Roman Camps in Scotland in 2011. Her 2012 book Roman Camps in Britain won the Current Archaeology Book of the Year award 2013.

== Selected publications ==
- Davies, J., and Jones, R. 2006. Roman Camps in Wales and the Marches. University of Wales Press.
- Jones, R.H. 2011. Roman Camps in Scotland. Edinburgh: Society of Antiquaries of Scotland.
- Jones, R.H. 2012. Roman Camps in Britain. Stroud: Amberley Pub.
- Owen, K. and Jones, R. 2019 Presenting an Archaeology for Everyone: Changing our approach to publicly funded archaeological investigation in Scotland, Internet Archaeology 51. doi:10.11141/ia.51.3
