= Erich Swoboda =

- Born: 30 August 1896; Vienna
- Died: 22 November 1964 (aged 68); Graz

Erich Swoboda (30 August 1896, in Vienna – 22 November 1964, in Graz) was an Austrian historian and ancient Roman archaeologist. In 1946, he became an associate professor at the University of Graz and became the director of the Institute for the History of Antiquity and Antiquity in Vienna. From 1951 to 1953, he served as a dean, and from 1960 to 1961 was the rector of the university. He received the Austrian Decoration for Science and Art.

== Selected publications ==
- Swoboda, Erich (1935), Führer durch Aguntum (in German), R.M. Rohrer, OCLC 43260795
- Swoboda, Erich (1949), Carnuntum: Seine Geschichte u. seine Denkmäler (in German), Österreich. Archäolog. Inst, OCLC 163349262
- Swoboda, Erich (1963), Zur Frage der Romanisierung, Anzeiger der phil.-hist. Klasse der Österreichischen Akademie der Wissenschaften. (in German), Österreichische Akademie der Wissenscahften, OCLC 43259235
- Swoboda, Erich (1966), Corolla memoriae Erich Swoboda dedicata, Römische Forschungen in Niederösterreich, Bd. 5 (in German), Graz, OCLC 884609801
