= Alauna (Maryport) =

Roman fort and settlement on the site of present-day Maryport in Cumbria, England

- Cumbria, England
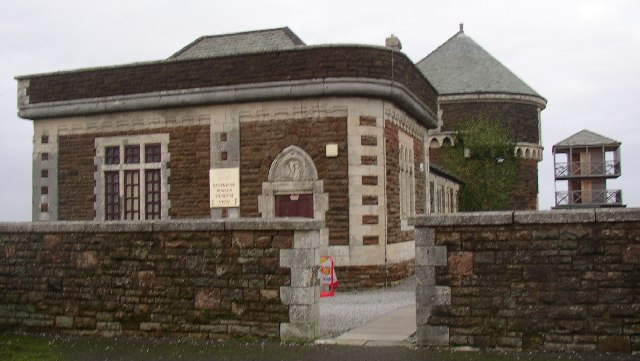
- Senhouse Roman Museum, with its replica Roman watch-tower in the background.

Location
- Location in Allerdale, Cumbria Location in Cumbria, England
- Coordinates: 54.720936°N 3.493978°W
- Grid reference: NY03863724

Alauna was a castrum or fort in the Roman province of Britannia. It occupied a coastal site just north of the town of Maryport in the English county of Cumbria (formerly part of Cumberland).

It was linked by a Roman road to the Roman fort and settlement at Derventio (Papcastle) to the southeast, and thence by another road northeast to the regional hub of Luguvalium (Carlisle).

In 2015 "Maryport's Mystery Monuments" was Research Project of the Year in the British Archaeology Awards.

== Name ==
It has been established "beyond reasonable doubt" that the Roman name for Maryport was Alauna. Alauna is a river name and the Roman fort stands on a hill north of the River Ellen. The name Alauna appears securely just once – in the Ravenna Cosmography. The Antonine Itinerary mentions a fort called Alone on the road from Ravenglass to Whitchurch but this cannot be Maryport, but is either a fort at Watercrook (on the river Kent near Kendal) or one at Low Borrowbridge (on the River Lune near Tebay). The Notitia Dignitatum lists a fort called Alione, garrisoned by the Cohors III Nerviorum, which has been equated with both Alauna and Alone by different scholars.

== Character ==
The fort was established during the reign of the emperor Hadrian around AD 122 as a command and supply base for the coastal defences of Hadrian's Wall at its western extremity. There are substantial remains of the Roman fort, which was one of a series along the Cumbrian coast intended to prevent Hadrian's Wall being outflanked by crossing the Solway Firth. Geo-magnetic surveys have revealed a large Roman town surrounding the fort. An archaeological dig discovered evidence of a second, earlier, larger fort next to, and partially under the present remains.

Recent excavations have shown that a nearby enclosure ditch related to a late Iron Age and Romano-British farmstead may even have supplied the fort with food, possibly in exchange for goods like pottery.

== Geophysical survey ==
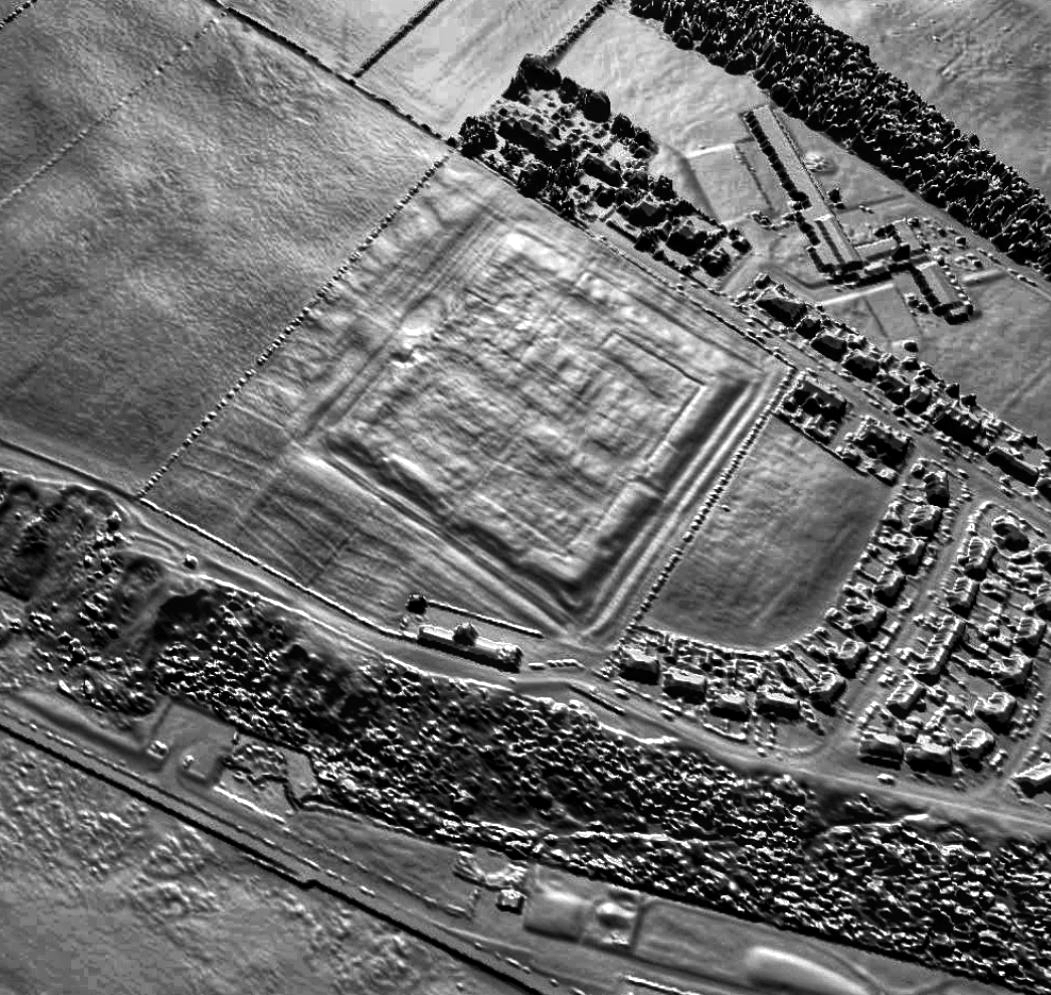
A lidar view of Alauna Roman fort and vicus

TimeScape Surveys (Biggins & Taylor), supported by a grant from the Maryport Heritage Trust, conducted a magnetometry geophysical survey of the fort and its vicus (civilian settlement). Some targeted areas of resistivity survey were completed. The survey was conducted between May 2000 and September 2003 on land at Camp Farm, Maryport. Covering 72.5 hectares (170 acres), it is the largest geophysical survey carried out on the northern Roman frontier. The survey revealed multi-period activity, together with the possible location of a Roman port or causeway. The fort had been robbed of stone to construct other buildings in the locality. The vicus was well-preserved and had a substantial road leading to the suspected Roman entrepôt. The field system surrounding the vicus was extensive and showed small 'market garden' plots, some containing buildings. The survey also detected a suspected Iron Age enclosure and elements of medieval buildings.

== Museum and artefacts ==
The Roman fort site was owned from the 16th century by generations of the Senhouse family. The main building on the site was constructed as a naval artillery drill hall in 1885; it was converted into a museum (the Senhouse Roman Museum) in 1990. The Senhouse family's collections are now housed in the museum. The numerous Roman artefacts include altars. The site has yielded more altars than any other in Britain, and the finds have been made over a long period of time, from Tudor times to the present century.

=== Altars ===
The altars are made of local sandstone. They were erected for ceremonies which appear to have taken place annually. The inscriptions give information about the fort and its inhabitants. One of the best known, now in the British Museum, has an inscription dedicated by Gaius Cornelius Peregrinus, a decurion (town councillor) from Saldae (present-day Bejaia in Algeria), who was tribunus (military commander) of the auxiliary garrison.

Excavations beginning in 2011 have thrown more light on the altars. The archaeologists included Ian Haynes of Newcastle University and Tony Wilmott (who won the Archaeologist of the Year award in 2012).

Where the altars originally stood is not known, but they were designed to stand in rows. They were possibly aligned in relation to a temple, and excavations have examined evidence for two temples.

The 2011 excavation season revisited a site where 17 altars were found in pits in 1870. The circumstances of the altars' deposition have been reinterpreted and it is accepted that they were re-used in the foundations of a late-Roman building. This suggests that religious beliefs at Alauna changed during the period of Roman occupation.

== See also ==
- Alavana or Alauna, the Roman fort at Watercrook near Kendal
