= Military History Matters =

British military history magazine

- Editor: Laurence Earle
- Former editors: Neil Faulkner
- Categories: Military history
- Frequency: Bi-monthly
- First issue: October 2010
- Company: Current Publishing
- Country: United Kingdom
- Based in: London
- Language: English
- Website: military-history.org
- ISSN: 2631-990X

Military History Matters is a bi-monthly military history magazine, published by Current Publishing.

The magazine was established in October 2010 as Military Times and became Military History Monthly in November 2011. It obtained its current title in January 2019.

== Overview ==
The first issue of Military History Matters was published in October 2010 to coincide with the 70th anniversary of the Battle of Britain. The magazine was originally edited by Neil Faulkner, the current editor as of 2024 is Laurence Earle. It covers all aspects of military history, from battles of the ancient world, up to more recent conflicts in Iraq and Afghanistan.

In celebration of its 50th issue in November 2014, and to commemorate the centenary of World War I, Military History Monthly and the Royal United Services Institute brought together four military history experts for "The Great War Debate". The speakers included politician and author Patrick Mercer.
