= Elisabeth Ettlinger =

Swiss archaeologist (1915–2012)

- Born: 14 July 1915
- Died: 21 March 2012 (aged 96)

Academic background
- Education: University of Basel
- Thesis: Die Keramik aus den Frauenthermen von Augst (1942)

Academic work
- Discipline: Archaeology; Architecture
- Institutions: University of Bern

Elisabeth Ettlinger, FSA (née Lachmann; 14 July 1915 – 21 March 2012) was a German-born archaeologist and academic, who specialised in archaeology of the Roman provinces and Roman Switzerland.

== Career ==
Ettlinger completed her doctorate in 1942 at the University of Basel, having immigrated to Switzerland in the 1930s to escape Nazi Germany: her thesis was published in 1949 as Die Keramik der Augster Thermen (Insula XVII). Ausgrabung 1937-38. From September 1963 to June 1964, she was a member of the Institute for Advanced Study in Princeton, New Jersey. From 1964 to 1980, Ettlinger taught at the University of Bern. Her research centred on Roman ceramics such as Terra Sigillata, and she co-founded Rei Cretariae Romanae Fautores, a learned society dedicated to Roman pottery: she was its secretary, vice-president and then served as its president from 1971 to 1980. In 1972 she published Die römischen Fibeln in der Schweiz, which "still acts as an essential reference book for the study of Roman brooches." Ettlinger also worked prolifically on Vindonissa, the site of a Roman military camp, and served as president of the Gesellschaft Pro Vindonissa. Her archives are held at the University of Basel.

== Honours ==
Ettlinger was elected to the German Archaeological Institute in 1968, and as a corresponding member of the Austrian Archaeological Institute in 1975. On 27 November 1975, she was elected a Fellow of the Society of Antiquaries of London (FSA).

== Personal life ==
Ettlinger was born in 1915 in Breslau into a Jewish academic family: her parents were Richard Lachmann (geologist) (1885–1916) and Hedwig Hopf (1893–1953); her maternal uncle was the mathematician Heinz Hopf (1894–1971). After her father's death, she and her mother moved to Berlin, and then in 1935 to Switzerland to escape Nazi Germany. In 1940, she married the Swiss microbiologist Leopold Ettlinger (microbiologist), with whom she had two sons.

== Selected works ==
- Ettlinger, Elisabeth (1951). Legionary Pottery from Vindonissa. The Journal of Roman Studies, 41, 105–111. https://doi.org/10.2307/298103
- Ettlinger, E., & Fellmann, R. (1955). Ein Sigillata-Depotfund aus dem Legionslager Vindonissa. Germania: Anzeiger der Römisch-Germanischen Kommission des Deutschen Archäologischen Instituts, 33(4), 364-373.
- Ettlinger, Elisabeth (1972). Die römischen Fibeln in der Schweiz. Bern: Francke
- Ettlinger, Elisabeth (1977). Aspects of amphora-typology,-seen from the North. Publications de l'École Française de Rome, 32(1), 9-16.
- Ettlinger, Elisabeth (1979). Helvetische Reliefsigillaten und die Rolle der Werkstatt Bern-Enge (in German). Bern: Stämpfli. ISBN 3-7272-0512-1.
- Ettlinger, Elisabeth (1983). Die Italische Sigillata von Novaesium (in German). Bonn: Rheinisches Landesmuseum. ISBN 3-7861-1369-6.
- Ettlinger, Elisabeth (1990). "Conspectus formarum terrae sigillatae Italico modo confectae". Journal of Roman Archaeology (in German). 6. Bonn: R. Habelt: 411–414. doi:10.1017/S1047759400011776. S2CID 250350622.
