= Bubon sculpture of Septimius Severus =

Decapitated bronze statue of Roman emperor

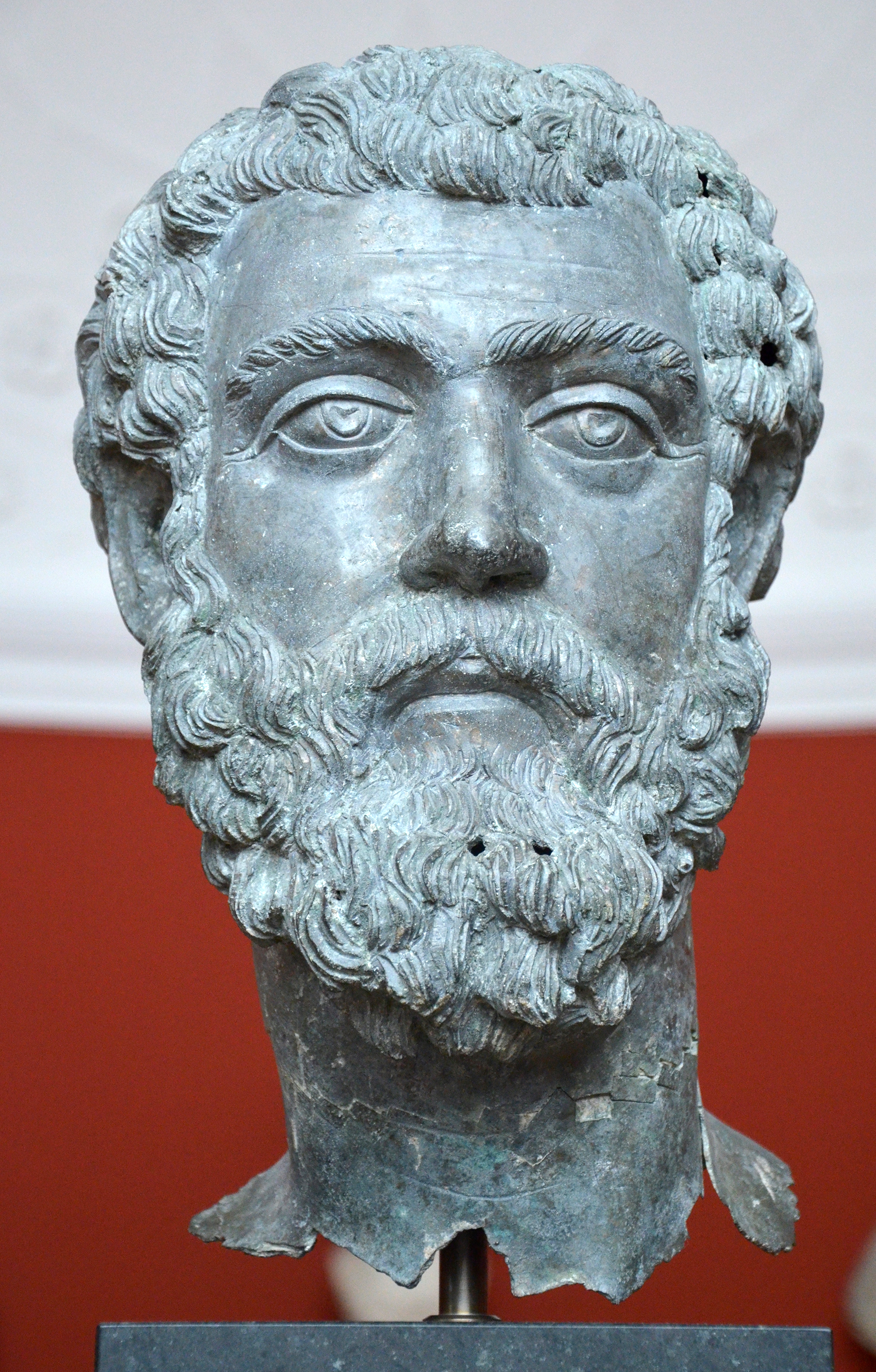
It is unclear exactly when the head of the bronze Septimius Severus statue was separated from its body

A bronze sculpture of the Roman emperor Septimius Severus, dated to 225 C.E., was part of a group of bronzes within a shrine to an imperial cult in Bubon, Turkey.

Dated to 225 C.E., the statue was buried due to earthquakes and decapitated at an unknown point in time. In the 1960s it was looted by local farmers and sold abroad, with both its head and body ending up with antiquities dealer Robert Hecht; the head was later purchased at an art market and exhibited in the Ny Carlsberg Glyptotek in Copenhagen from 1970, whereas its body was lent to the Metropolitan Museum of Art in New York City from 2011. After an investigation into its looting, the body was seized and returned to Turkey in 2023 and the Glyptotek returned the head to Turkey the next year.

== History ==
=== Time at Bubon, burial and decapitation ===
The bronze statue was part of a group of bronzes from a shrine to the imperial cult in Bubon, a distant part of the Roman Empire and now an archaeological site in southwest Turkey. This shrine was first started around 50 A.D. and likely used for around two centuries before being buried during earthquakes. It is thought that the statue of Roman emperor Septimius Severus, which dates to 225 C.E., stood next to other statues of his wife and children at the shrine. This included a statue of his eldest son Caracalla which was made between 211 and 217 C.E.

For just under 2,000 years, The statues at Bubon were largely buried as a result of the centuries of earthquakes and other landscape changes. In antiquity, most bronze statues were melted down, however the bronzes in Bubon were buried and thus survived this. It is unclear whether it lost its head over these millennia, or during its later excavation.

=== Excavation, separation and exhibition ===
During the 1960s, many of the statues at Bubon were looted by local farmers and sold; they were not reported to the Turkish government as was required by a law from 1906 as well as other statutes. Farmers made use of tractors to dig at the site. Many of these items, including the headless Severus statue, were smuggled into Switzerland and passed through the hands of antiquities dealer Robert Hecht, who was based in New York at the time.

The statue's head was acquired by the Ny Carlsberg Glyptotek in Copenhagen in 1970 on the art market for 365,500 Swiss francs ($85,000 USD), also from Hecht. Following this, one of the experts at the Glyptotek, Flemming Johansen, visited the statue's body which was at the time at a show on loan at the Indianapolis Museum of Art, suspecting that the head and body were two parts of the same statue. A 1975 spectral analysis of samples from both the head and torso found "nothing to contradict the hypothesis that the head and the body originally belonged to the same statue". In 1979, the body and head were first reunited, being displayed together in Denmark. Turkish archaeologist Jale İnan saw this display and similarly concluded that they matched, later writing in a 1993 paper about their origin in Bubon and publishing an image of the two together in 1994.

In 2011, the body was lent to the Metropolitan Museum of Art, which placed the headless statue in its Roman Court in 2011, identifying it as a "Statue of a Male Nude Figure" and including a label alongside it which stated that there was reason to question the validity of it depicting the emperor. While the Met consistently maintained that the statue's body was that of Septimius Severus, over time, researchers and the district attorney’s office identified it as a statue of him. It lived in the Greek and Roman galleries at the museum for 12 years, on loan from a Swiss lender.

=== Return of head and body to Turkey ===
An inquiry into Hecht's past dealings began after Hecht's death in 2012, leading investigators to obtain information about the Turkish objects he dealt with. In February 2023, the body was seized from the museum by investigators, who said it had been stolen from Bubon in the 1960s. It was one of three items from the museum and one of 12 in the US that totalled to $33 million, that were to be returned to Turkey. The headless statue itself was valued at $25 million alone. The owner who had lent it to the Met did not fight the return. Two of the looters, who were in their 70s, visited the statue.

Following the return of the headless body of the statue to Turkey in 2023, the Turkish government began to petition the Glyptotek to request the return of the head so it could be reunited with the body in Turkey. Despite this, the Glyptotek's head of collections Rune Fredericksen said that the museum had begun to doubt the connection between the head and body in recent years; he said that the museum had not "found any compelling evidence in this direction, which has also been the opinion by most scholars in the area since decades," and called positive evidence for this link "circumstantial and weak." In summer 2024, the Glyptotek launched an official investigation into the piece; experts confirmed that it had likely been looted and officials announced the decision to return it to Turkey in December, finding "exceptionally strong arguments and scientific documentation" which allowed them to separate the work from the museum's collection. Turkish ambassador to Denmark Hakan Tekin said the museum "ha[d] done the right thing."
