= Minerva (archaeology magazine) =

Archaeology magazine (1990–2023)

Minerva: Archaeology & Ancient Art
- Editor: Maria Earle
- Categories: Ancient art, archaeology
- Frequency: Bi-monthly
- Publisher: Current Publishing
- Founded: 1990
- Company: Current Publishing
- Country: United Kingdom
- Website: minervamagazine.com
- ISSN: 0957-7718
- OCLC: 21732204

Minerva, Archaeology and Ancient Art, was a bi-monthly magazine publishing features on exhibitions, excavations, and museums, interviews, news items, and book reviews. It ran from 1990 to 2023.

== History and profile ==
Minerva was established in 1990 containing articles by experts on the ancient art and archaeology of Egypt and the Middle East, the Graeco-Roman world and the Mediterranean, the Near East, the Far East, Scandinavia, and North and South America.

In 2009 Minerva was purchased by the Mougins Museum of Classical Art, and its subject matter was expanded to include art and the arts influenced and inspired by the ancient world, including architecture, opera, music, film and literature.

Jerome M. Eisenberg served as the magazine's editor from its founding in 1990 until 2009.

In 2020 the magazine was purchased by Current Publishing.

Minerva July/August 2023 was the last issue of the journal, after which publication ceased.
