= Ancient Egypt (magazine) =

British magazine

Ancient Egypt Magazine
- Editor: Peter Phillips
- Categories: Archaeology, Egyptology
- Frequency: Bi-monthly
- First issue: 2000
- Company: Current Publishing
- Country: United Kingdom
- Based in: Manchester
- Language: English
- Website: www.ancientegyptmagazine.com
- ISSN: 1470-9996

Ancient Egypt is a magazine that deals with the subject of Egyptology. It is published bi-monthly. Ancient Egypt magazine is pitched somewhere between an academic journal and a travel magazine – bringing the spectacular sights of the ancient world together with the latest archaeological discoveries and theories from the world's leading authorities on the subject, illustrated with numerous photographs.

The magazine has been published bi-monthly in the UK since April 2000. The contents concentrate mainly on a wide range of subjects related to ancient Egypt, though it does occasionally include items on Coptic or Islamic Egypt and also items of interest to visitors to Egypt. Edited by Peter Phillips, Ancient Egypt seeks to explain the mysteries of this ancient civilisation in a concise manner. One of the former editors was Robert Bernard Partridge who served in the post from 2004 to 2011.

The magazine does not just deal with the past, but has a correspondent in Cairo who provides updates on the latest travel information and assesses the impact Egyptology has on modern Egypt.
