= Current World Archaeology =

British magazine

- Editors: Andrew Selkirk (Editor-in-Chief); Matthew Symonds (Editor)
- Categories: Archaeology
- Frequency: Bi-monthly
- Founded: 2003
- Company: Current Publishing
- Country: United Kingdom
- Language: English
- Website: www.world-archaeology.com
- ISSN: 1745-5820

Current World Archaeology is a magazine devoted to archaeology spanning the globe.

== Summary ==
The magazine focuses particularly on Egypt, Mesopotamia and the Near East, and Greece and Rome, while the civilizations of the Americas are frequently covered. It studies great civilisations from significant eras of the past, such as Early Humans; the Egyptians; the Greek Empire; Jōmon; Mayans; The Roman Empire; and Alexander the Great. The 100th issue, published in April 2020, covered an Ice Age sculpture, the Vergina tombs of Alexander the Great’s family, Ephesus revisited, Angkor Wat and the Tikal pyramids. Other main features in past issues have included articles on Herculaneum.

As a magazine and not an academic journal, the publication is aimed at amateurs as well as professional archaeologists. It is 'essentially a "news" magazine' which looks for new discoveries when they occur, and reports on recent excavations. The producers work in collaboration with the British Museum, the British Academy, and many universities, both in the UK and across the world. It is recommended by the Council for British Archaeology.

The publication includes articles written by established academics, such as Simon Kamer, Assistant Director of the Sainsbury Institute for the Study of Japanese Arts and Cultures, Professor Andrew Reynolds (University College London) and David Gilman Romano (University of Pennsylvania).

The magazine is published 6 times per year and was launched in September 2003 as a sister magazine to Current Archaeology. It is published in the United Kingdom by Current Publishing and Andrew Selkirk is the editor-in-chief, and has a circulation of 5,000 subscribers in the UK and 20,000 across the world.

== Features ==
Each issue includes at least 4 major features, covering topics from all areas of archaeology around the world. These are often written by archaeologists, and edited to make them accessible to all. The magazine also includes news, reviews, and columns, including regular columns by Brian M. Fagan (University of California) and Richard Hodges, and occasional competitions.
