= Current Archaeology =

British magazine about archaeology

- Editors: Andrew Selkirk (Editor-in-Chief); Carly Hilts (Editor)
- Categories: Archaeology
- Frequency: Monthly
- First issue: 1967
- Company: Current Publishing
- Country: United Kingdom
- Based in: London
- Language: English
- Website: archaeology.co.uk
- ISSN: 0011-3212

Current Archaeology is a British monthly archaeology magazine.

== Summary ==
Current Archaeology describes itself as the "United Kingdom's best selling archaeology magazine", a claim substantiated by British Archaeological Jobs and Resources online, which labels the title "Britain's favourite archaeology magazine". It was founded in 1967 by Andrew Selkirk, a Fellow of the Society of Antiquaries, and the present editor-in-chief. Issue 1 was mailed free of charge to university academics and archaeologists, with invitations to become subscribers from Issue 2. The magazine now has more than 14,000 subscribers worldwide. From 1967 to 2007 the magazine was bi-monthly, becoming monthly in November 2007. Rob Selkirk is publisher of the magazine, through Current Publishing.

The magazine covers all periods of British archaeology, from prehistory to the present day. It also publishes an annual Archaeology Handbook, which aims to be the quickest way to find out about archaeology in Britain, covering digs, societies, professional organisations, education, and more. The magazine is designed to cater for a wide spectrum of enthusiasts from amateur archaeologists to academics and practising professionals. The magazine is particularly popular amongst students and scholars. In December 2010, The Heritage Journal noted that "All-in-all Current Archaeology is eminently readable".

== Regular features and contents ==
According to The Heritage Journal, "Each issue usually focusses on just 3 or 4 main articles as well as the usual editorial and news/reviews sections that you’d expect. The main articles usually provide in depth information about a recent dig or geographic theme – recent editions have included articles on ‘UnRoman Britain’ and ‘British Hoards’... Each issue also has a one-page article titled ‘Odd Socs’, each issue covering one of the more ‘minority interest’ organisations. The back cover usually contains a GB map with pins to denote the geographical areas covered within the issue."

A sister magazine, Current World Archaeology, launched in September 2003, deals with archaeology outside Britain.

== Current Archaeology Live ==
"Current Archaeology Live" is an annual conference, summarising the year's significant events, finds and developments in the world of archaeology. The conference features lectures on previous and upcoming stories reported by Current Archaeology by noted academics and contributors. Past speakers include Oxford graduate Terry Jones, of Monty Python fame, who spoke at the 2010 conference on "Romans and Barbarians".

== Awards ==
In 2009, Current Archaeology founded the Archaeology Awards, an annual ceremony to celebrate noted archaeologists and events, with winners voted for entirely by the public. Categories include Archaeologist of the Year; Research Project of the Year; Rescue Dig of the Year; and Book of the Year.
