= Department of Archaeology, University of Sheffield =

Academic department in UK university

Department of Archaeology
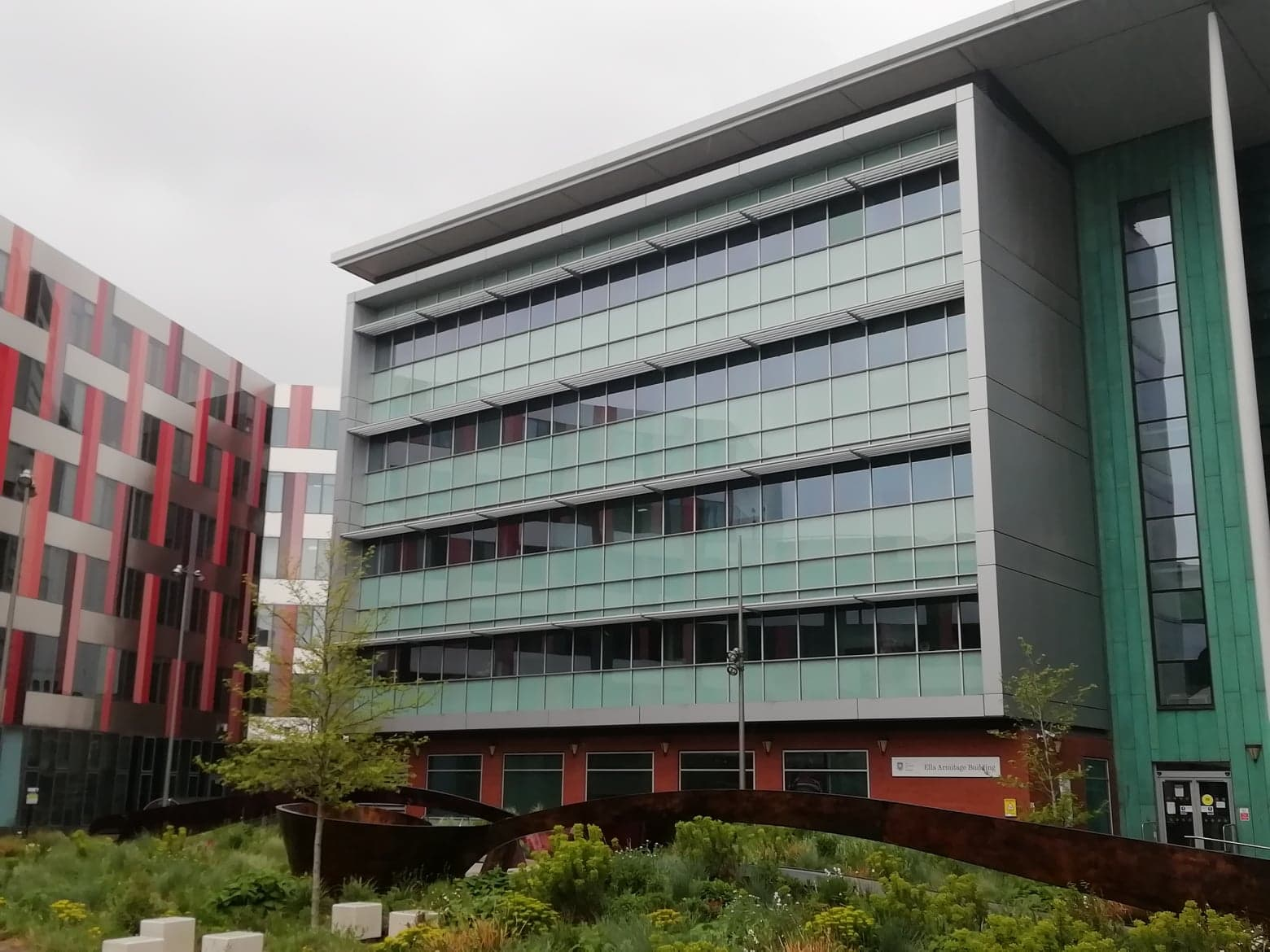
- Type: Academic department
- Active: 1976–2025
- Affiliations: University of Sheffield
- Head of Department: None
- Location: Sheffield, South Yorkshire, England; 53.3804°N 1.4806°W
- Website: www.sheffield.ac.uk/archaeology

The Department of Archaeology at the University of Sheffield, UK, was an academic department dedicated to archaeology from 1976 to January 2025, based in the city of Sheffield, South Yorkshire. The department was founded in 1976, stemming from early archaeology programs in the 1960s. As of 2026, archaeological research and postgraduate courses in archaeology at Sheffield are located in the school of history, philosophy and digital humanities and the school of biosciences.

The department's past research specialisms included Prehistoric Europe, Classical Antiquity, Medieval Archaeology and Post-Medieval Britain, as well as landscape archaeology, funerary archaeology, material culture studies, zooarchaeology, osteology, bioarchaeology, and the archaeology of the Mediterranean. From its inception in the 1960s, Sheffield developed a worldwide reputation for leading the science-based revolution in archaeology and theoretical turns in archaeological interpretation.

The department was under threat of closure or merging into other departments from May 2021, with closure planned at the end of the 2023/24 academic year. The University's Executive Board followed up on this decision in January 2025.

== History ==
=== Origins ===
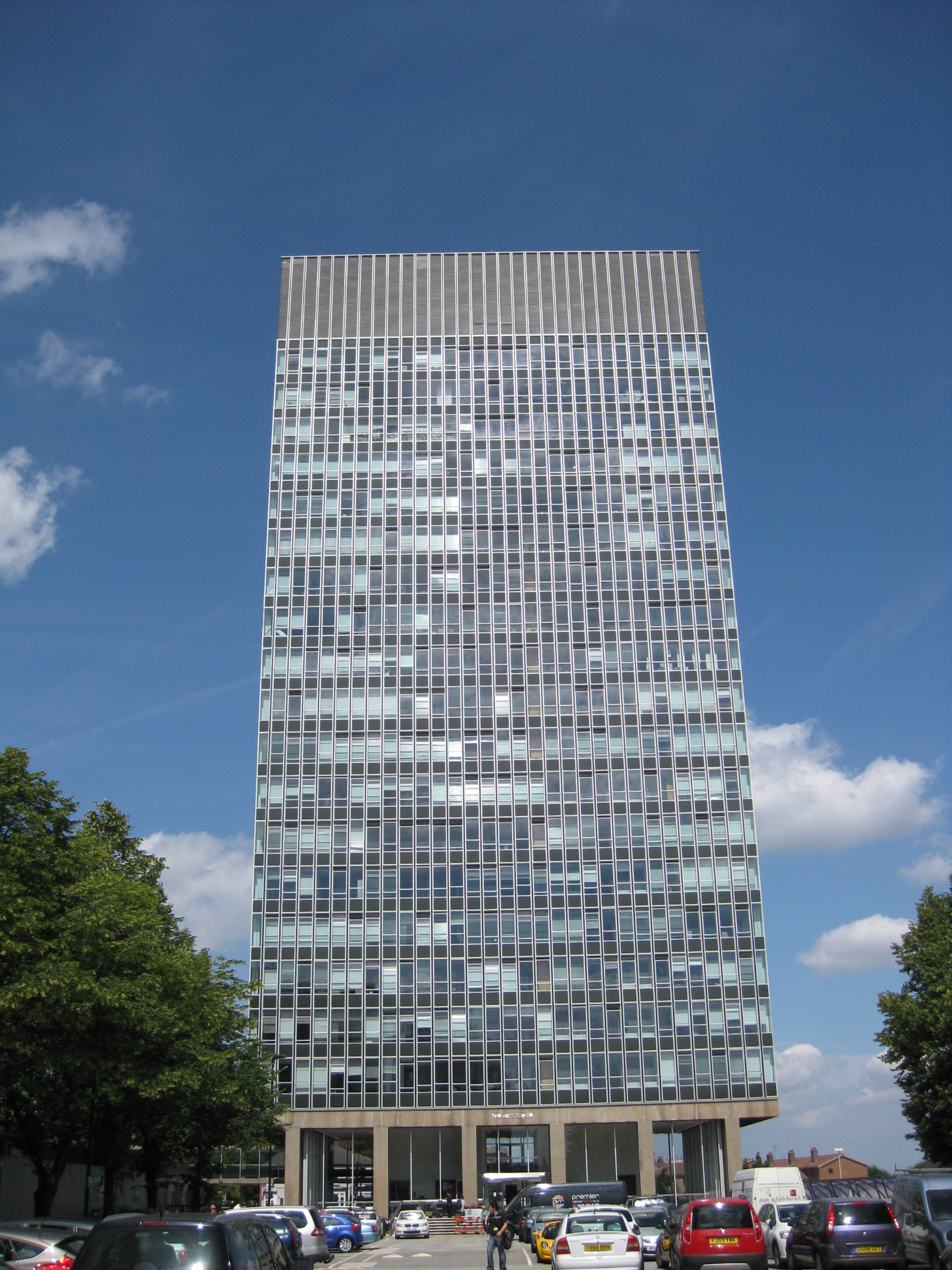
The Arts Tower in Sheffield, the original home of the Department of Prehistory and Archaeology.

Research and study of archaeology at Sheffield developed over several decades. The first degree given for an archaeological subject at the University of Sheffield was to Percy Heathcote in 1930 as an MA for studying the burial mounds and stone circles on Stanton Moor and creating a small dedicated museum for the finds in Birchover. In 1931 Arthur Woodward who had been Director of the British School at Athens was appointed to a lectureship in the Department of Ancient History at Sheffield. Woodward had excavated at Sparta and at Roman sites in Yorkshire including forts at Slack and Ilkley, and the Roman villa at Rudston. The appointment of Robert Hopper, a specialist on Greek coinage and the Acropolis, to the Department of Ancient History introduced the first explicit archaeological elements to the University's programs and establishment of the Department on the 7th Floor of the Arts Tower. Hopper decided to concentrate on prehistory and appointed Warwick Bray in 1963 and Colin Renfrew in 1965 as lecturers to prepare the archaeology courses and set up a Single Honours degree in Prehistory and Archaeology with the first eight students graduating in 1970. The course concentrated on theory and scientific methods in the context of British and European Prehistory.

From the foundation in the 1960s, the Department and its programs were expanded and built upon. In 1967, the appointment of Jane Renfrew and Andrew Flemming as lecturers marked the first increase in dedicated research. Paul Mellars and Patricia Phillips were appointed as research fellows in 1965 and 1970 respectively, and promoted lectureships in 1970 and 1972. In conjunction with the further appointments of John Collis and Graeme Barker in 1972, and Robin Dennell in 1973 the research portfolio of the Department had broadened to include specialisms in theory, excavation, field survey, economics, and environmental archaeology.

=== Foundation, 1976 ===
With the expansion of the department, Prehistory and Ancient History split into two separate departments when Robert Hopper retired in 1975. Keith Branigan was appointed in 1976, founding the Department of Prehistory and Archaeology officially in September 1976, and introducing the teaching and research of Aegean Prehistory and Archaeology and Roman Archaeology. The Department at Sheffield then expanded further by introducing elements of Industrial Archaeology taught by David Crossley from the Sheffield Department of Economic and Social History, and appointing Richard Hodges to teach Medieval Archaeology. The appointment of Robin Torrence to teach anthropology, theory, and statistics (who had studied under Lewis Binford and Colin Refrew) in line with the department's expansion marked an increasing diversification and seminal interdisciplinary perspective on archaeological research.

Further growth in 1976 due to the creation of the SERC Science-based Archaeology Committee through the UK Research Councils allowed for Sheffield to capitalise on an interdisciplinary approach to archaeology. By 1977, the department had ten staff and was one of the largest archaeology departments in Britain. Dave Gilbertson joined the department as a physical geographer during this period to teach Environmental Archaeology and initiated the move of the department to its dedicated laboratory building at 3 Clarkehouse Road, opened by Magnus Magnusson in 1979.

Sheffield became a major centre in changing archaeological practice. The expansion of radiocarbon dating and dendrochronology research in the 1970s at Sheffield, with Colin Refrew widening the application of radiocarbon dating in researching the origins of copper metallurgy and megalithic tombs in Europe, and the establishment of the Sheffield dendrochronology laboratory led by Ruth Morgan, Jennifer Hillam and Cathy Groves marked seminal changes in chronological dating techniques and methods. New theoretical discussions on cultural change also prompted Renfrew (now at Southampton) and Andrew Flemming to organise a joint archaeological theory seminar in 1975, which became the annual Theoretical Archaeology Group meetings from 1979.

=== Expansion, 1980s-2000s ===
The 1980s saw further widening of the department's specialisms in undergraduate and postgraduate teaching, specifically by hiring former pilot Derrick Riley to teach aerial photography, and Judson Chesterman the leading surgeon in Sheffield to demonstrate osteology. The Department of Ancient History had continued after the split with Prehistory had appointed several classical archaeologists that also taught and researched in conjunction with the Department of Prehistory and Archaeology: John Cherry, Ian Sanders, David Kennedy, and John Lloyd all joined and led major archaeological projects. National cuts to universities in the UK through the 1980s however meant the closure of the Department of Ancient History in 1988 with some staff deciding to leave Sheffield and others merging into the Department of Prehistory and Archaeology. In the 1980s, the Department changed its name to the Department of Archaeology and Prehistory, marking a change to its research emphasis. This change ushered in a strengthening of materials research in the Department of Archaeology and Prehistory during the 1990s with the appointment of Barbara Ottaway to teach metallurgy and later Caroline Jackson in glass. Further appointments through the 1980s and 1990s increased the specialities of the Department: Glynis Jones (palaeobotany), Paul Halstead (zooarchaeology), Mark Edmonds (landscape and Neolithic archaeology), John Moreland (medieval archaeology), Mike Parker Pearson (prehistoric archaeology), Marek Zvelebil (prehistory and agriculture), Maureen Carroll (Roman archaeology), and Andrew Chamberlain (human osteology), Kevin Edwards (palaeoenvironments), and John Barrett (archaeological theory and British Bronze Age) expanded the range of specialisms in the department.

The 1980s and 1990s also saw the inception of major archaeological projects; SEARCH (Sheffield Environmental and Archaeological Research Campaign in the Hebrides) which began in 1987 and lasting until 2003, and the Stonehenge Riverside Project were significant UK archaeology projects within this group. Postgraduates at the department founded Assemblage, an online peer-reviewed journal for graduate students to share their work, in 1994 with the first issue published in 1996. Over time, the journal began to include articles from more established researchers and was one of the first online-only archaeology journals. The 1990s also saw the expansion of the department to include commercial archaeological projects through the establishment of ARCUS (Archaeological Research and Consultancy at the University of Sheffield). During this period, several research centres and groups were established that went on to grow into significant international institutions. In 1995, the Sheffield Centre for Aegean Archaeology (SCAA) was established by (now Professor) Keith Branigan which was further enhanced in 2004 by the appointment of John Bennet to Sheffield's first Chair in Aegean Archaeology. The Centre capitalised on the expanding material analysis and material culture studies research areas to develop petrographic analyses of Mediterranean ceramics, including the appointment of Peter Day to a lectureship in 1994. The Sheffield Centre for Archaeobotany and ancient Land-usE (SCALE) was also established during this period by researchers including Glynis Jones.

The early 2000s saw another change in name to the Department of Archaeology, reflecting prominent changes in how archaeology was being taught, researched and practised, especially in scientific methods and field survey. This included involvement in major UK infrastructure projects, such as John Barrett's work in Framework Archaeology during the expansion of Stanstead Airport and construction of Heathrow Terminal 5. The department had also moved premises to Northgate House on West Street to house the expanding laboratories and collections. Sub-disciplines were further built-upon with the appointment of Umberto Albarella in 2004 to grow the dedicated zooarchaeology lab and Hugh Willmott to expand European Medieval archaeology research. In 2005, Sue Sherratt and Andrew Sherratt took positions at Sheffield; Sue Sherratt held a permanent lectureship in East Mediterranean Archaeology and Andrew Sherratt was appointed to the Chair in Old World Prehistory where he remained until his death in 2006.

=== 2010-2021 ===
Following the 2008 financial crisis and the Great Recession, the department merged its commercial archaeology unit (ARCUS) with Wessex Archaeology to become the Wessex Archaeology northern branch in 2010.

Major projects throughout the 2010s continued to develop the department's profile and international collaborations, in traditional archaeological research, development of new methodologies, and an increasing portfolio of commercial and community archaeology involvement, such as in the creation of Barnsley's first museum and archive. From 2011-2016, Hugh Willmott led excavations at Thornton Abbey in North Lincolnshire, during which the project uncovered the first instance in Britain of a Black Death mass grave found in a rural, rather than urban, area. Through the Marie Sklodowska Curie Actions 7th Framework Program, Ellery Frahm's research in the New Archaeological Research Network for Integrating Approaches to Ancient Material Studies-NARNIA (fronted by Vasiliki Kassianidou at the University of Cyprus) expanded the application of portable x-ray fluorescence (pXRF) to source and survey obsidian in Armenia. In 2017, building on the newly-housed zooarchaeological reference collection, Umberto Albarella and Lenny Salvagno pioneered new zooarchaeological identification methods for sheep and goat. In 2018, the department discovered the remains of the Lodge Moor Prisoner of War Camp, largest prisoner of war camp in Britain in the Second World War.

In 2017, the department moved to new bespoke laboratories in the recently closed Sheffield Bioincubator (and renamed Ella Armitage Building after the archaeologist).

=== Closure ===
On 21 May 2021, it was announced that the University of Sheffield was considering closing the department, to stop teaching archaeology, and making all the department's staff redundant. The two other options considered were to further invest in the department, or to close the department but keep some teaching and research in archaeology within other departments of the university. On 26 May, it was announced that the university's preferred way forwards was to close the department but merge some of its staff into other departments. One of the department's lecturers, Hugh Willmott, stated that this would involve moving "only two small elements of our teaching into dispersed departments where they shall surely wither and quickly die".

The threat of closure has received criticism. A statement from the Council for British Archaeology described the proposed closure as "devastating" and went on to say that "at a time when commercial archaeology is desperate for new employees the loss of a department with Sheffield's reputation and track record is a short-sighted and retrograde step". A former department academic, Mike Parker Pearson, stated: "Sheffield is one of the UK's leading departments of archaeology, known and respected throughout the world. I suspect the vice-chancellor has no idea of the international outrage that closing the department is going to cause." A letter to The Times beginning "We are dismayed at the news that the University of Sheffield's renowned Department of Archaeology is under threat of closure" was signed by leading British archaeologists, including Amy Bogaard, Graeme Barker, Chris Gosden, Melanie Giles, Richard Hodges, and Colin Renfrew. An anonymous donor offered the university £200,000 if the department was kept open. The University Senate met on 23 June; a final decision was made on 12 July to close the department. By this point a petition to keep the department has gained more than 42,000 signatures. The University and College Union subsequently "[entered] into dispute with University management".

In December 2021, it was announced that the department would close at the end of the 2023/24 academic year. Remaining permanent academics would then move to either the history or biological sciences departments.

== Select projects and excavations ==
Years	Project	Site	Faculty involved	External collaborators
1968-1970	Sitagori excavations	Sitagroi, Greece	Colin Renfrew	
1973-19xx	Dartmoor Bronze Age reaves excavations	Dartmoor, UK	Andrew Flemming, John Collis	
1978	Aerial Photographic Archive for Archaeology in the Middle East (APAAME)	Middle East	David Kennedy	
1980–1990	Roystone Grange Archaeological Trail	Roystone Grange, UK	Richard Hodges	
	Survey of Molise and Excavation of the Monastery at San Vincenzo al Volturno	Molise, Italy	Graeme Barker, Richard Hodges	
	Late Iron Age urbanisation in the Auvergne	Auvergne-Rhône-Alpes, France	John Collis	
1980–1989	Montarrenti Archaeological Project	Montarrenti, Italy	Richard Hodges, Graeme Barker	
1987–2003	SEARCH (Sheffield Environmental and Archaeological Research Campaign in the Hebrides)	The Hebridies, UK South Uist, UK	Keith Branigan, Paul Mellars, Mike Parker Pearson, Marek Zvelebil	
1988-1999	Early hominids in Pakistan	Pakistan	Robin Dennell	British Archaeological Mission to Pakistan
1990-xxxx	Ancient Landscape Reconstruction in Bohemia (ALRB)	Czech Republic	Marek Zvelebil	
1999–2009	The Stansted Framework Project and Heathrow Terminal 5 Excavations	Heathrow Terminal 5, UK Stansted Airport, UK	John Barrett	Oxford Archaeology, Wessex Archaeology,
2003–2009	Stonehenge Riverside Project	Stonehenge and Avebury, UK	Mike Parker-Pearson	
2000-2019	Vagnari Roman Imperial Estate Excavations	Vagnari, Italy	Maureen Carroll	McCaster University
2000–2019	ArchAtlas	-	Andrew Sherratt, Susan Sherratt, Deborah Harlan	
2011-2016	Thornton Abbey Project	Thornton Abbey, UK	Hugh Willmott	
2018-	Lodge Moor Prisoner of War Camp	Redmires, UK		Sheffield Lakeland Landscape Partnership (SLLP)

== Notable alumni ==
- Amy Bogaard – Professor of Neolithic and Bronze Age Archaeology, University of Oxford
- Melanie Giles – Senior Lecturer in Archaeology, University of Manchester
- Chris Gosden – Professor of European Archaeology and Director of the Institute of Archaeology, University of Oxford
- Susan Greaney – Senior Properties Historian, English Heritage
- Yannis Hamilakis – Joukowsky Family Professor of Archaeology and Professor of Modern Greek Studies, Brown University
- Mike Heyworth – Director, Council for British Archaeology (2004–2020)
- Alexzandra Hildred – Head of Research, Mary Rose Trust
- Timothy Insoll – Al-Qasimi Professor of African and Islamic Archaeology, University of Exeter
- Judith Winters – Editor of Internet Archaeology
- Steven Mithen – Professor of Archaeology, University of Reading
- Carol Palmer – Director, British Institute in Amman
- Derek Pitman – Lecturer in Archaeology, Bournemouth University and host of Career in Ruins
- Nicholas J. Saunders – Emeritus Professor of Material Culture, University of Bristol
- Julian Thomas – Professor of Archaeology, University of Manchester
- Marijke van der Veen – Emerita Professor of Archaeology, University of Leicester
- Elizabeth Watts – Operatic soprano
- Howard Williams – Professor of Archaeology, University of Chester
- Rebecca Wragg Sykes – co-founders, TrowelBlazers
- Mark Collard – Professor of Archaeology, Simon Fraser University

== Rankings ==
In the 2020 QS World University Rankings Sheffield's Department of Archaeology was ranked 29th globally amongst a list of 201 universities. The same year, the National Student Survey found that the department has an overall satisfaction of 91% amongst students; the department was amongst the top 10 archaeology departments in the UK by this measure.
