= Saltfleet =

Coastal village in the East Lindsey district of Lincolnshire, England

Coordinates: 53.422697°N 0.185272°E

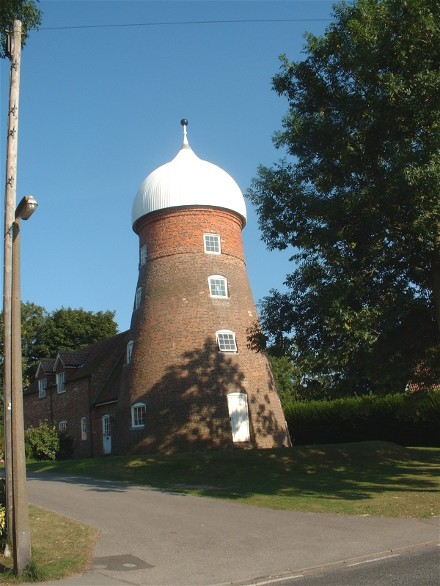
- Saltfleet Mill

- Location within Lincolnshire
- Population: 543 (2011)
- OS grid reference: TF453939
  - London: 135 mi (217 km) S
- Civil parish: Skidbrooke with Saltfleet Haven
- District: East Lindsey
- Shire county: Lincolnshire
- Region: East Midlands
- Country: England
- Sovereign state: United Kingdom
- Post town: Louth
- Postcode district: LN11 7
- Police: Lincolnshire
- Fire: Lincolnshire
- Ambulance: East Midlands
- UK Parliament: Louth and Horncastle

Saltfleet is a coastal village in the East Lindsey district of Lincolnshire, England. It is approximately 8 miles (13 km) north of Mablethorpe and 11 miles (18 km) east of Louth.

The village is part of the civil parish of Skidbrooke with Saltfleet Haven, which had a population of 523 at the 2001 Census, increasing to 543 at the 2011 Census.

Saltfleet has a village store with adjoining cafe, a petrol station, a seasonal fish and chip shop and caravan sites. The beaches at Saltfleet attract visitors for days out and holidays, some of whom gather samphire on the coast close to the village.

== History ==
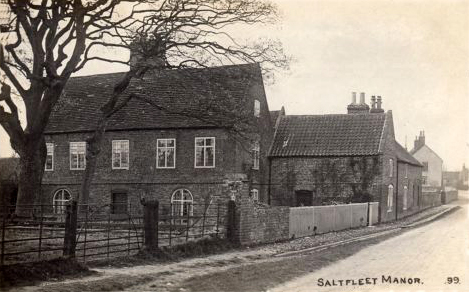
Saltfleet Manor House c. 1900

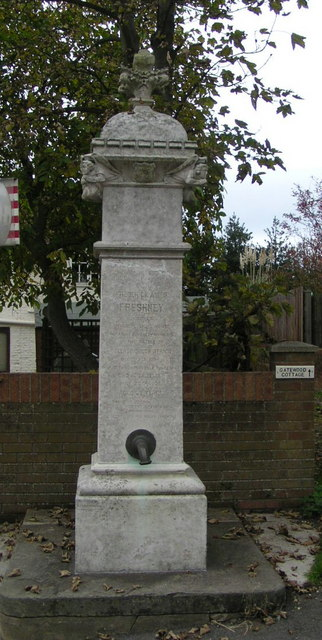
Memorial village pump

The parish church is a Grade I listed building, dedicated to Saint Botolph, dating from the 13th century. The font is 13th-century. There is a gravestone to a rector of the parish who died in 1413, set in the chancel floor. The church is now redundant.

Saltfleet has a Grade II listed 19th-century windmill. There are two public houses; the New Inn, a Grade II listed building, dating from the 17th century, and The Crown Inn, which is over 200 years old.

Opposite the New Inn is the Manor House, built in 1673, a date referred to as inscribed against the names of Robert Fox and Jane Hardy in a first floor room. Lincolnshire Life magazine published articles on the Manor House: in February 2008 in its Homes and Gardens page; in May 1970; and during the 1960s when it mentioned former occupants, including the 1670s owner, Lord Willoughby, a friend of Oliver Cromwell.

Adjacent to the Manor House is a red brick Methodist chapel dating from 1815.

A listed limestone village pump was erected in 1899 in memory of F. A. Freshney who died from wounds inflicted while fighting in South Africa.

Some Roman pottery has been found in the village.

== Governance ==
An electoral ward in the same name exists. This ward stretches south west to Little Carlton with a total population taken at the 2011 census of 2,066.

== Geography and ecology ==
A section of the parish seashore is salt marsh between Saltfleet and the North Sea. Many halophyte plant species are found there including Armeria maritima, Halimione portulacoides and Limonium vulgare. Wildlife includes skipper butterfly, shore crab and sky lark. 1.2 miles (2 km) south of the village is Saltfleetby-Theddlethorpe Dunes National Nature Reserve. Grey seals breed 3.7 miles (6 km) north in Donna Nook nature reserve within the Saltfleet and North Somercotes parishes.
