= Mark Collard =

British–Canadian anthropologist

- Born: 1968 (age 57–58)
- Education: University of Sheffield (BA); University of Liverpool (PhD)
- Known for: Human evolution and evolutionary approaches to archaeology
- Awards: Canada Research Chair (2007–present); Fellow of the Society of Antiquaries of London (2015)
- Scientific career
- Fields: Biological anthropology Archaeology; Human evolutionary studies
- Institutions: Simon Fraser University University of British Columbia; Washington State University University College London
- Doctoral advisor: Bernard Wood

Mark Collard (born 1968) is a British–Canadian anthropologist known for research on human evolution and evolutionary approaches to archaeology. He is based in the Department of Archaeology at Simon Fraser University (SFU) in Burnaby, British Columbia, Canada.

== Biography ==
Collard was born and raised in the United Kingdom, mostly in Essex, a county east of London. He now lives in Vancouver, British Columbia.

== Education ==
After graduating from high school, Collard trained as a stockbroker in the City of London. The Black Monday stock market crash of 1987 prompted a change in career, and in 1990 he began pursuing a BA in archaeology and prehistory at the University of Sheffield, with politics as a secondary subject. At Sheffield, his main mentors were the hunter-gatherer specialist Marek Zvelebil and the bioarchaeologist Andrew Chamberlain.

He graduated in the summer of 1993 and later that year moved to the Department of Anatomy and Cell Biology at the University of Liverpool to pursue a PhD under the supervision of palaeoanthropologist Bernard Wood. In 1997, Collard was awarded a three-year Wellcome Trust Bioarchaeology Postdoctoral Fellowship and joined the Department of Anthropology at University College London, where he worked under the supervision of palaeoanthropologist Leslie Aiello.

== Career ==
At the end of his postdoctoral fellowship, Collard was appointed to a lecturership (equivalent to a tenure-track assistant professorship in North America) in the Department of Anthropology at University College London. In 2003, he moved to the Department of Anthropology at WashingtonState University–Pullman as an assistant professor. Eighteen months later, he took up an assistant professorship in the Department of Anthropology at the University of British Columbia–Vancouver.

In July 2007, he was appointed the Tier 2 Canada Research Chair in Human Evolutionary Studies and an associate professor in the Department of Archaeology at Simon Fraser University. He was promoted to full professor in 2011 and his Canada Research Chair was upgraded to Tier 1 in 2017.

== Research ==
Collard’s research is characterised by the application of evolutionary theory and quantitative analytical techniques to archaeological and anthropological data. His publications address topics including the origin and evolution of genus Homo, the reconstruction of hominin phylogenetic relationships, and the identification of species in the human fossil record. He has also worked on cultural transmission, technological evolution in small-scale societies, and the long-term relationship between environmental change and conflict. In addition, Collard has conducted studies reconstructing past human migration events and has contributed to the interdisciplinary fields of evolutionary medicine and the cognitivescience of religion.

== Media coverage ==
Collard’s research has been discussed in a number of media outlets. For example, studies he co-authored on Neanderthal clothing use and prehistoric behaviour were reported in New Scientist and The Observer.

Research involving Viking population history and social organisation has also been covered in The Daily Telegraph and Live Science.

Other research on human evolution and the classification of fossil species has been discussed in outlets including The Globe and Mail, EARTH Magazine and Live Science.

Additional work on prehistoric symbolism has also been discussed in Hyperallergic.

== Honours and awards ==
- Fellow of the Society of Antiquaries of London (2015-present)
- Canada Research Chair in Human Evolutionary Studies (2007–present)

== Selected publications ==
- Buchanan, B.; Collard, M. (2007). Investigating the peopling of North America through cladistic analyses of Early Paleoindian projectile points. Journal of Anthropological Archaeology. 26:366–393.
- Collard, M.; Edinborough, K.; Shennan, S. J.; Thomas, M. G. (2010). Radiocarbon evidence indicates that migrants introduced farming to Britain. Journal of Archaeological Science. 37: 866–870.
- Collard, M.; Shennan, S. J.; Tehrani, J. J. (2006). Branching, blending and the evolution of cultural similarities and differences among human populations. Evolution and Human Behavior. 27: 169–184.
- Collard, M.; Tarle, L.; Sandgathe, D.; Allan, A. (2016). Faunal evidence for a difference in clothing use between Neanderthals and early modern humans in Europe. Journal of Anthropological Archaeology. 44B: 235–246.
- Collard, M.; Wood, B. A. (2000). How reliable are human phylogenetic hypotheses? Proceedings of the National Academy of Sciences. 97: 5003–5006.
- McCauley, B. M.; Collard, M.; Sandgathe, D. (2020). A cross-cultural survey of on-site fire use by recent hunter-gatherers. Journal of Paleolithic Archaeology. 3: 566–584.
- Plomp, K. A.; Vidarsdottir, U. S.; Weston, D. A.; Dobney, K.; Collard, M. (2015). The ancestral shape hypothesis. BMC Evolutionary Biology. 15: 68.
- Raffield, B.; Price, N.; Collard, M. (2017). Male-biased operational sex ratios and the Viking phenomenon. Evolution and Human Behavior. 38: 315–324.
- Tehrani, J. J.; Collard, M. (2002). Investigating cultural evolution through biological phylogenetic analyses of Turkmen textiles. Journal of Anthropological Archaeology. 21: 443–463.
- Vaesen, K.; Collard, M.; Cosgrove, R.; Roebroeks, W. (2016). Population size does not explain past changes in cultural complexity. Proceedings of the National Academy of Sciences. 113: E2241–E2247.
- Wood, B. A.; Collard, M. (1999). The human genus. Science. 284: 65–71.
