= Sara Champion =

British archaeologist (1946–2000)

- Born: Sara Hermon; 11 November 1946
- Died: 14 May 2000 (aged 53)
- Occupations: Archaeologist; Lecturer
- Title: Doctor of Philosophy
- Spouse: Timothy Champion
- Children: 2, including Will Champion

Academic background
- Doctoral advisor: Christopher Hawkes at St High's College, Oxford University for Doctoral degree
- Other advisor: Stuart Piggott at University of Edinburgh for Master's Degree

Academic work
- Discipline: Archaeology
- Institutions: University of Southampton
- Main interests: Iron Age, Women in Archaeology, Irish Archaeology, Dendrochronology

Sara Champion (nee Hermon) (11 November 1946 – 14 May 2000) was a British archaeologist with an interest in the European Iron Age and the role and visibility of women working in archaeology. She was editor of PAST, the newsletter of The Prehistoric Society from 1997 until her death in 2000. The Prehistoric Society hosts an annual Sara Champion Memorial Lecture.

== Early life and education ==
Champion was born Sara Hermon, the second of four children. The family lived in Kenya and Tanzania (Tanganyika at the time) for six years of her childhood. Champion later attended Benenden School. After Benenden, Champion attended the University of Edinburgh, where she studied for her first degree and a master's degree in archaeology under Stuart Piggott and Charles Thomas. In 1968 Champion moved to St Hugh's College, Oxford, where she studied for a D.Phil. under the supervision of Christopher Hawkes concentrating on the Early European Iron Age.

== Academic and Archaeological work ==
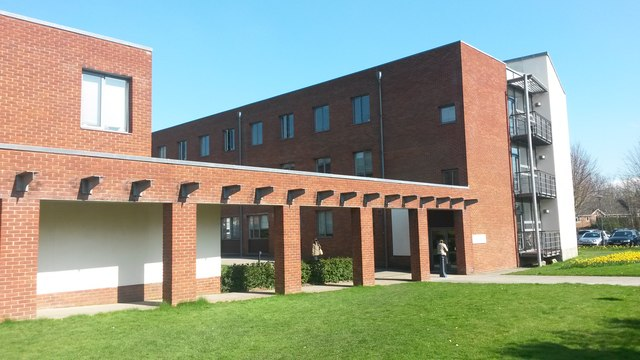
Avenue Campus at the University of Southampton, where the Department of Archaeology is located.

Sara Champion spent time at the University of Galway in Ireland, before moving to the University of Southampton in 1972, where she undertook a two-year fellowship in archaeology. She carried out excavations at sites like Dragonby, and in Hampshire an important Iron Age site near Andover. Sara was then made a Hartley Fellow in the Department of Archaeology, later becoming a Research Fellow in that department. She also lectured archaeology at the University of Southampton, as well as Adult and Continuing Education courses. In addition to research and teaching, Sara undertook other roles being a member of the National Trust Archaeology Panel, a chief examiner of the NEAB Archaeology A-level Board, and a field monument warden in West Hampshire and Dorset for English Heritage, overseeing the upkeep and preservation of scheduled monuments. Champion understood the importance of media, electronic publications and bibliographical searches very early, as well as the overall potential of the internet for archaeology and she lectured and wrote articles on the application of internet resources in the teaching of archaeology, and electronic archaeology. She also spoke at several events on this topic including various IFA conferences. Another area of research and interest was role the visibility of women in archaeology.

Sara Champion was a published author with publications on a range of topics from the Iron Age, to women in archaeology and Irish folklore. She was the editor for the Prehistoric Society's newsletter PAST.

Six years after Champion's death a seminar room in the Crawford Building, the new building for the archaeology department at the University of Southampton, was named in her honour.

== Personal life ==
Champion met Timothy Champion (future President of the Royal Archaeological Institute and The Prehistoric Society) while studying at Oxford and they were married in 1970 at St Paul's Church in Knightsbridge. In 1972 the Champions moved to Southampton, where their two sons, Edward and William (the drummer of Coldplay), were born, in the mid-1970s, and 1978 respectively.

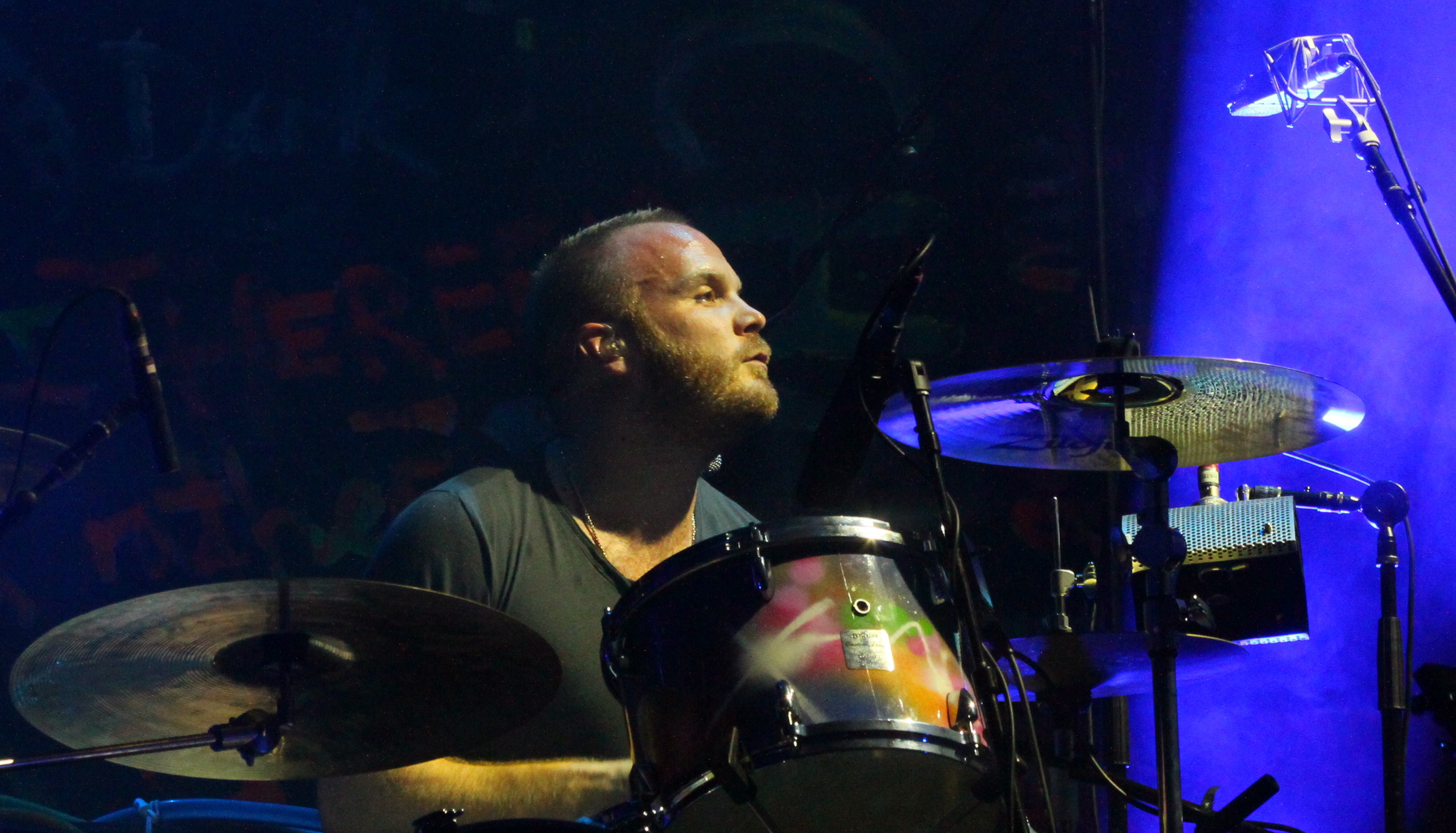
Photo of Will Champion behind a drumkit on a live gig.

Champion's interests outside archaeology included music (she regularly djed at departmental and archaeological social gatherings) and she was a long-term member of the Southampton Philharmonic Choir.

Champion died of cancer in May 2000. The band Coldplay, of which her son Will is a member, dedicated their debut album Parachutes to her on its release in July 2000.

== Selected publications ==
- 1970 "The Hillforts of the Cotteswold Scarp, with Special Reference to Recent Excavations", Proceedings of the Cotteswold Naturalists' Field Club 36, 18-23
- 1971 "Excavations at Leckhampton Hill; 1969–70 Interim Report", Transactions of the Bristol & Gloucestershire Archaeological Society 90, 5-21
- 1973 Andover – The Archaeological Implications of Development Andover and District Excavation Committee
- 1976 "Leckhampton Hill, Gloucestershire – 1925 and 1970", in Hillforts: Later Prehistoric Earthworks in Britain and Ireland, ed. D. W. Harding, 177-191
- 1980 A Dictionary of Terms and Techniques in Archaeology. Oxford: Phaidon Press Ltd
- 1980 "Dendrochronology", Nature 284, 663–664
- 1995 "Archaeology and the internet", Field Archaeologist 24, 18–19
- 1997 "Special Review Section. Electronic Archaeology", Antiquity 71, co-authored with Christopher Chippindale
- 1998 "Women in British Archaeology. Visible and Invisible," in Excavating Women. A History of Women in European Archaeology, Andreu, M. Diaz and Sørensen, M.-L.S. (eds), London, 175–197.

== Sara Champion Memorial Lectures ==
The Prehistoric Society's annual Sara Champion Memorial Lectures are held every October at the Society of Antiquaries of London lecture theatre in Burlington House, Piccadilly, London. The 10th annual lecture, due to be held in October 2010, was deferred and instead a debate was held to celebrate the 75th anniversary of the Prehistoric Society. The Sara Champion Debate had the topic "This House believes that the study of the Stone Ages has contributed more to our knowledge of the human condition than study of the Metal Ages" and was led by Clive Gamble and Tim Champion.

The 2020–2021 lecture numbering system seems to have missed one out: the 20th Sara Champion Memorial Lecture.

Lecture	Date	Title	Lecturer	Reference
1st Sara Champion Memorial Lecture	24 October 2001	"A new cart/chariot burial from Wetwang, East Yorkshire"	J D Hill	
2nd Sara Champion Memorial Lecture	30 October 2002	"The development of Bronze Age society in north Munster"	Carleton Jones	
3rd Sara Champion Memorial Lecture	15 October 2003	"Social change in later prehistory: evidence from the northern roundhouse"	Rachel Pope	
4th Sara Champion Memorial Lecture	27 October 2004	"The Irish Sea connection: exploring the origins of monumentality in western Britain"	Vicki Cummings	
5th Sara Champion Memorial Lecture	26 October 2005	"Seeing red: art, artefacts and colour in the Iron Age of Britain and Ireland"	Melanie Giles	
6th Sara Champion Memorial Lecture	October 2006			
7th Sara Champion Memorial Lecture	24 October 2007	"A crystal world from weeping stone: considering the relationships between Neolithic cave art and monument construction on Mendip"	Jodie Lewis	
8th Sara Champion Memorial Lecture	October 2008			
9th Sara Champion Memorial Lecture	October 2009			
10th Sara Champion Memorial Lecture	19 October 2011	"Creative destruction: middens at the end of the Bronze Age"	Kate Waddington	
11th Sara Champion Memorial Lecture	17 October 2012	"Tangled histories: British prehistorians, research practice and disciplinary change, 1975–2010"	Anwen Cooper	
12th Sara Champion Memorial Lecture	16 October 2013	"Making pots matter: social practice and early first millennium BC ceramics in East Anglia"	Matt Brudenell	
13th Sara Champion Memorial Lecture	22 October 2014	"'The personality of Britain' reconsidered: evaluating the relationship between the social and physical geographies of Bronze Age Britain (c. 2500–800 cal. BC)"	Neil Wilkin	
14th Sara Champion Memorial Lecture	28 October 2015	"The evolution of religious branding in later prehistoric Europe: the case of Urnfield and Hallstatt bird imagery"	Sebastian Becker	
15th Sara Champion Memorial Lecture	26 October 2016	"Antlerworking practices of the British Mesolithic: materials, identities and technologies within the landscape"	Ben Elliott	
16th Sara Champion Memorial Lecture	25 October 2017	"Making and breaking the British Iron Age: a holistic approach to craft and material culture"	Julia Farley	
17th Sara Champion Memorial Lecture	31 October 2018	"Though they but little... The Bronze Age funerary cups of Britain"	Claire Copper	
18th Sara Champion Memorial Lecture	30 October 2019	"Fragments of the Bronze Age. Destruction, deposition and personhood"	Matthew G. Knight	
19th Sara Champion Memorial Lecture	21 October 2020	"Becoming metallic: the emergence of metals in Britain and Ireland"	Rachel Crellin	
20th Sara Champion Memorial Lecture				
21st Sara Champion Memorial Lecture	20 October 2021	"Genetic change and relatedness in Chalcolithic and Early Bronze Age Britain"	Tom Booth	
22nd Sara Champion Memorial Lecture	19 October 2022	"'I see the hands of the generations' - perceiving the past through later prehistoric artefacts"	Sophia Adams	
23rd Sara Champion Memorial Lecture	16 October 2024	Into the woods: new methods for studying Palaeolithic organic technologies	Annemieke Mills	
