= Sarah Champion (disambiguation) =

Sarah Champion (born 1969) is a British Labour Party politician and MP for Rotherham.

Sarah Champion may refer to:

- Sarah Champion (journalist) (born 1970), British music journalist
- Sarah Champion (presenter) (born 1977), British television presenter and DJ

== See also ==
- Sara Champion (1946–2000), British archaeologist
- Sarah Campion (born 1983), English squash player
