= Rachel Crellin =

Manx archaeologist

Rachel Crellin FSA Scot. FHEA
- Occupations: Archaeology and university lecturer

Academic background
- Education: University of Cambridge; University College London; Newcastle University
- Thesis: Changing times: the emergence of a Bronze Age on the Isle of Man (2014)
- Doctoral advisor: Christopher J. Fowler

Academic work
- Discipline: Archaeology
- Sub-discipline: Archaeological theory; Prehistoric archaeology
- Institutions: University of Leicester

Rachel Crellin is an archaeologist who specialises in archaeological theory and the prehistory of the British Isles. She joined the University of Leicester in 2015, and is an Associate Professor of Archaeology. She is also a metalwork wear-analyst. In 2020 she delivered the Prehistoric Society's annual Sarah Champion Memorial Lecture and in 2021 she delivered the Royal Anthropological Institute's Curl Lecture.

== Education ==
Crellin is from the Isle of Man, and studied her BA in Archaeology and Anthropology at the University of Cambridge, and later completed her MA in Material and Visual Culture Studies at University College London. She completed a PhD at Newcastle University and focused on the transition from the Late Neolithic into the Early Bronze Age on the Isle of Man

== Career ==
In 2015, Crellin joined the University of Leicester as a Leverhulme Early Careers Fellow, where she undertook a study into the impact of Bronze axes in the British Isles. Between 2016 and 2022, Crellin collaborated with Chris Fowler of Newcastle University to lead the "Round Mounds of the Isle of Man" project; the work was jointly funded by Manx National Heritage and Culture Vannin. In 2018 she was appointed to the position of Lecturer in Prehistoric archaeology, where she teaches both in-person as well as on the remote course of Ancient History and Archaeology.

== Selected publications ==
In 2020, Routledge published Crellin's book on archaeological theory, Change and Archaeology. In a review for Antiquity, Dan Lawrence wrote "One of the great strengths of this book is the clarity of the discussion of theoretical ideas and concepts". Crellin co-authored Archaeological Theory in Dialogue: Situating Relationality, Ontology, Posthumanism, and Indigenous Paradigms with Craig N. Cipolla, Lindsay M. Montgomery, Oliver J. T. Harris, and Sophie V. Moore; in a review for American Antiquity, Eleanor Harrison-Buck noted that they "do an excellent job of making these otherwise complex concepts more accessible". Crellin also co-authored Bronze Age Combat: An Experimental Approach with Raphael Hermann, Marion Uckelmann, Quanyu Wang, and Andrea Dolfini.

Crellin has considered the past through a feminist perspective, culminating in the chapter titled "Posthumanist feminist archaeology" in the 2024 Routledge Handbook of Gender Archaeology.

=== Books ===
- Crellin, R.J. Cipolla, C., Montgomery, L., Harris, O.J.T. and Moore, S. 2021. Archaeological Theory in Dialogue: situating relationality, ontology, posthumanism and indigenous paradigms. London: Routledge.
- Crellin, R.J. 2020. Change and Archaeology. London: Routledge.
- Hermann, R., Crellin, R.J., Ucklemann, M. and Dolfini, A. 2020. Bronze Age Combat: an experimental approach. BAR. Oxford.

=== Journal articles ===
- Cobb, H. and Crellin, R.J. 2022. Affirmation and action: a posthumanist feminist archaeology. Cambridge Archaeological Journal.
- Cipolla, C.N., Crellin, R.J., and Harris, O.J.T. 2021. Posthuman Archaeologies, Archaeological Posthumanisms. Journal of posthumanism 1 (1): 5–21.
- Crellin, R.J. and Harris, O.J.T. 2021. What difference does posthumanism make? Cambridge Archaeological Journal 31 (3):469-75.
- Tsoraki, C., Barton, H., Crellin, R.J. and Harris, O.J.T. 2021. Making marks meaningful: new materialism, microwear and the world of material signs. World Archaeology 52 (3): 484–502.
- Fowler, C., Crellin, R.J. and Gamble, M. 2021. Diversity and change in mortuary practices in the Neolithic of the Isle of Man. Proceedings of the Prehistoric Society 87: 83–107.
- Crellin, R.J. and Harris, O.J.T. 2020. Beyond Binaries: interrogating ancient DNA. Archaeological Dialogues 27 (1): 37–56.
- Hermann, R., Crellin, R.J., Dolfini, A., Wang, Q., and Uckelmann, M. 2020. Bronze Age swordsmanship: new insights from experiments and wear analysis. Journal of Archaeological Method and Theory 27: 1040–1083.
- Crellin, R.J. 2018. Examining the British and Irish Early Bronze Age Flat Axes of the Greenwell Collection at the British Museum. Journal of Archaeological Science: Reports 18: 858–888.
- Crellin, R.J. 2017. Violent Times? Use-wear analysis of bronze weapons from the Isle of Man. Isle of Man Studies XV
- Dolfini, A. and Crellin, R.J. 2016. Metalwork wear analysis: the loss of innocence. Journal of Archaeological Science 66: 78–87.

=== Awards and honours ===
- Crellin is a Fellow of both the Higher Education Academy and the Society of Antiquaries of Scotland
- Crellin delivered the 2020 Prehistoric Society's Sara Champion Lecture on the emergence of metals in Britain and Ireland
- Crellin delivered the 2021 Royal Anthropological Institute's Curl lecture which is given biannually
