= Paul Pettitt =

British archaeologist

- Born: Paul Barry Pettitt
- Other name: Paul B. Pettitt
- Citizenship: United Kingdom
- Education: University of Birmingham; University College London; University of Cambridge
- Scientific career
- Fields: Archaeology of the Palaeolithic; Cave art Lithics; Burial archaeology
- Workplaces: University of Oxford; Keble College, Oxford; University of Sheffield; Durham University
- Thesis: Tool reduction models, primary flaking, and lithic assemblage variability in the Middle Palaeolithic of southwest France (1999)

Paul Barry Pettitt, FSA is a British archaeologist and academic. He specialises in the Palaeolithic era, with particular focus on claims of art and burial practices of the Neanderthals and Pleistocene Homo sapiens, and methods of determining the age of artefacts from this time. Since 2013, he has been Professor of Archaeology at Durham University. He previously taught at Keble College, Oxford and the University of Sheffield.

== Early life and education ==
Pettitt studied ancient history and archaeology at the University of Birmingham and graduated with a Bachelor of Arts (BA) degree in 1991. He undertook postgraduate studies in archaeology at the Institute of Archaeology, University College London, and graduated with a Master of Arts (MA) degree in 1992. He undertook postgraduate research at the University of Cambridge and graduated with a Doctor of Philosophy (PhD) degree in 1999. His doctoral thesis was titled "Tool reduction models, primary flaking, and lithic assemblage variability in the Middle Palaeolithic of southwest France".

== Academic career ==
In 1995, Pettitt began his academic career as an archaeologist at the Radiocarbon Accelerator Unit of the University of Oxford; having been promoted to senior archaeologist, he left this position in 2001. From 1997, he was additionally a research fellow and tutor in Archaeology and Anthropology at Keble College, Oxford.

From 2003 to 2012, he taught and researched Palaeolithic archaeology at the University of Sheffield. Having started at Sheffield as a Lecturer, he was promoted to Senior Lecturer in 2007, and to Reader in Palaeolithic Archaeology in 2010. In January 2013, he joined Durham University as Professor of Archaeology. In 2022, he was Lady Davis Visiting professor at the Hebrew University of Jerusalem in Israel.

Pettitt's research focuses on the Middle and Upper Palaeolithic in Europe. In 2003, he co-discovered the earliest cave art in Britain at Creswell Crags. In 2008, 2009 and 2011, he co-directed excavations in Kents Cavern.

He is a member of the editorial board of World Archaeology journal.

== Honours ==
On 19 June 2008, Pettitt was elected a Fellow of the Society of Antiquaries of London (FSA).

== Selected works ==
- Pettitt, Paul; Bahn, Paul; Ripoll, Sergio, eds. (2007). Palaeolithic cave art at Creswell Crags in European context. Oxford: Oxford University Press. ISBN 978-0199299171.
- Bahn, Paul; Pettitt, Paul (2009). Britain's oldest art: the Ice Age cave art of Creswell Crags. Swindon: English Heritage. ISBN 978-1848020252.
- Pettitt, Paul (2010). The Palaeolithic origins of human burial. Londond: Routledge. ISBN 978-0415354899.
- Pettitt, Paul; White, Mark (2012). The British Palaeolithic: hominin societies at the edge of the Pleistocene world. London: Routledge. ISBN 978-0415674546.
- Pettitt, Paul (2022). Homo Sapiens Rediscovered. London, UK: Thames and Hudson. ISBN 978-0-500-25263-5.
