= William George Clarke =

William George Clarke or W. G. Clarke may refer to:

- W. G. Clarke (1859–1943), Australian Methodist minister
- W. G. Clarke (writer) (1877–1925), English journalist, naturalist, and archaeologist
