= David L. Kennedy =

British archaeologist and historian

David Kennedy AM
- Born: David Leslie Kennedy; 25 April 1948 (age 78); Montrose, Scotland
- Citizenship: United Kingdom and Australia
- Education: University of Manchester; University of Oxford
- Known for: Archaeology and history of the Roman Near East, Aerial Archaeology of the Middle East, Roman military studies, Kite studies
- Scientific career
- Fields: Archaeology; History
- Workplaces: University of Sheffield; Boston University; University of Western Australia

David Leslie Kennedy (born 25 April 1948) is an archaeologist and historian of the Roman Near East, with a focus on Aerial Archaeology, Roman landscape studies and the Roman military. He is Emeritus Professor and Senior Honorary Research Fellow in Roman Archaeology and History at the University of Western Australia.

== Scholarship ==
David Kennedy's research focus is on the Roman Near East, with an emphasis on Jordan. His interests encapsulate Roman landscape studies, military studies, as well as Roman infrastructure in the Near East.

Kennedy established (1978) and directed (until 2018) the Aerial Photographic Archive for Archaeology in the Middle East (APAAME), a project designed to investigate, document and photograph archaeological sites throughout this region using remote sensing. This includes historical imagery and mapping, satellite imagery and aerial photography. The project is designed both to develop a methodology suited to the region and to illuminate settlement history in the Near East.

Between 1997 and 2018 Kennedy conducted annual aerial reconnaissance over Jordan as part of the Aerial Archaeology in Jordan project, the first – and until recently, only such programme in the Middle East. The project digitises and makes use of international collections, as well as increasing availability of satellite imagery through programs such as Google Earth and Bing in order to conduct wider surveys of the region. A brief video made by Google for its 'Search' series has been published on YouTube which explains the development of this process.

For two years from January 2018 to 2020 he was Director of the Aerial Archaeology in the Kingdom of Saudi Arabia (AlUla) (AAKSAU) and Aerial Archaeology in Kingdom of Saudi Arabia (Khaybar) (AAKSAK) projects. His other projects have included the Jarash Hinterland Survey with Fiona Baker (2005–2011), a rescue project at the Classical city of Zeugma on the Euphrates (1993–2001) and currently the Aerial Photographic Archive for Archaeology in the Middle East.

David Kennedy's work on aerial photography and satellite surveys has also resulted in part of his research being directed towards more ancient archaeological remains in the Near East, such as Desert Kites. Kennedy has been working on making research more accessible by publishing in iBook format, the first of which is the ibook which was made available on iTunes. In February 2016 an article titled was published on LiveScience which showcases some of the recent activity in this research area undertaken by David Kennedy and his team.
