= Umberto Albarella =

Archaeologist

- Citizenship: Italy and United Kingdom

Academic background
- Education: University of Naples; University of Durham
- Thesis: The archaeology of pig domestication and husbandry: approaches and case studies (2004)
- Doctoral advisor: Peter Rowley-Conwy

Academic work
- Institutions: University of Birmingham; University of Sheffield

Umberto Albarella is an Italian-British archaeologist and activist. He is Professor of Zooarchaeology at the Department of Archaeology, University of Sheffield.

== Education ==
Albarella graduated from the University of Naples with a degree in natural sciences. He developed an interest in anthropology and archaeology while an undergraduate in 1982. In 2004, he received a PhD from the University of Durham, supervised by Peter Rowley-Conwy.

== Career ==
Between 1993 and 1995 Albarella worked at the London branch of English Heritage. He was an archaeologist at the University of Birmingham from 1995 to 2000, and Durham University from 2000 to 2004. In 2004, Albarella joined the Department of Archaeology at the University of Sheffield as a research officer to expand and develop the zooarchaeology lab.

In 2007, Albarella published Pigs and humans: 10,000 years of interaction, which was the first major attempt at synthesising archaeological studies of pigs. The 2011 volume, EthnoZooArchaeology: The Past and Present of Human-Animal Relationships, was described as "important collection of papers for both ethnoarchaeologists and zooarchaeologists". He co-edited the Oxford Handbook of Zooarchaeology, published in 2017.

Albarella has served on the editorial boards of the journals Anthropozoologica, Environmental Archaeology and Medieval Archaeology. In 2002, he was elected onto the International Committee of ICAZ, and served as General Secretary of ICAZ from 2006 to 2012.

Albarella is a member of the ICAZ Committee of Honor, recognising individuals who have made a major contribution to archaeozoology.

== Selected publications ==
=== Books ===
- Albarella, Umberto, ed. (2001). Environmental Archaeology: Meaning and Purpose. Kluwer Academic Publishers. ISBN 9780306466014.
- Albarella, Umberto; Dobney, Keith; Ervynck, Anton; Rowley-Conwy, Peter (2007). Pigs and Humans: 10,000 Years of Interaction. Oxford University Press. ISBN 9780199207046.
- Albarella, Umberto; Trentacoste, Angela, eds. (2011). Ethnozooarchaeology: The Present and Past of Human–Animal Relationships. Oxbow Books. ISBN 9781842179970.
- Albarella, Umberto; Rizzetto, Mauro; Russ, Hannah; Vickers, Kim; Viner-Daniels, Sarah, eds. (2017). The Oxford Handbook of Zooarchaeology. Oxford University Press. ISBN 9780199686476.

=== Journal articles ===
- Albarella, Umberto; Payne, Sebastian (2005). "Neolithic pigs from Durrington Walls, Wiltshire, England: A biometrical database". Journal of Archaeological Science. 32 (4): 589–599. doi:10.1016/j.jas.2004.11.006.
- Albarella, Umberto; Tagliacozzo, Antonio; Dobney, Keith; Rowley-Conwy, Peter (2006). "Pig hunting and husbandry in prehistoric Italy: A contribution to the domestication debate". Proceedings of the Prehistoric Society. 72: 193–227. doi:10.1017/S0079497X00001837.
- Albarella, Umberto; Johnstone, Clare; Vickers, Kim (2008). "The development of animal husbandry from the Late Iron Age to the end of the Roman period: A case study from South-East Britain". Journal of Archaeological Science. 35 (7): 1828–1848. Bibcode:2008JArSc..35.1828A. doi:10.1016/j.jas.2007.11.016.
