= Barbara S. Ottaway =

British archaeologist

Barbara Ottaway
- Born: 1938 (age 87–88); Dresden, Germany
- Occupation: Professor

Academic background
- Education: PhD
- Alma mater: University of Edinburgh

Academic work
- Discipline: Archaeology
- Sub-discipline: Archaeometallurgy, Dendrochronology
- Institutions: University of Exeter

Barbara S. Ottaway (born 1938, Dresden, Germany) is a British archaeologist. She was previously a Reader in Archaeology in the Department of Archaeology, University of Sheffield, and Professor in Archaeology at the University of Exeter. Her research primarily focusses on early copper metallurgy and the prehistory of central and south-eastern Europe. Ottaway has also written on her experiences growing up in Nazi-era Germany. She has been noted as an influential figure in the study of archaeometallurgy, metals analysis, and experimental archaeology.

== Early life and education ==
Barbara was born in Dresden in 1938 and spent the war years in Saxony, East Germany, before crossing over to West Germany in 1947 and later studying in West Berlin.

== Academic career ==
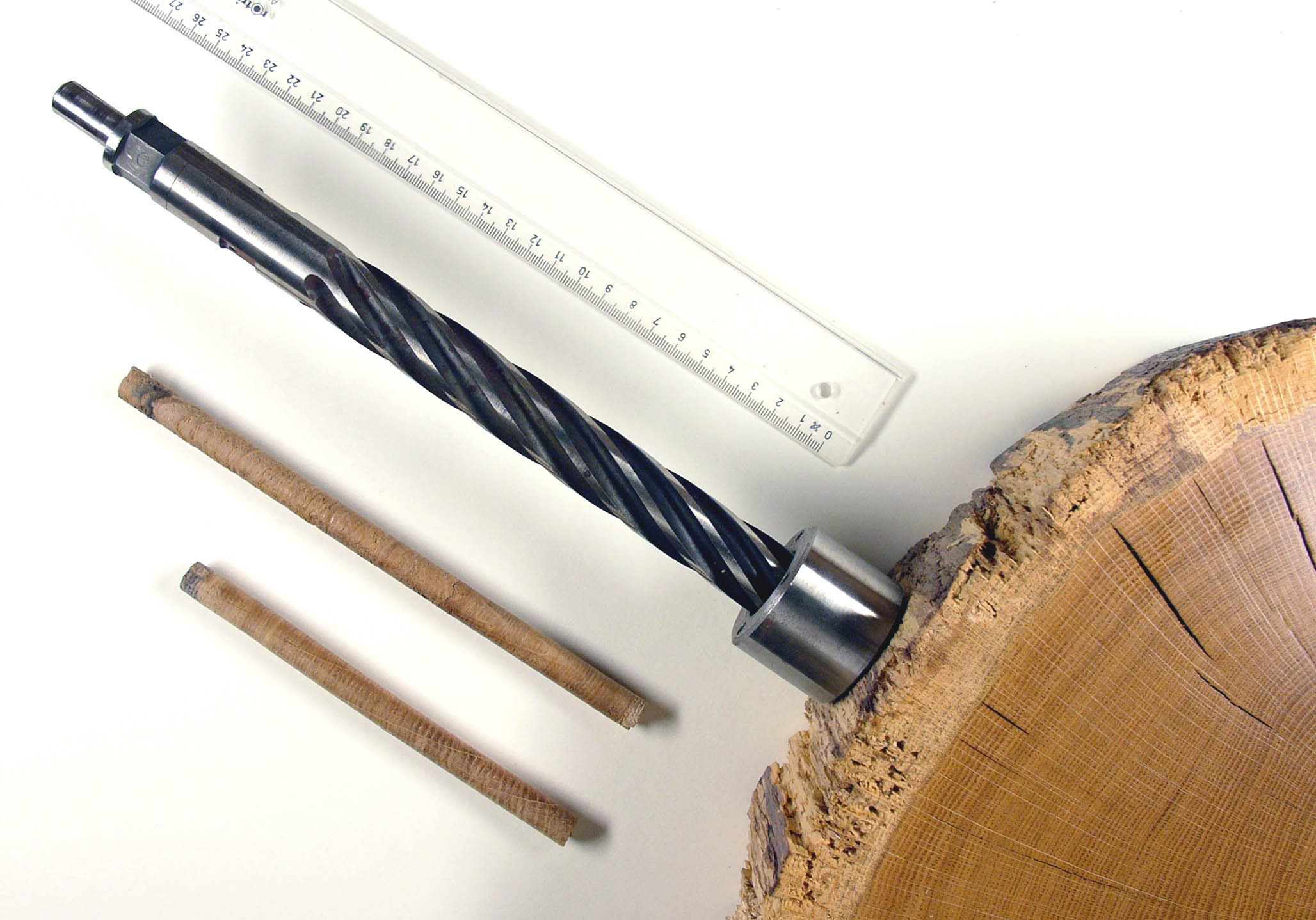
Dendrochronological drill

After working in German research laboratories, Barbara moved to Edinburgh in the early 1960s for employment within the biochemistry research laboratories of the university. While at Edinburgh, Ottaway's early research in archaeology focussed on radiocarbon dating and dendrochronology. In 1979 she was awarded a PhD in archaeology focused on ancient metallurgy in the northern sub-alpine area. She became a Reader in Archaeology in the Department of Archaeology, University of Sheffield in the early 1990s and developed a greater focus on early metallurgy, and specifically copper metallurgy, in central and south-eastern Europe. While at Sheffield, Ottaway's developed field projects including excavations and surveys in southern Germany and Austria, and undertook extensive research in the application of experimental archaeology in archaeometallurgical research. She was a member of The Prehistoric Society's Council in the early 1990s.

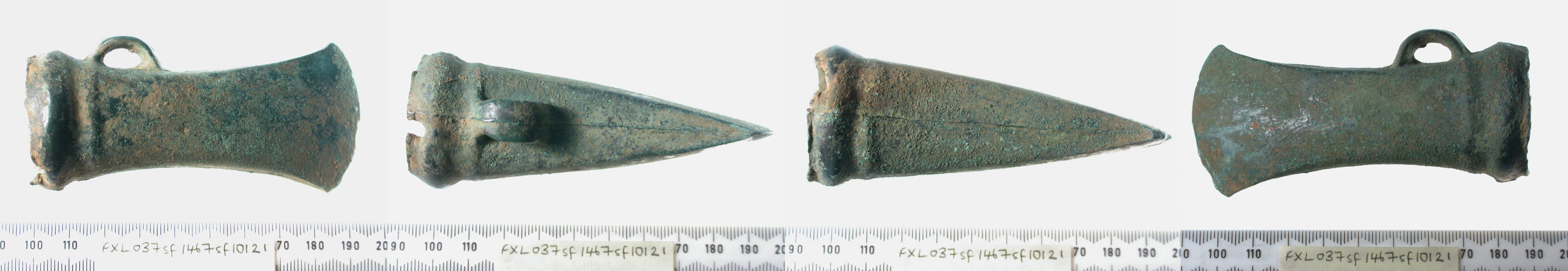
Socketed axe head

After taking a position at the University of Exeter, she consolidated research on socketed axes and sat on the Advisory Boards at the Mining Museum in Bochum, Germany and of HiMAT (History of Mining Activities in the Tyrol and Adjacent Areas) in Austria since its inception in 2005. She retired in the early 2000s. In 2009, an edited volume was published in her honor on archaeometallurgical research - Metals and societies : studies in honour of Barbara S. Ottaway.

== Selected publications ==
- Ottaway, B.S. 1979. Aspects of the Earliest Copper Metallurgy in the Northern Sub-Alpine area in its cultural setting. 2 vols. PhD thesis submitted to the University of Edinburgh
- Ottaway, B.S. (ed.) 1983. Archaeology, dendrochronology and the radiocarbon calibration curve. Edinburgh: University Department of Archaeology Occasional Paper No. 9
- Ottaway, B.S., 1999. Archaeological Relevance of Cs-Magnetometry. ICOMOS–Hefte des Deutschen Nationalkomitees, 33, pp. 69–69.
- Ottaway, B.S. 1999. A Changing Place: The Galgenberg in Lower Bavaria from the fifth to the first millennium BC, BAR International Series 752.
- Heeb, J. and Ottaway, B.S. 2014. Experimental Archaeometallurgy in B.W. Roberts & C. P. Thornton (eds), Archaeometallurgy in Global Perspective. Methods and Syntheses. Springer, p. 161-192
- Ottaway, B.S. and Mehta, R. (eds) 2015. Memories Unlocked Befreite Erinnerungen.
