= Alison Sheridan =

Archaeologist and museum curator

- Born: London
- Education: University of Cambridge (PhD)
- Occupation: Archaeologist
- Years active: 1979 till present
- Known for: Neolithic Chalcolithic & Bronze Age of Britain (particularly Scotland) and Ireland in its European context
- Notable work: Alison Sheridan 2026. The Sheridan Collection. Oxbow Reflections series, Oxford

Alison Sheridan FBA FSA FSA Scot FRSE is a British archaeologist. She joined National Museums Scotland in 1987 where she became Principal Curator of Early Prehistory. Her work has included the Early People gallery in the National Museum of Scotland in Edinburgh and the exhibitions: Heaven and Hell - and Other Worlds of the Dead (2000) and Amazing Amber (2013). After leaving the Museum in 2019 she became a Research Associate. She specialises in the Neolithic, Chalcolithic and Early Bronze Age of Britain and Ireland within their European context, with a focus on material culture and monumentality.

Sheridan was President of The Prehistoric Society from 2010 to 2014 and is Projet JADE Co-ordinator for Britain, Ireland, the Isle of Man and the Channel Islands as well as being the Chair of the Implement Petrology Group and a member of several Editorial Boards. Research topics include the Mesolithic–Neolithic transition and prehistoric jewellery of jet and jet-like materials, faience and amber.

Sheridan was elected to the Council of the Society of Antiquaries of Scotland in 2021 (re-elected in 2024) and is Vice President of Archaeology Scotland.

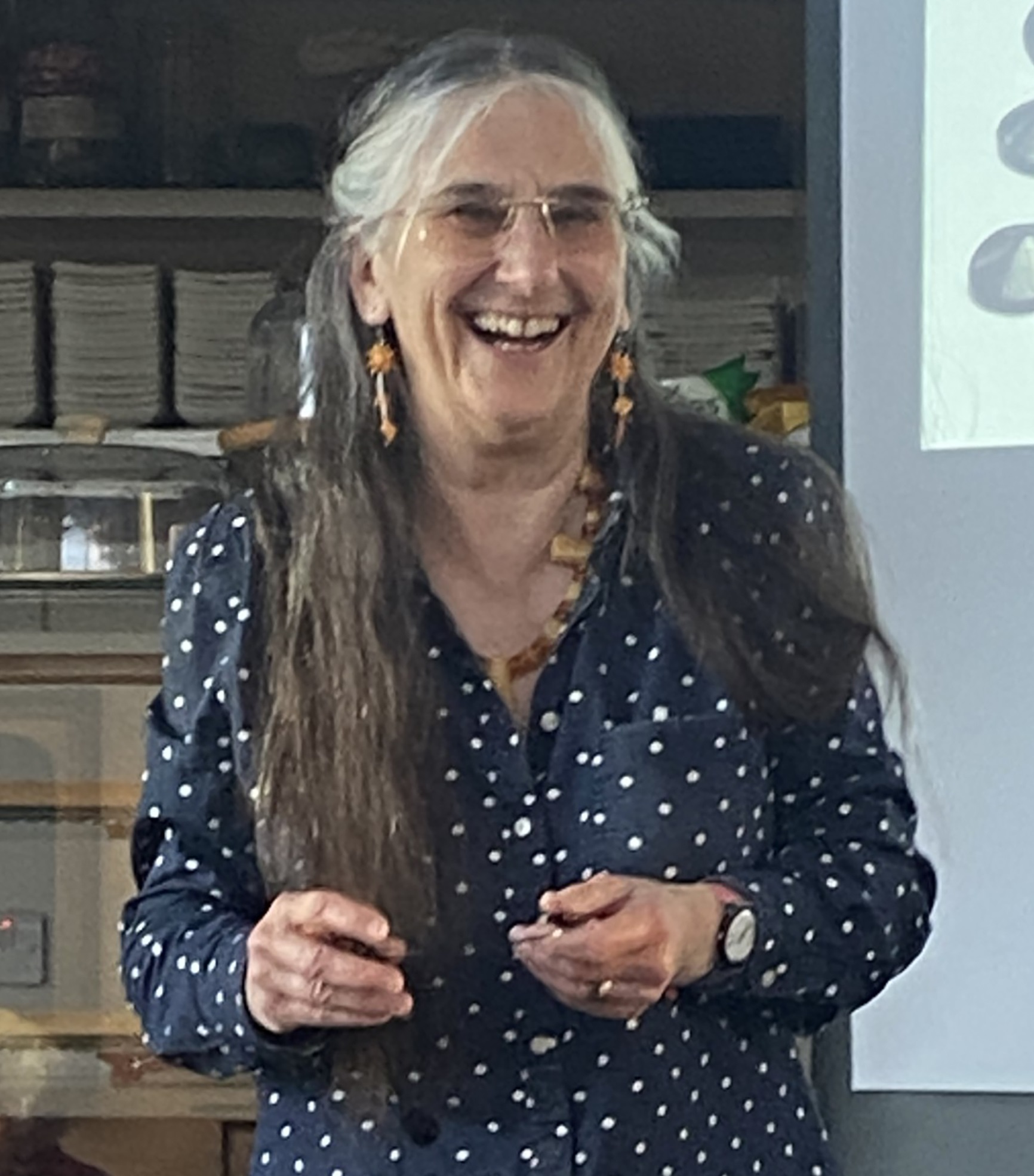
Alison Sheridan lecturing in April 2026

In 2026, Oxbow books published 'The Sheridan Collection' in their new Oxbow Reflections series, the third title in a series and the first of a female archaeologist.

== Education ==
Alison Sheridan studied Archaeology and Anthropology at the University of Cambridge, where she also completed her doctoral degree in 1985. Her work focused on ceramic production, exchange and social organisation in Neolithic Ireland.

== Awards and prizes ==
Sheridan was awarded the 2018 British Academy Grahame Clark Medal for outstanding work in prehistoric archaeology. In July 2019 she was elected Fellow of the British Academy.

In 2020 she was voted Archaeologist of the Year by Current Archaeology readers and presented the prestigious Rhind Lectures hosted by the Society of Antiquaries of Scotland on the topic of "Neolithic Scotland: the Big Picture and Detailed Narratives in 2020"

== Selected publications ==
Sheridan, A., Schulting, R., Quinnell, H. and Taylor, R. (2008) Revisiting a small passage tomb at Broadsands, Devon. Proceedings of the Devon Archaeological Society, 66, pp.1–26.

Sheridan, A. (2010) The Neolithization of Britain and Ireland: The “Big Picture”, in Finlayson, B.; Warren, G. (ed.) Landscapes in Transition. Oxford: Oxbow Books, pp. 89–105.

Sheridan, A. (2010) The earliest pottery in Britain and Ireland and its continental background, In Vanmontfort, B. (ed) Pots, Farmers and Foragers: Pottery traditions and social interaction in the earliest Neolithic of the Lower Rhine area. Amsterdam: Amsterdam University Press, pp. 189–207.

Sheridan, A. (2012) Contextualizing Kilmartin: building a narrative for developments in western Scotland and beyond, from the Early Neolithic to the Late Bronze Aze, in Jones, A. M.; Pollard, J.; Allen, M.; Gardiner, J. (ed.) Image, Memory and Monumentality. Archaeological engagements with the material world. Prehistoric Society Research Paper 5, Oxford: Oxbow Books, pp. 163–183.

Sheridan, A. (2026) The Sheridan Collection. Oxbow Reflections series. Oxford: Oxbow Books
