= Gypsum burial =

Romano-British funerary tradition

A gypsum burial is a Romano-British funerary tradition in which liquid gypsum was poured over a deceased person. The gypsum hardens into casts which leave impressions of the individuals in them.

== Description ==
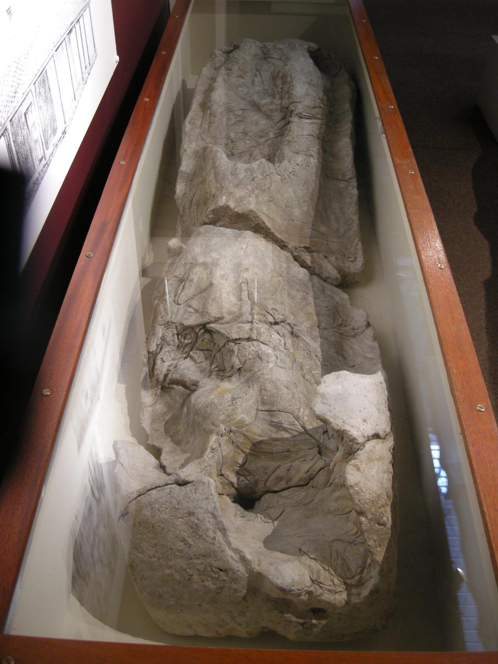
A Roman gypsum burial cast from York on display in the Yorkshire Museum.

The gypsum funerary custom involved pouring or applying gypsum over a deceased person who had been wrapped in a textile shroud and then placed into a lead and/or stone coffin beforehand. As the material dried and hardened, it created a cast of the body in the grave before it decomposed. Gypsum burial casts retain impressions of Romano-British people in their graves at the moment of their burial. Whilst the inclusion of white substances like chalk, lime, or gypsum used as a bedding is found in Roman graves elsewhere in Europe and North Africa, the particular tradition of mixing gypsum with water and using the resulting paste to cover the entire corpse in a grave is a tradition local to Roman Britain.

== Recent research ==
Maureen Carroll at the University of York was awarded a £1million grant from the Arts and Humanities Research Council in 2025 to undertake new research on the gypsum casts in Yorkshire, including creating 3D models of the impressions that allow new features to be seen for the first time. This research programme identified the presence of tyrian purple dye used on the textiles from at least two burials in York. Fingerprints on the outside of the gypsum casts have also been recently identified, showing that the material was probably applied as a soft paste rather than poured over the bodies.

== Distribution ==
More than 70 gypsum casts have been identified from Roman Britain, mostly from York and Yorkshire. This is a list of known gypsum casts in Roman Britain:

Site name	County	Discovery date	Details	References
A47 road scheme	Cambridgeshire	2024	Gypsum residue found only using residue analysis.	
Castleford	West Yorkshire	1966		
Colchester	Essex	2024	The "Lexden Lady" burial of an adult female in a decorated lead coffin.	
Hovingham	North Yorkshire	2024		
Hunslet	West Yorkshire	1823	Now lost.	
Langton	North Yorkshire	1929-30		
Malton	North Yorkshire	1929-30		
Pollington, near Doncaster	South Yorkshire	1949	Gypsum burial in sarchophagus with human remains associated.	
Sherburn in Elmet	North Yorkshire	1996		
Wetherby	West Yorkshire	1823	Now lost.	
York	North Yorkshire	Mostly 19th century	At least 57 gypsum burials.	

=== Public display ===
The Pollington burial was first put on public display in the Doncaster Museum in 1964. It was moved to the new Danum Gallery in 2021. A gypsum cast is on display in the Yorkshire Museum. The so-called Lexden Lady burial was placed on public display at the Colchester Roman Circus visitor centre in May 2026.
