= John Collis =

British prehistorian

John Collis (born 1944 in Winchester) is a British prehistorian. His first dig was in Longbridge Deverill with Christopher and Jacquetta Hawkes. He studied in Prague (with E. Soudská), Tübingen (with W. Kimmig) and Cambridge, where he studied from 1963 to 1970 and was awarded his PhD. He joined the Archaeology Department in Sheffield in 1972 and was made professor in 1990. He has acted as Head of Department and became Emeritus Professor there in October 2004.

His speciality is the European Iron Age. He has dug in Britain, Germany, Spain and central France, and appeared in two episodes of Channel 4's popular archaeology programme Time Team.

== Publications ==
- John Collis with contributions by Barry Ager, Wigber Low, Derbyshire, a Bronze Age and Anglian burial site in the White Peak (Sheffield, Dep. of Prehist. and Archaeol., Univ. of Sheffield 1983)
- John Barnatt; John Collis (1996). Barrows in the Peak District: Recent Research. J.R. Collis. ISBN 978-0-906090-50-3.
- John Collis (2003) [1984]. The European Iron Age. Routledge. ISBN 978-1-134-74637-8.
- John Collis (2003). The Celts: origins, myths & inventions. Tempus. ISBN 978-0-7524-2913-7.
- John Collis (2004) [1996]. Digging Up the Past: An Introduction to Archaeological Excavation. Sutton. ISBN 978-0-7509-3512-8.
- John Collis (1984). Oppida: Earliest Towns North of the Alps. Department of Prehistory and Archaeology, University of Sheffield. ISBN 978-0-906090-23-7.
- ed. by John Collis, Society and settlement in Iron Age Europe, actes du XVIIIe colloque de l'AFEAF, Winchester – April 1994; dedicated to the memory of Sara Champion 1946–2000 (Sheffield 2001). L' habitat et l'occupation du sol en Europe 11, 2001
