= Lexden Lady =

Roman burial discovered at Colchester in 2023

The Lexden Lady was a Romano-British woman who died at Camulodunum (Colchester, Essex) in the 3rd or 4th Centuries AD. Her remains were excavated from Lexden Road, Colchester in 2023.

== Discovery ==
The burial of the so-called "Lexden Lady" was identified during excavations at the site of the former Essex County Hospital during its redevelopment for housing.

== Biography ==
The Lexden Lady is identified from her remains in an inhumation burial within a lead coffin. She was in her 20s or 30s when she died. Glass vessels and jet hairpins were found in the grave, along with residues of frankincense and gypsum. These identify her as being of high-status in late Romano-British society. Her coffin was decorated with scallop shells and other decorations.

=== Public display ===
Her remains and coffin went on public display at the Roman Circus Visitor Centre in Colchester on 16 May 2026. The exhibition is titled "The Lexden Lady: From Burial to Biography".
