= John Wymer =

- Born: 5 March 1928; Surrey, England
- Died: 10 February 2006 (aged 77)
- Awards: Grahame Clark Medal (2002)
- Scientific career
- Fields: Archaeologist
- Institutions: University of East Anglia

John James Wymer (5 March 1928 – 10 February 2006) was a British archaeologist and one of the leading experts on the Palaeolithic period.

== Biography ==
Born near Kew Gardens in Surrey, Wymer was introduced to archaeology by his parents who would take him to gravel pits to search for ancient sites. He trained as a teacher but spent his spare time pursuing his passion for archaeology and never took a formal qualification in the discipline. In 1948 he married is first wife, Paula May, with whom he had five children.

He made his name in the field in July 1955 when at the age of 27 and still working as an amateur, he found the third piece of the oldest human skull in the British Isles while investigating the quarries at Swanscombe in Kent. This 400,000-year-old piece fitted with two previously found fragments and is part of the skull of Swanscombe Man, who is now considered to be a specimen of homo heidelbergensis.

In 1956 he took a job at Reading Museum which permitted him to devote more time to his enthusiastic lifelong interest in the study of handaxes and their makers. He helped redesign the galleries, wrote a description of the Moulsford gold torc and undertook an excavation at the classic Mesolithic site at Thatcham. In 1968 he published his first major work, Lower Palaeolithic Archaeology in Britain as represented by the Upper Thames Valley.

To gain wider experience Wymer, at the suggestion of the palaeontologist Louis Leakey, approached Ronald Singer, an anatomist, about working in South Africa. They worked together at Elandsfontein and Klasies River. At Elandsfontein Wymer's excavation of Cutting 10 located a localised grouping dominated by 49 large sharp Acheulian bifaces after Singer had previously found the 'Saldanha Man' skull. With Ronald Singer, a South African then at the University of Chicago, they exposed a remarkable stratigraphic sequence of more than 20m thick at Klasies River by digging a trench through the site. This spanned the entire Middle and Late Stone Age. He left South Africa suddenly in 1968.

On his return to England he worked at Hoxne, Sproughton, and Clacton. In 1976 he married his second wife, Mollie Spurling, after the dissolution of his first marriage in 1972. He lectured at the University of East Anglia in Norwich, writing The Palaeolithic Age (1982) and Palaeolithic Sites in East Anglia (1985). Later he worked for the Norfolk Archaeological Unit excavating sites from all periods.

In the 1990s, together with Wessex Archaeology he was commissioned by English Heritage to map and assess the known Palaeolithic sites across Britain. The published two volume The Lower Palaeolithic Occupation of Britain (1999) has become the key reference work for the period. Clive Gamble described it as archaeology's equivalent of Pevsener's The Buildings of England in providing the foundation stone for future study in the field.

Just before his death, he was closely involved in discoveries at Pakefield that put human occupation north of the Alps back by 200,000 years to c. 700,000 BP.

He was elected a fellow of the Society of Antiquaries in 1963 and was also a fellow of the British Academy as well as secretary of the Suffolk Institute of Archaeology and History from 1977 to 1984, a vice-president from 1985 and its president from 2001. In 1998 a festschrift was published in his honour. In 2002 the British Academy awarded him its Clark Medal for Prehistoric Archaeology. His honorary doctorate was awarded by the University of Reading in recognition of his decades of scholarship.

He is remembered by the archaeological community for his approachability, concision and enthusiasm as well as his exquisite technical drawings. Outside the field, he enjoyed real ale and playing the piano, with an especial fondness for the boogie-woogie style of Jimmy Yancey.

== Sources ==
- Eastern Daily Press obituary
- Gamble, C, John Wymer Independent obituary p 38, 17 March 2006
- Daily Telegraph obituary
- Pitts, M, John Wymer Guardian obituary

== See also ==
- The J.J.Wymer Archive
- List of fossil sites (with link directory)
- List of hominina (hominid) fossils (with images)
