= Hugh Willmott (archaeologist) =

British archaeologist (born 1972)

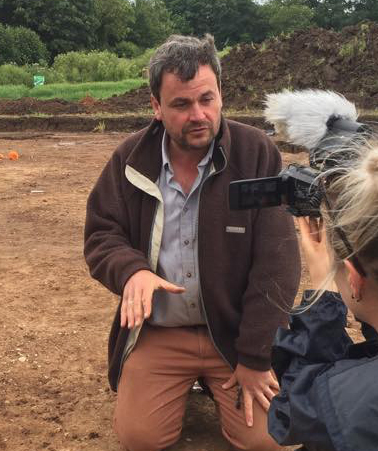
- Born: 1972 (age 53–54)
- Education: Durham University
- Occupation: Archaeologist
- Website: www.hugh-willmott.co.uk

Hugh Benedict Willmott FSA MCIfA (born 1972) is a British archaeologist and academic. He is a Senior Lecturer in the Department of Archaeology at the University of Sheffield. His research focuses on medieval England, with a particular interest in monastic archaeology.

== Biography ==
Willmott attended Durham University from 1991 to 1999, obtaining the degrees of BA, MA and PhD. He was an undergraduate at University College. On leaving university, he worked for a short period in commercial archaeology before being appointed a lecturer in archaeology at The University of Sheffield in 2004, where he was promoted to Senior Lecturer in 2010.

== Research ==
Willmott's research focuses on the archaeology of England between c. 600–1600 A.D. He has published on diverse topics such as glassmaking, dining, early ecclesiastical settlements and the Dissolution of the Monasteries.

Willmott's book, The Dissolution of the Monasteries in England and Wales, was nominated for the 2022 Book of the Year at the Current Archaeology Awards.

He has also directed a number of notable excavations;

- Middle Saxon monastery and later medieval settlement at West Halton (2003–2009)
- The Cluniac house at Monk Bretton Priory (2010)
- The medieval hospital and cemetery at Thornton Abbey, which included a mass grave relating to the Black Death (2011–2016)
- 7th-8th century AD ecclesiastical settlement at Little Carlton, (2015–2017)
- Late 5th-6th century AD Anglo-Saxon cemetery at Scremby (2017–2019)

== Professional and public engagement ==
In the past Willmott has served on the committees of The Finds Research Group, the Society for Post-Medieval Archaeology and The Royal Archaeological Institute. He is currently the chair of the Society for Church Archaeology and the archaeological advisor to the Diocese of Sheffield. He was elected a full member of the Chartered Institute for Archaeologists in 2002 and a fellow of the Society of Antiquaries of London in 2005. In 2017 Willmott was featured as one of the University of Sheffield's Inspirational Academics.

== Publications ==
=== Books ===
- The Dissolution of the Monasteries in England and Wales. (2020). ISBN 9781781799543
- Glass from the Gnalić Wreck. (2006). ISBN 9616328425
- A History of English Glassmaking AD43-1800 (2005) ISBN 0752431315
- Consuming Passions: Dining from Antiquity to the Eighteenth Century (2005) ISBN 0752434454
- Early Post-Medieval Vessel Glass in England (2002) ISBN 190277129X

=== Recent book chapters and papers ===
- Rethinking Early Medieval Productive Sites: wealth trade and tradition at Little Carlton, East Lindsey.
- A Black Death mass grave at Thornton Abbey: the discovery and examination of a fourteenth-century rural catastrophe.
- Of saints, sows or smiths? Copper-brazed iron handbells in Early Medieval England.
- Glaziers and the removal, recycling, and replacement of windows during the Reformation in England.
- Medieval cooking, dining and drinking.
- Excavations at the Priory of St. Mary Magdalene of Lund, Monk Bretton.
- Saxon glass furnaces at Glastonbury Abbey.
