= Collin Bowen =

Welsh archaeologist and landscape historian

H. C. Bowen OBE FSA
- Born: Harries Collin Bowen; 5 December 1919
- Died: 25 October 2011 (aged 91)
- Citizenship: United Kingdom

Academic background
- Education: Merton College, Oxford

Academic work
- Discipline: Archaeologist
- Sub-discipline: Landscape history; landscape archaeology; prehistory
- Institutions: Royal Commission on the Historical Monuments of England

Harries Collin Bowen, OBE, FSA (5 December 1919 – 25 October 2011) was a Welsh archaeologist and landscape historian. He served in the Royal Welch Fusiliers, British Army during the Second World War, and then studied history at Merton College, Oxford. From 1949 to his retirement in 1980, he worked for the Royal Commission on the Historical Monuments of England.

== Early life ==
Bowen was born on 5 December 1919, and was educated at Christ College, a private school in Brecon, Wales. He served in the British Army during the Second World War, having been called up in January 1940. He served in the Royal Welch Fusiliers for the next five years, and ended the war in the rank of captain. He studied modern history at Merton College, Oxford, graduating with a Bachelor of Arts (BA) degree in 1948.

== Career ==
Bowen spent his whole career working for the Royal Commission on the Historical Monuments of England (1949–1980). His first 20 years at the RCHME were spent recording the archaeological monuments of Dorset, which resulted in four published volumes. This included not just prehistoric earthworks and Roman sites, but also deserted medieval villages, deer parks and historic gardens, the latter of which had only just been recognised as being of historic interest. He then moved to recording the Iron Age and Roman Cotswolds, analysing the Bokerley Dyke of the Hampshire-Dorset border, and studying the river gravels of England. He was also a driving force behind Butser Ancient Farm, an archaeological open-air museum concerned with ancient farming practices that was established in 1970.

On 1 May 1958, Bowen was elected a Fellow of the Society of Antiquaries of London (FSA).

== Selected works ==
- A Matter of Time. An Archaeological Survey of the River Gravels of England. London: HMSO. 1960.
- Bowen, H. C. (1961). Ancient Fields: a tentative analysis of vanishing earthworks and landscapes. London: The British Association for the Advancement of Science.
- Wainwright, G. J.; Bowen, H. C. (1979). Gussage All Saints: an Iron Age settlement in Dorset. London: HMSO.
- Bowen, H. C. (1990). The Archaeology of Bokerley Dyke. London: HMSO.
