= Grahame Clark Medal =

Award in prehistoric archaeology

The Grahame Clark Medal is awarded by the British Academy every two years "for academic achievement involving recent contributions to the study of prehistoric archaeology". It was endowed in 1992 by Sir Grahame Clark, an eminent prehistorian and archaeologist, and first awarded in 1993.

== List of recipients ==
Source: British Academy

- 1993: Stuart Piggott
- 1995: John Coles
- 1997: J. D. Clark
- 1999: D. J. Mulvaney
- 2002: John Wymer
- 2004: Barrington W. Cunliffe
- 2006: Geoffrey J. Wainwright
- 2008: Paul Mellars
- 2010: Richard Bradley
- 2012: Charles Higham
- 2014: Joan Oates, "to recognise her reputation as one of the leading authorities on Mesopotamian prehistory as well as her fundamental contributions to our understanding of ancient Near Eastern Civilisation."
- 2016: Kristian Kristiansen, "for his contribution to the study of the European Bronze Age, and the management, protection and interpretation of archaeological heritage."
- 2018: Alison Sheridan, "for her outstanding research and wide-ranging contribution to the study of early prehistory."
- 2020: Frances Healy
- 2022: Alex Gibson
- 2023: Ann Woodward
- 2024: Nick Ashton
- 2025: Chantal Conneller

== See also ==
- List of archaeology awards
- Awards of the British Academy
