= Oxford Journal of Archaeology =

Journal

- Discipline: Archaeology
- Language: English
- Edited by: Nicholas Purcell, Barry Cunliffe, Helena Hamerow, Chris Gosden

Publication details
- History: 1982-present
- Publisher: John Wiley & Sons
- Frequency: Quarterly

Standard abbreviations
- ISO 4: Oxf. J. Archaeol.

Indexing
- CODEN: OJARE2
- ISSN: 0262-5253 (print); 1468-0092 (web)
- LCCN: 84646474
- OCLC no.: 37447158

Links
- Journal homepage; Online access; Online archive; Journal page at School of Archaeology (University of Oxford)

The Oxford Journal of Archaeology is a quarterly peer-reviewed academic journal published by John Wiley & Sons on behalf of the School of Archaeology, University of Oxford. It was established in 1982 and the editors-in-chief are Nicholas Purcell, Barry Cunliffe, Helena Hamerow, and Chris Gosden (University of Oxford).

== Abstracting and indexing ==
The journal is abstracted and indexed in:

- Academic Search
- Anthropological Literature
- Arts & Humanities Citation Index
- Archaeology Data Service Library (formerly the British & Irish Archaeological Bibliography)
- CSA Biological Sciences Database
- CSA Environmental Sciences & Pollution Management Database
- Current Contents/Arts & Humanities
- Ecology Abstracts
- GEOBASE
- GeoRef
- International Bibliography of the Social Sciences
- Linguistics & Language Behavior Abstracts
- ProQuest databases
- Scopus
