= Geoffrey Wainwright (archaeologist) =

British archaeologist (1937–2017)

Geoffrey Wainwright MBE FSA FRSA FLSW
- Born: 19 September 1937
- Died: 6 March 2017 (aged 79)
- Awards: Grahame Clark Medal for Prehistoric Archaeology

Academic background
- Education: University College of South Wales and Monmouthshire; Institute of Archaeology

Academic work
- Institutions: University of Baroda; Inspectorate of Ancient Monuments

Geoffrey John Wainwright, MBE, FSA, FRSA, FLSW (19 September 1937 – 6 March 2017) was a British archaeologist specialising in prehistory. He was the Chief Archaeologist of English Heritage from 1989 to 1999, and visiting professor to a number of universities. He served as president of the Prehistoric Society from 1981 to 1985 and the Society of Antiquaries of London from 2007 to 2010.

== Early life and education ==
Wainwright was born on 19 September 1937 in Angle, Pembrokeshire, Wales. He was educated at Pembroke Dock Grammar School. He studied archaeology at the University College of South Wales and Monmouthshire in Cardiff, and graduated with a first class Bachelor of Arts (BA) degree in 1958. He undertook postgraduate research in "the Mesolithic cultures of south-west Wales" at the Institute of Archaeology, University of London, completing his Doctor of Philosophy (PhD) degree in 1961.

== Career ==
From 1961 to 1963, Wainwright was professor of environmental archaeology at the University of Baroda in India. He then joined the Inspectorate of Ancient Monuments in what was to become English Heritage, serving as an inspector from 1963 to 1980, a principal inspector from 1980 to 1990, and as Chief Archaeologist from 1989 to 1999. He was a visiting professor at the University of Southampton from 1991, and was a visiting professor at the UCL Institute of Archaeology from 1995 to 2005.

Wainwright was involved in his first excavation as a university student: this was a Mesolithic settlement at Freshwater West, Pembrokeshire, Wales. In 1965, he excavated an entire Iron Age settlement in Tollard Royal, Wiltshire: unusually for the time, and with "consternation from traditional archaeologists", he used a JCB digger to clear the topsoil. He used the same technique at more Iron Age sites and also at some late Neolithic henges. In 1966, he excavated Durrington Walls, and he found two timber circles. In 1972, he excavated the Iron Age settlement at Gussage All Saints, Dorset.

== Later life ==
In retirement, Wainwright lived in Pontfaen, Pembrokeshire, Wales. He died at home on 6 March 2017, aged 79. His funeral was held on 20 March at the Parc Gwyn Crematorium in Narberth, Pembrokeshire.

== Personal life ==
Wainwright was first married to Sue Lukes and they had three children. Having divorced Sue, he married Judith Paton in 1977.

== Honours ==
In the 1991 New Year Honours, Wainwright was appointed Member of the Order of the British Empire (MBE) in recognition of his services as Principal Inspector of Ancient Monuments for English Heritage. In 2006, he was awarded the Grahame Clark Medal for Prehistoric Archaeology by the British Academy.

On 2 March 1967, he was elected Fellow of the Society of Antiquaries of London (FSA). In 2011, he was elected Fellow of the Learned Society of Wales (FLSW). He was also a Fellow of the Royal Society of Arts (FRSA).

== Selected works ==
- Wainwright, G. J.; Bowen, H. C. (1979). Gussage All Saints: an Iron Age settlement in Dorset. London: HMSO.
