= W. G. Clarke (writer) =

English journalist and archaeologist (1877–1925)

William George Clarke F. G. S.
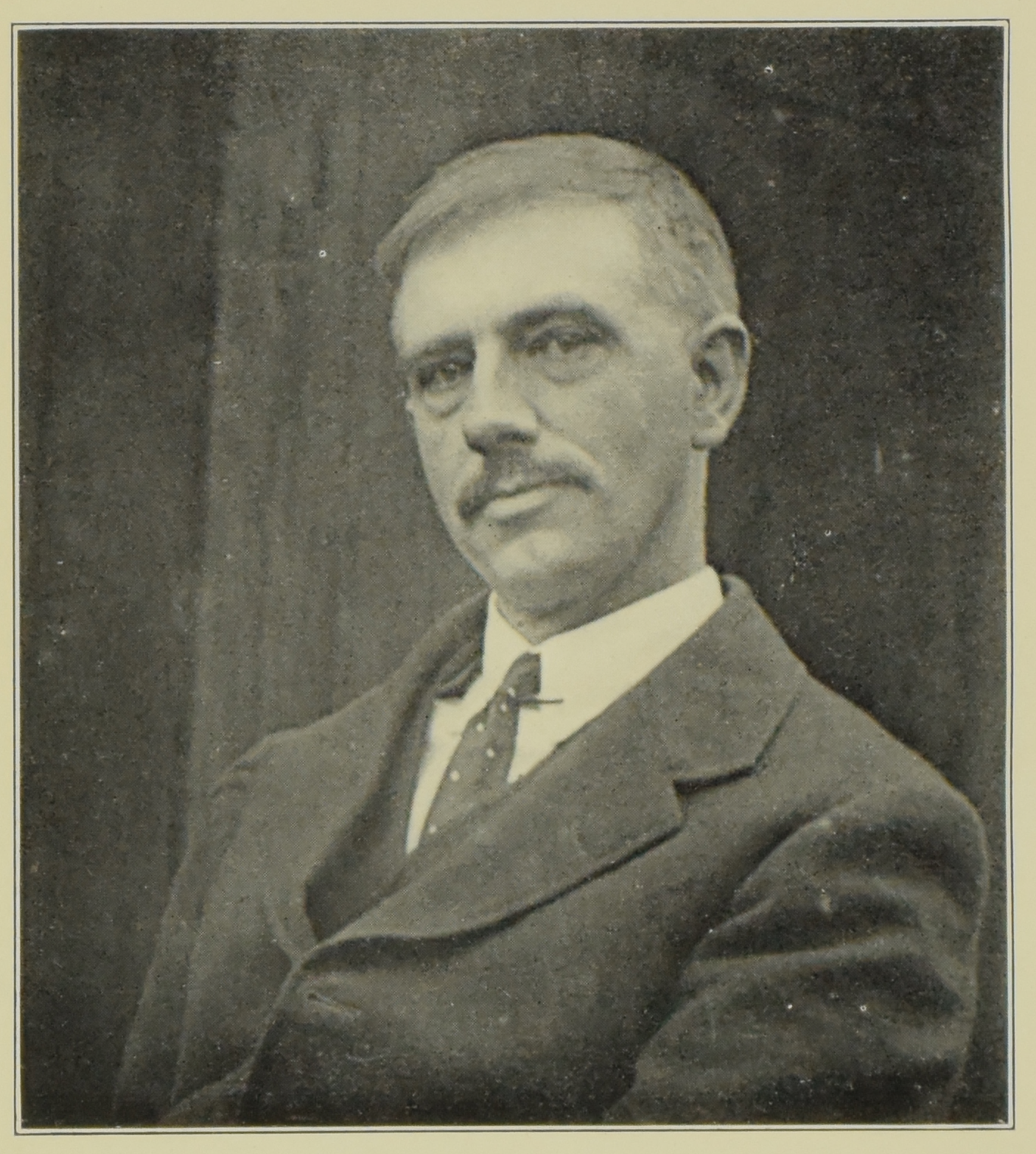
- Born: January 7, 1877; Stokeseley, Yorkshire
- Died: June 14, 1925 (aged 48); Norwich, Norfolk
- Occupations: Journalist, archaeologist, naturalist
- Employer: Eastern Daily Press
- Organization: The Prehistoric Society (founder)
- Notable work: In Breckland Wilds (1925)

William George Clarke (7 January 1877 – 14 June 1925) was an English journalist and a self-taught archaeologist and naturalist. He helped to found the Prehistoric Society of East Anglia, now the Prehistoric Society.

== Life ==
William George Clarke was born on 7 January 1877 in Stokesley, Yorkshire, the son of J. W. Clarke. The family moved to Thetford, Norfolk while Clarke was still young, where he attended Thetford Grammar School. While still at school, he began writing on nature and natural history, contributing articles to various papers and journals.

On leaving school, Clarke served an apprenticeship in his father's printing business, and took up employment in Bungay and London. He joined the staff of the Norwich Mercury in 1895, later becoming a sub-editor, and signing his articles "Wandering Will" and "W.G.C.".

During the First World War, Clarke served with the Norwich Cyclist Volunteers and later in the Army Pay Corps. After the war, Clarke was hired as sub-editor for the Norfolk News, and became a lead writer for the Eastern Daily Press, where he remained until his death on 14 June 1925.

Clarke was a member of many local societies and published a large number of articles on the natural history and archaeology of Norfolk, especially relating to Thetford and the Breckland area. He took a leading role in founding the Prehistoric Society of East Anglia, of which he was Honorary Secretary, and was President of the Norfolk and Norwich Naturalists' Society in 1917 (having been a member since 1894). Clarke was also an elected Fellow of the Royal Geological Society, and founded the Norwich Rambling Club. He was a co-opted member of both the Castle Museum and the Public Library Committees, and in the year of his death was elected to the committee of the Norfolk and Norwich Archaeological Society.

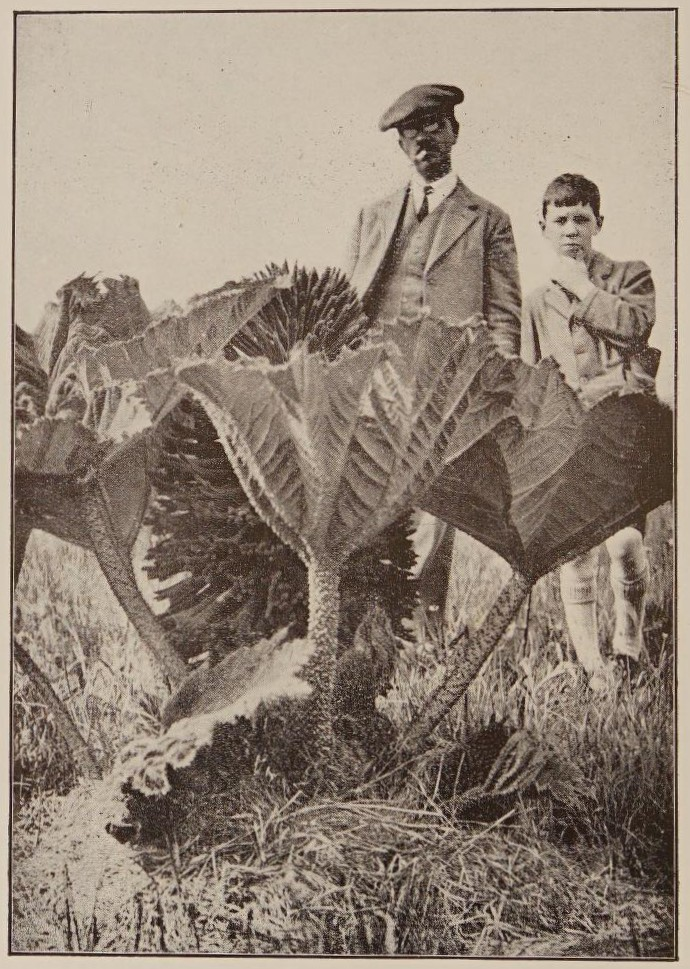
Photo of W. G. Clarke in In Breckland Wilds (1925)

In Breckland Wilds, a study of the nature and geography of Breckland, was published in 1925, after Clarke's death. Introducing the text in "An Appreciation", H. J. Massingham wrote:

Nobody can read this book without marvelling at the breadth and depth of his knowledge about that unique stretch of country in south-western East Anglia called the Brecks... This strange land Clarke knew off by heart and by head. There was nothing he didn’t know about it. Every insect, every bird, every mollusc, every flower, nearly every rabbit—he knew where they were, why they were there, how they lived, how many of them were there and how many there would be in the future. Fauna, flora, geology, rainfall, physical geography, archeology, village history, their knowledge streamed out of him, and every mortal thing that crept, grew, ran, lay or stood on the beloved heaths he walked with so springy a step he knew as well as though their area had been 400 inches instead of miles.

An obituary published in the Transactions of the Norfolk and Norwich Naturalists' Society, described Clarke as being "one of the deservedly best known all-round field naturalists in East Anglia". Papers and photographs belonging to W. G. Clarke are held by the Norfolk Record Office. Clarke's son, Roy Rainbird Clarke, also became an archaeologist.

== Bibliography ==
- Report on the Excavations at Grime's Graves. Weeting, Norfolk, March-May, 1914. London: H.K. Lewis (1915)
- Norfolk and Suffolk with paintings by A. Heaton Cooper. London: A & C Black (1921)
- Our homeland prehistoric antiquities and how to study them. The Homeland Pocket Books. London: The Homeland Association Ltd. (1922)
- In Breckland Wilds. London: Robert Scott (1925)
