= Susan Greaney =

British archaeologist

Susan Greaney FSA
- Born: Susan Westlake

Academic background
- Education: Cardiff University

Academic work
- Discipline: Archaeology
- Sub-discipline: Prehistory of Britain
- Institutions: English Heritage

Dr Susan Greaney FSA is a British archaeologist specialising in the study of British prehistory. Having carried out her PhD (funded by AHRC and completed at Cardiff and Southampton Universities) focussed on Neolithic monument complexes of Britain and Ireland, she is now a Lecturer in Archaeology at the University of Exeter.

Prior to joining the University of Exeter, Susan was a Senior Properties Historian with English Heritage.

Greaney earned a BA in Archaeology and Prehistory from University of Sheffield and a MSc in Professional Archaeology from University of Oxford. She carried out her PhD at Cardiff and Southampton Universities, looking at Neolithic monument complexes in Britain and Ireland.

Her current research focusses on monuments, landscapes, and societies of Neolithic and Early Bronze Age Britain and Ireland, with particular interest in radiocarbon chronologies and social inequalities.

In 2019, Greaney was appointed one of the BBC/AHRC New Generation Thinkers. She was elected as a Fellow of the Society of Antiquaries of London (FSA) on 27 June 2019, as well as being Fellow of the Higher Education Academy (FHEA), and a Member of the Chartered Institute for Archaeologists (MCIfA).

== Select publications ==
- Westlake, S. 2006. "Routeways and waterways: the Neolithic-Bronze Age rock carvings of the Dingle peninsula in south-west Ireland from a landscape perspective", Archaeological Journal 162, 1-30.
- Westlake, S. and Barnard, S. 2008. "Free sites unlocked: facing the challenges at free and unstaffed properties", Conservation Bulletin 58, 35.
- Westlake, S. 2009. "A pyramid in England: Silbury Hill, Wiltshire", Country Life 203(2), 40–42.
- Greaney, S. 2013. "Reconstruction drawings: illustrating the evidence", In Mills, N. Presenting the Romans: Interpreting the Frontiers of the Roman Empire World Heritage Site. Woodbridge: Boydell Press. 310–39.
- Greaney, S. 2013. Set in Stone: How our ancestors saw Stonehenge. London: English Heritage/Scala Publishing.
- Whittle, A., Pollard, J. and Greaney, S. 2023. Ancient DNA and the European Neolithic Relations and Descent. OxBow Books.
- Greaney, S. 2026. Stonehenge: The Story of an Icon. English Heritage.
