= Derrick Riley =

British archaeologist (1915–1993)

- Born: 15 August 1915; Matlock, Derbyshire
- Died: 22 August 1993 (aged 78)
- Scientific career
- Fields: Archaeology
- Institutions: University of Sheffield

Derrick Newton Riley DFC FSA (15 August 1915 – 22 August 1993) was a pioneer of aerial archaeology in Britain, an officer in the Royal Air Force and a manager in the steel industry.

== Early life and war service ==
Derrick Riley was born in Matlock in Derbyshire, and educated at King's School Ely and Haileybury College. In 1932 he became a management trainee in the steel industry. He was interested in archaeology and did six seasons of fieldwork in Lincolnshire before the outbreak of the second world war. At the outbreak of war, he joined the Royal Air Force and served in Bomber Command. He was promoted to the rank of Squadron Leader in 1944 and awarded the Distinguished Flying Cross in June 1944 for his part in a mine laying operation.

While flying over the Thames Valley and the Fens he took the opportunity to observe archaeology from the air, and this led to the publication of his first articles on aerial photography. His 1946 paper on The Technique of Air-Archaeology was recognised as founding the methodology of aerial archaeology.

After the war he returned to the steel industry and was a production manager for the British Steel Corporation in Stocksbridge until his early retirement in 1977.

== Aerial archaeology ==
After his return to the steel industry, he continued publishing articles on the archaeology of Yorkshire and Derbyshire, but it was not until 1975 that he took his private pilot's licence and started flying again. From 1979 to 1993 he was an honorary lecturer in aerial archaeology at Sheffield University where he set-up an MA course in aerial photography. He also published a book Early Landscape from the Air in 1980 which won the BBC Chronicle award in 1981. He worked in many countries apart from the United Kingdom: Germany, France, Italy, Jordan, Israel and the USA. He was an active member of the Hunter Archaeological Society and the Yorkshire Archaeological Society.

== Awards and honours ==
He was elected a Fellow of the Society of Antiquaries of London in 1959 and was also a member of the council of the society.

He was subsequently awarded an honorary doctorate from Sheffield University.

A festschrift, Into the sun: essays in air photography in archaeology in honour of Derrick Riley, was published in 1989.

== Personal life ==
He married Margaret Beckett in 1943 and had two children.

== Selected bibliography ==
- D N Riley (1942). "Crop marks from the upper Thames valley seen from the air during 1942". Oxoniensia. 7: 111–114.
- D N Riley (1943). "Archaeology from the air in the upper Thames valley". Oxoniensia. 8–9: 64–101.
- Riley, D. N. (1944). "The Technique of Air-Archaeology". Archaeological Journal. 101 (1): 1–16. doi:10.1080/00665983.1944.10853775. ISSN 0066-5983.
- Riley, F./Lt. D. N. (1945). "Aerial Reconnaissance of the Fen Basin". Antiquity. 19 (75): 145–153. doi:10.1017/S0003598X00022687.
- Riley, Derrick N.; Samuels, John (1980). Early landscape from the air: studies of crop marks in South Yorkshire and North Nottinghamshire. Sheffield: Dept. of Prehistory and Archaeology, Univ. ISBN 978-0-906090-05-3.
- Riley, D. N. (1982). Aerial archaeology in Britain. Shire archaeology. Aylesbury, Bucks, UK: Shire Publications. ISBN 978-0-85263-592-6.
- Riley, D. N. (1987). Air photography and archaeology. Philadelphia: University of Pennsylvania Press. ISBN 978-0-8122-8087-6.
- Riley, D. N. (1988). Yorkshire's past from the air. Sheffield: Sheffield Academic Press. ISBN 978-1-85075-130-4.
- Kennedy, D. L.; Riley, D. N. (1990). Rome's desert frontier from the air. London: Batsford. ISBN 978-0-203-48103-5.
