= Paul Mellars =

British archaeologist (1939–2022)

Sir Paul Mellars
- Born: 20 October 1939; Swallownest, Yorkshire, England
- Died: 7 May 2022 (aged 82); Hinchingbrooke, Cambridgeshire, England
- Spouse: Anny Mellars
- Awards: Grahame Clark Medal (2006); Knight Bachelor (2010)

Academic background
- Education: Fitzwilliam College, Cambridge

Academic work
- Discipline: Archaeology
- Sub-discipline: Prehistory; Mesolithic; Early European modern humans
- Institutions: University of Sheffield; Corpus Christi College, Cambridge

Sir Paul Anthony Mellars FBA FSA (29 October 1939 – 7 May 2022) was a British archaeologist and professor of prehistory and human evolution at the University of Cambridge.

== Early life and academic career ==
Paul Anthony Mellars was born on 29 October 1939 in the village of Swallownest, near Sheffield. His father, Herbert Mellars, was a miner and a member of the Plymouth Brethren. From the village school, he progressed to Woodhouse, a County Council Grammar School founded in 1909 in the West Riding of Yorkshire, which his mother Elaine (née Batty) had also attended. (Woodhouse has subsequently been incorporated into the newly built Aston Academy in Swallownest.) Mellars obtained his MA, PhD and ScD degrees at the University of Cambridge, where he was a student at Fitzwilliam College. He married his wife Anny in 1969, having first met in an archaeological field trip in the Dordogne in 1964.

After his PhD, Mellars taught for ten years in the Archaeology Department at Sheffield University before returning to Cambridge in 1980, where he became a fellow of Corpus Christi College. He briefly served as acting master of the college in 2007, following the resignation of Sir Alan Wilson, but six months later lost the election to become the formal successor to Wilson to Oliver Rackham. He has held visiting positions at the Binghamton University and the Australian National University.

He served as president of the Prehistoric Society. He was also a trustee of the ACE Foundation.

== Research ==
Mellars' later research concentrated on the behaviour and archaeology of Neanderthal populations in Europe, and their replacement by Homo sapiens 40,000 years ago. He contributed to the three-part BBC mini-series "Dawn of Man – The Story of Human Evolution" (2000).

He also studied the way in which mesolithic hunter-gatherer populations in Britain adapted to climate changes following the last ice age. He carried out excavations on early Mesolithic sites at Oronsay in the Inner Hebrides in Scotland and published the results from work at Star Carr in North Yorkshire.

== Death ==
Mellars died from cancer at Hinchingbrooke Hospital, near Huntingdon, Cambridgeshire, on 7 May 2022, aged 82.

== Honours ==
Mellars was elected a Fellow of the Society of Antiquaries (FSA) in 1977, a Fellow of the British Academy (FBA) in 1990 and a member of the Academia Europaea in 1999. In 2004, he was appointed an Officier of the Ordre des Palmes académiques by the French Government. In 2006, he was awarded the Grahame Clark Medal by the British Academy.

He was knighted in the 2010 New Year Honours for services to scholarship.

== Selected publications ==
- Mellars, Paul (2006). "Why did modern human populations disperse from Africa ca. 60,000 years ago?". Proceedings of the National Academy of Sciences. 103 (25): 9381–6. Bibcode:2006PNAS..103.9381M. doi:10.1073/pnas.0510792103. PMC 1480416. PMID 16772383.
- Mellars, Paul (2006). "Archeology and the Dispersal of Modern Humans in Europe: Deconstructing the "Aurignacian"" (PDF). Evolutionary Anthropology: Issues, News, and Reviews. 15 (5): 167–182. doi:10.1002/evan.20103. S2CID 85316570. Archived from the original (PDF) on 17 December 2008.
- Mellars, Paul; Dark, Petra (1998). Star Carr in Context: New Archaeological and Palaeoecological Investigations at the Early Mesolithic Site of Star Carr, North Yorkshire. McDonald Institute for Archaeological Research. ISBN 0-9519420-4-2.
- Mellars, Paul (1996). The Neanderthal Legacy. Princeton, N.J.: Princeton University Press. ISBN 0-691-03493-1.
- Mellars, Paul (1990). The Emergence of Modern Humans. Ithaca, N.Y.: Cornell University Press. ISBN 0-8014-2614-6.
- Mellars, Paul; Andrews, Martha V. (1987). Excavations on Oronsay: Prehistoric Human Ecology on a Small Island. Edinburgh University Press. ISBN 0-85224-544-0.
