= Marek Zvelebil =

Czech-Dutch archaeologist (1952–2011)

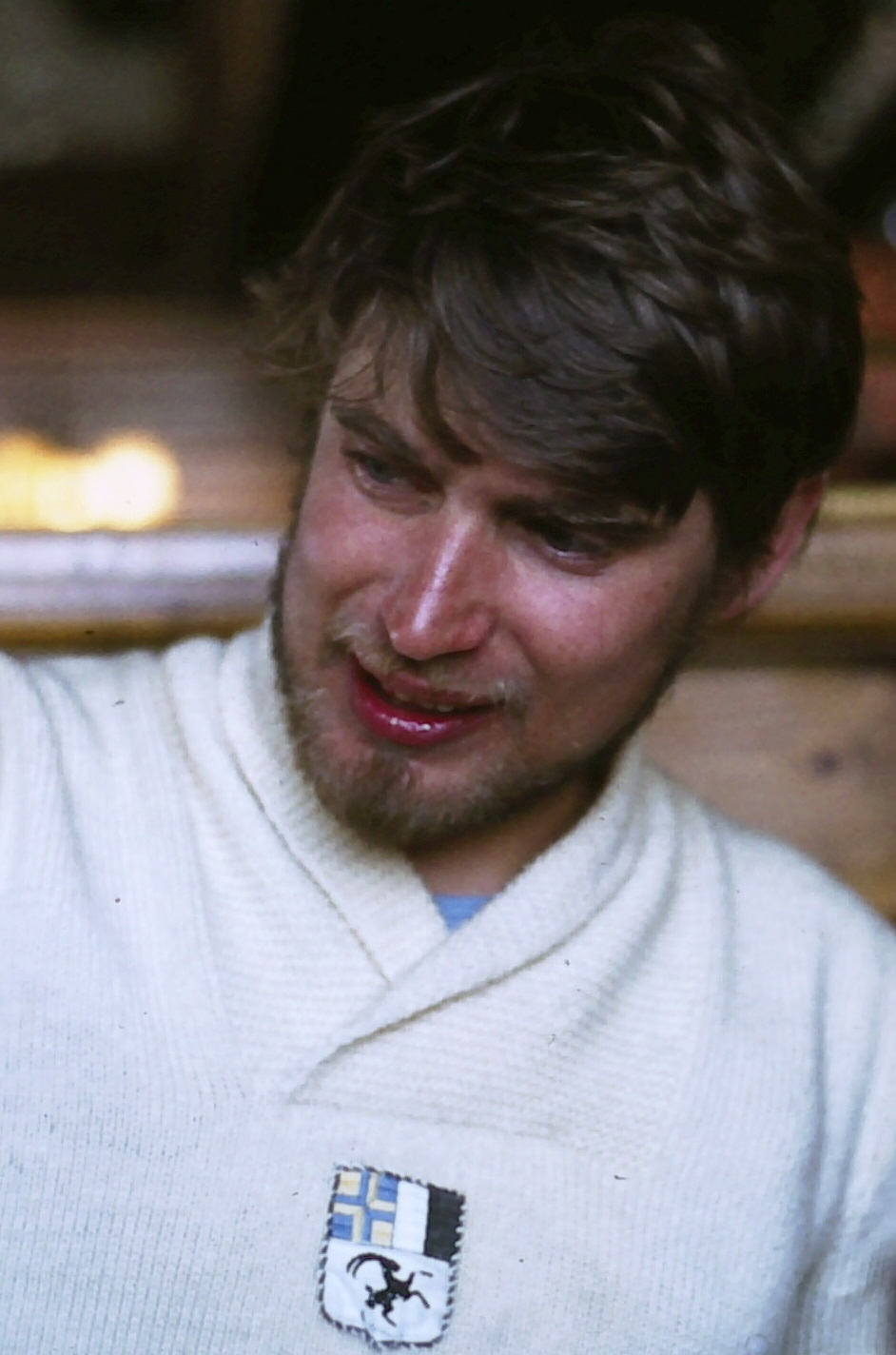
- Zvelebil in 1976
- Born: 9 January 1952; Prague, Czech Republic
- Died: 7 July 2011 (aged 59)
- Citizenship: Czech-Dutch
- Education: University of Sheffield; University of Cambridge (PhD)
- Occupation: Professor
- Employer: University of Sheffield
- Parent: Kamil Zvelebil

Marek Zvelebil, FSA (1952–2011) was a Czech-Dutch archaeologist and prehistorian.

== Biography ==
The son of Indologist Kamil Zvelebil, Zvelebil left his birth city of Prague with his family in 1968 following the Warsaw Pact invasion of Czechoslovakia. The family first lived in the United States before returning to Europe and settling in the Netherlands. Zvelebil however studied in Oxford, England, and went on to gain a BA in archaeology from the University of Sheffield and a PhD from the University of Cambridge, where he was one of the last students of Grahame Clark. Marek then taught at the University of South Carolina before returning to Sheffield in 1981 as a Research Fellow, later holding the positions of Lecturer, Senior Lecturer, Reader and finally Professor of European Prehistory. Overall he spent thirty years at Sheffield, with spells as a visiting professor at several institutions across Europe and North America.

Zvelebil's primary research interest was in the European Mesolithic and Mesolithic-Neolithic transition, particularly in the Baltic region. His PhD research was on the transition to farming in Finland and the eastern Baltic. Over the course of his career he wrote or edited more than a hundred scholarly works, including seminal papers such as Hunters in Transition (1986) and Plant Use in the Mesolithic and its role in the transition to farming (1994). The latter, published in the Proceedings of the Prehistoric Society was awarded the R. M. Baguley Prize. With the dissolution of the Soviet Union in 1991, Zvelebil was able to extend his research, looking at early farming cultures in eastern Europe and Siberian hunter-gatherer peoples. His field research included a co-directed major project in southeastern Ireland with Stanton Green and Claudia Green sponsored by the University of South Carolina and Monmouth University in coordination with Peter Woodman Professor of Archaeology at University College Cork, presented in a documentary film (Portalis: the first settlers of Ireland) and an exhibit at Waterford Treasures Museum. He also was a part of the Sheffield Department of Archaeology's long-running project in the Outer Hebrides.

Zvelebil died on 7 July 2011, at the age of 59.

== Selected bibliography ==
- Archaeology Yesterday and Today: The Development of Archaeology in the Sciences and Humanities by Zdenek Vasicek, Jaroslav Malina and Marek Zvelebil (Hardcover - 26 Oct 1990)
- Harvesting the Sea, Farming the Forest: Emergence of Neolithic Societies in the Baltic Region (Sheffield Archaeological Monographs) by Marek Zvelebil, R.W. Dennell and Lucyna Domanska (Hardcover - 1 May 1998)
- Hunters in Transition: Mesolithic Societies of Temperate Eurasia and their Transition to Farming (New Directions in Archaeology) by Marek Zvelebil (Paperback - 18 Jun 2009)
