= Melanie Giles =

British archaeologist

Melanie Giles FSA FBA
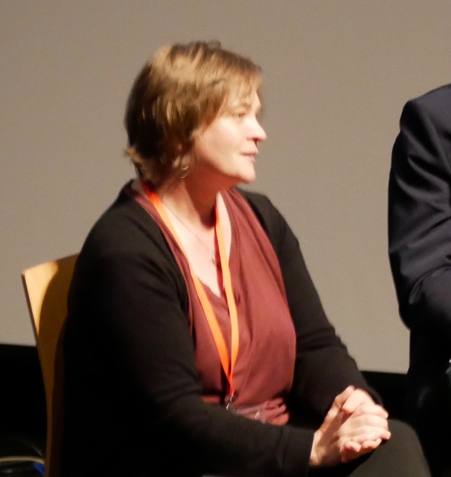
- Melanie Giles in a Panel Discussion
- Born: 21 April 1972 (age 54)
- Occupation: Archaeologist

Academic background
- Education: University of Sheffield
- Thesis: Open-weave, Close-knit: archaeologies of identity in the late prehistoric landscape of East Yorkshire (2000)

Academic work
- Institutions: University of Manchester

Melanie Giles FSA FBA (born 21 April 1972) is a British archaeologist and academic, specialising in Iron Age Britain. She is a Professor in European Prehistory at the University of Manchester.

== Early life and education ==
Giles was born on 21 April 1972 in Glossop, Derbyshire, England. She completed her Bachelor of Arts (BA) degree in archaeology and Master of Arts (MA) degree in landscape archaeology at the University of Sheffield. Her Doctor of Philosophy (PhD) degree, also undertaken at Sheffield, was supervised by Mike Parker Pearson and John Barrett. She investigated the Iron Age landscapes of East Yorkshire. The thesis was titled 'Open-weave, close-knit' : archaeologies of identity in the later prehistoric landscape of East Yorkshire.

== Career ==
Giles' initial research looked at British Iron Age communities, especially the square barrow burials of East Yorkshire, resulting in her major monograph A Forged Glamour. The book combined evidence for landscape management and mobility, aspects of community, power and personal biography, approached through the study of material culture including Iron Age mirrors, swords, shields and jewellery. The book was described as "a model of how big questions can be addressed by close attention to the archaeological data". More recent work has addressed disease and violence in Iron Age Britain, and their relationship with funerary behaviour and mortuary treatment. Giles is a member of the Bog Body network, and has undertaken research on Iron Age bog bodies. She has also undertaken the study of material culture, including the aesthetics of martial objects, and the symbolic aspects of ironworking technology. Giles has also undertaken research on industrial archaeology, including horse lads in East Yorkshire, and the Whitworth Park Community Archaeology and History Project.

Giles joined the University of Manchester after having taught at University College Dublin and the University of Leicester.

In 2016, Giles was elected as a Fellow of the Society of Antiquaries of London (FSA). In 2022, she was elected a Fellow of the British Academy (FBA), the United Kingdom's national academy for the humanities and social sciences. She was promoted to Professor in European Prehistory in January 2023.

== Selected publications ==
- (2007) Making metal and forging relations: Ironworking in the British Iron Age. Oxford Journal of Archaeology 26(4): 395-413.
- (2009) Iron Age bog bodies of north-western Europe. Representing the dead. Archaeological Dialogues 16(1): 75-101.
- (2012) A Forged Glamour: Landscape, Identity and Material Culture in the Iron Age. Oxford: Windgather Press.
- (2015) Performing pain, performing beauty: dealing with difficult death in the Iron Age. Cambridge Archaeological Journal 25(3): 539-550.
- (2020) Bog Bodies: face to face with the past. Manchester, Manchester University Press.
- Cooper, Anwen; Garrow, Duncan; Gibson, Catriona; Giles, Melanie; Wilkin, Neil (2022). Grave goods: objects and death in later prehistoric Britain. Oxford: Oxbow Books. ISBN 978-1789257472.
