= Chris Gosden =

British archaeologist

Chris Gosden FBA FSA FAHA
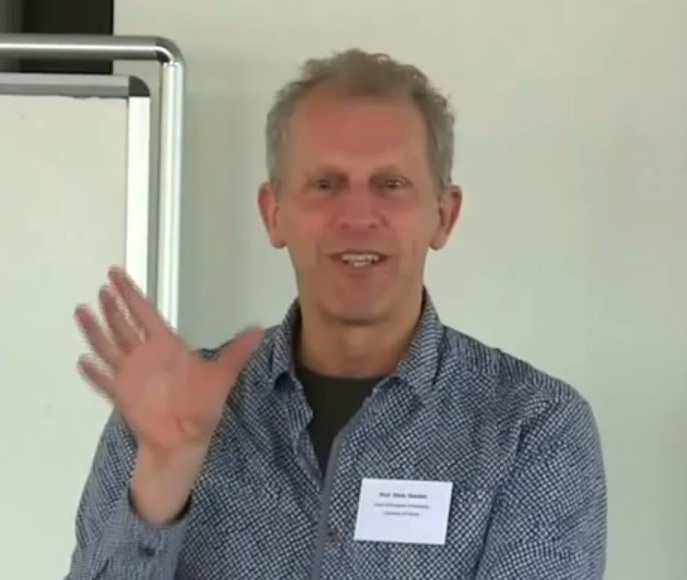
- Gosden in 2014
- Born: 6 September 1955 (age 71)
- Citizenship: United Kingdom and Australia

Academic background
- Education: University of Sheffield

Academic work
- Discipline: Archaeologist
- Sub-discipline: Prehistory; postcolonialism; museum studies; Celtic art; landscape archaeology
- Institutions: Australian National University; La Trobe University; Pitt Rivers Museum; St Cross College, Oxford; School of Archaeology, University of Oxford; Keble College, Oxford

Christopher Hugh Gosden FBA FAHA (born 6 September 1955) is a British and Australian archaeologist specialising in archaeological theory, especially theories of materials, the archaeology of colonialism, the archaeology of technology and magic, the archaeology of identity, particularly English identity. He is Emeritus Professor of European Archaeology and was Director of the Institute of Archaeology at the University of Oxford. He is also a trustee of the British Museum.

== Early life and education ==
Gosden was born on 6 September 1955. His biological mother was Jean Weddell (1928–2013), a physician, academic, and bell-ringer. She gave him up for adoption soon after birth, and he was subsequently adopted by Hugh and Margaret Gosden. The family emigrated to Australia, but later returned to the United Kingdom: he holds both Australian and British citizenship. He reconnected with his birth mother in 1987.

Gosden studied at the Department of Archaeology, University of Sheffield, graduating with a Bachelor of Arts (BA) degree in 1977 and a Doctor of Philosophy (PhD) degree in 1983.

== Academic career ==
From 1984 to 1985, Gosden was a visiting fellow and postdoctoral researcher at the Australian National University. He then moved to La Trobe University, where he had been appointed a lecturer in its Department of Archaeology in 1986. He had been promoted to senior lecturer by the time he left Australia in 1993.

In 1994, Gosden joined the University of Oxford as curator of the Pitt Rivers Museum and a university lecturer in archaeology. He was also a fellow of St Cross College, Oxford, from 1994 to 2006: he is now an Emeritus Fellow of the college. He was awarded a title of distinction as Professor of Archaeology in 2004, and served as head of the School of Archaeology between 2004 and 2006. He stepped down as Curator of the Pitt Rivers Museum in 2006, when he was appointed to the Chair of European Archaeology and elected a fellow of Keble College, Oxford.

In 2005, Gosden was elected a Fellow of the British Academy (FBA), the United Kingdom's national academy for the humanities and social sciences. In 2016, he was elected a Corresponding Fellow of the Australian Academy of the Humanities (FAHA).

He retired from Oxford in 2023 but is still working on various archaeological projects. He is the Principal Investigator for the ERC funded HORSEPOWER project in collaboration with the British Museum and colleagues at the Centre National de la Recherche Scientifique (CNRS) and, the Leibniz-Zentrum für Archäologie (LEIZA).

== Personal life ==
In 1992, Gosden married Jane Kaye. She is a legal scholar and Director of the Centre for Law, Health and Emerging Technologies at the University of Oxford. They have two children.

== Selected works ==
- Pollard, A. Mark and Gosden, Chris (2023). An Archaeological Perspective on the History of Technology. Cambridge: Cambridge University Press. ISBN 9781009184212.
- Gosden, Chris et al. (2021). English Landscapes and Identities. Investigating Landscape Change from 1500 BC to AD 1086. Oxford: Oxford University Press. ISBN 9780198870623.
- Gosden, Chris (2020). The History of Magic: From Alchemy to Witchcraft, from the Ice Age to the Present. New York: Farrar, Straus and Giroux. ISBN 978-0374717902.
- Gosden, Chris (2018). Prehistory: a very short introduction (2nd edition). Oxford: Oxford University Press. ISBN 9780198803515.
- Gosden, Chris (2003). Prehistory: a very short introduction. Oxford: Oxford University Press. ISBN 978-0192803436.
- Gosden, Chris (2004). Archaeology and colonialism: cultural contact from 5000 B.C. to the present. Cambridge: Cambridge University Press. ISBN 978-0521787956.
- Gosden, Chris; Larson, Frances (2007). Knowing things: exploring the collections at the Pitt Rivers Museum, 1884-1945. Oxford: Oxford University Press. ISBN 978-0199225897.
- Garrow, Duncan; Gosden, Chris (2012). Technologies of enchantment? Exploring Celtic art: 400 BC to AD 100. Oxford: Oxford University Press. ISBN 9780199548064.
