= Thornton Abbey =

Abbey in Thornton Curtis, Lincolnshire, England

Coordinates: 53.6550°N 0.3098°W

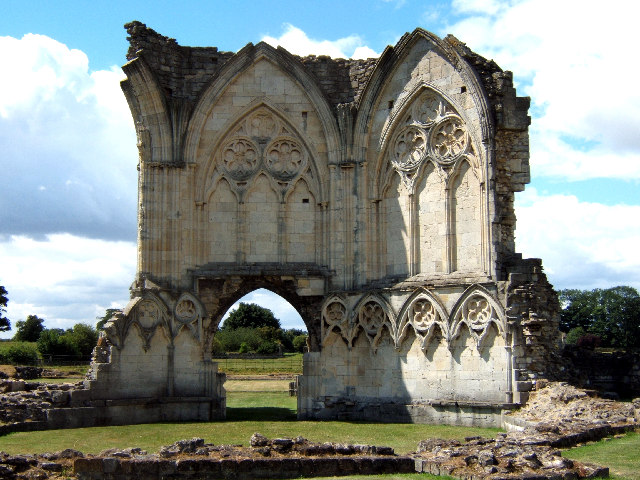
Ruins of the chapter house of Thornton Abbey

Thornton Abbey was a medieval abbey located close to the small North Lincolnshire village of Thornton Curtis, near Ulceby, and directly south of Hull on the other side of the Humber estuary. Its ruins are a Grade I listed building, including notably England's largest and most impressive surviving monastic gatehouse.

It was founded as a priory in 1139 by William le Gros, the Earl of Yorkshire, and raised to the status of abbey in 1148 by Pope Eugene III. It was a house for Augustinian or black canons, who lived a communal life under the Rule of St Augustine but also undertook pastoral duties outside the Abbey. Officers within the abbey included a cellarer, bursar, chamberlain, sacrist, kitchener and an infirmer. A medieval hospital also operated near the abbey, founded no later than 1322.

Due to its involvement in the area's burgeoning wool trade, Thornton was a wealthy and prestigious house, with a considerable annual income in 1534 of £591 0s 2¾d. The abbey was closed in 1539 by Henry VIII as part of the Dissolution of the Monasteries. It survived by becoming a Secular College, until Secular Colleges were also closed, in 1547.

Thornton Abbey railway station is nearby.

== Later history ==
Since the Dissolution of the Monasteries, the site has been owned by: Henry Randes (the Bishop of Lincoln); Sir Robert Tyrwhitt of Kettleby; Sir Vincent Skinner of Westminster (in 1602); Sir Robert Sutton; George Appleby; and in 1816 Charles, 1st Baron Yarborough.

In May 1859, members of the Lincoln Diocesan Architectural Society visited the site and were given a guided tour by the Rev. J. Byron of North Killingholme. A report of the tour, published by the Stamford Mercury, records that access to site had been restricted due to damage "by bands of modern Vandals". Brass effigies, some in place, others "strewed amongst the growing grass", and the entrance to a subterranean passageway were also observed.

In 1938, Sackville Pelham, 5th Earl of Yarborough handed the care of the abbey remains to the Office of Works. The site is currently in the care of English Heritage and open to the public. It is necessary to book a visit in advance, and the interior spaces are closed at present.

== Architecture ==
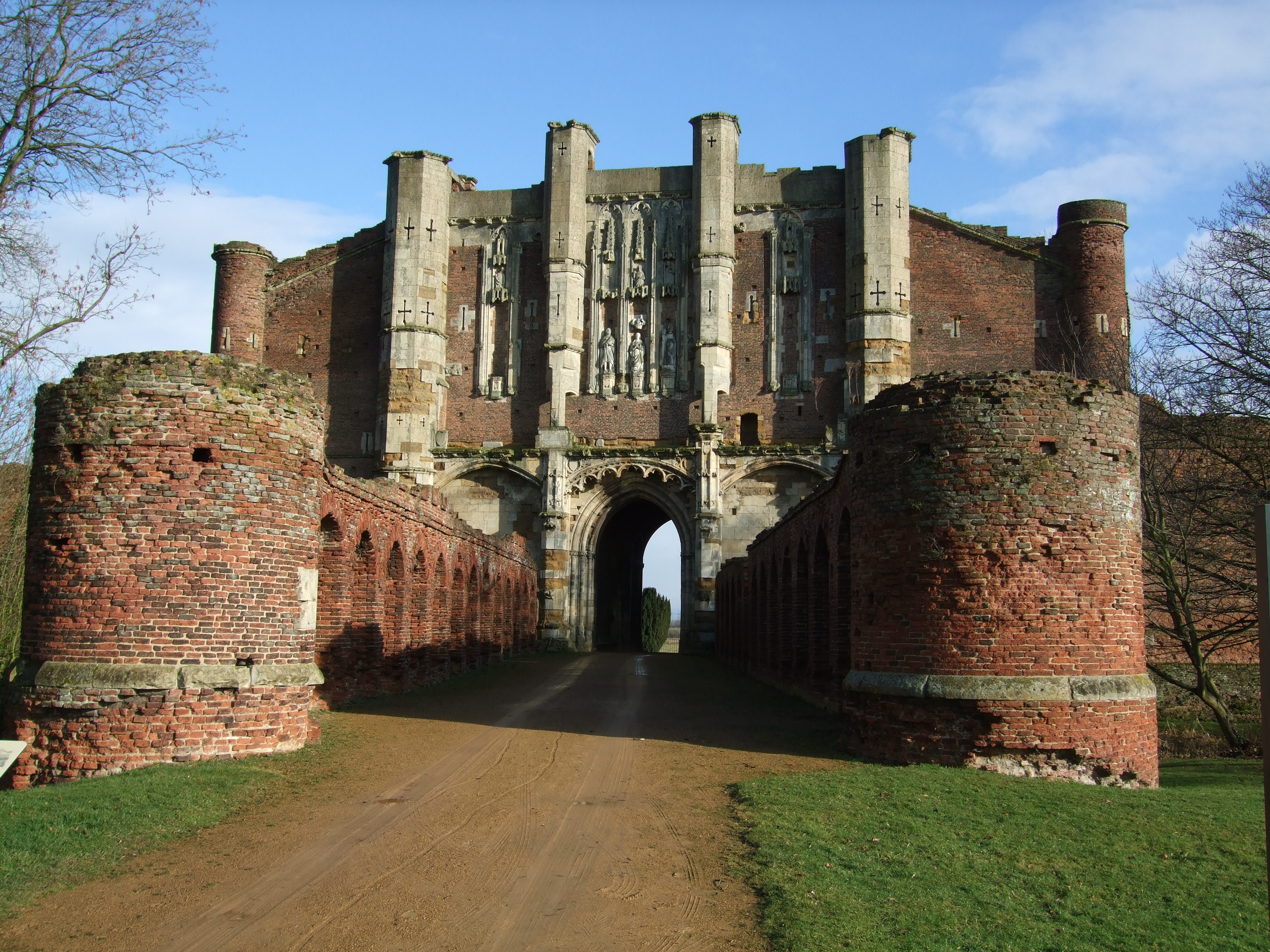
The gatehouse of Thornton Abbey from the outside

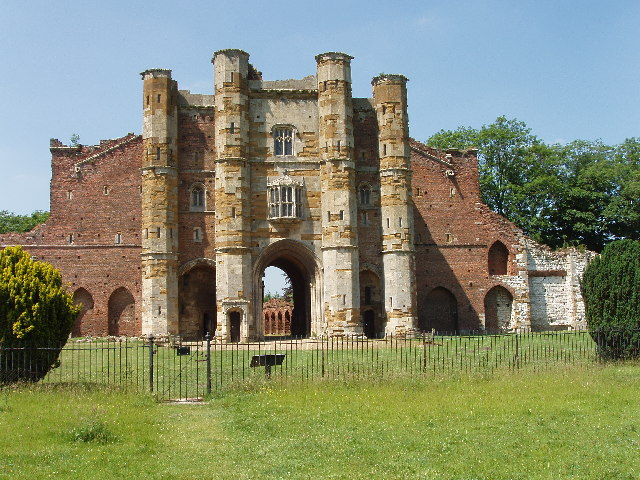
Gatehouse of Thornton Abbey from the inside

The founding abbey building from the 12th century was Romanesque in style, but nothing of it remains above ground. The later abbey from the 13th/14th centuries was built in Early Gothic style. Little remains of the building, except for three walls of the chapter house and part of the cloister, though the ground plan of the abbey is traced out.

The main interest lies in the gatehouse which is among the earliest large-scale uses of brick in England. It stands three storeys high and is structurally intact. There are few windows in the building, and the internal dimensions are cramped due to the thickness of the walls. The outside of the building is adorned with three almost life-size statues directly above the gate. A bridge over the moat adjoins the gatehouse and is fortified with walls and garderobes.

The nearby Abbot's Lodge is also a Grade I listed building. Elements of the ground floor of the monastic range of Thornton Abbey were converted to a house and the first floor rebuilt in the 17th century, reputedly by Sir Vincent Skinner, but the structure collapsed upon completion.

== Archaeology ==
Thornton Abbey was relatively under-examined for its size and importance, until English Heritage launched a programme of research beginning in 2007. This initial non-invasive research was followed by excavations performed by the University of Sheffield Department of Archaeology between 2011 and 2016, directed by Hugh Willmott.

In 2013, continuing excavation work uncovered a Black Death plague pit in the cemetery of the abbey's hospital, containing the remains of at least 48 individuals including the skeletons of 27 children. DNA was successfully extracted and tested positive for Yersinia pestis, the bacterium responsible for the plague, making this the first instance in Britain of a Black Death mass grave found in a rural, rather than urban, area. Willmott stated: "The finding of a previously unknown and completely unexpected mass burial dating to this period in a quiet corner of rural Lincolnshire is thus far unique, and sheds light into the real difficulties faced by a small community ill-prepared to face such a devastating threat."

== Burials at the abbey ==
- William le Gros, 1st Earl of Albemarle
- Aveline de Montfichet, wife of William de Forz, 3rd Earl of Albemarle
