= Maureen Carroll =

Professor of Roman Archaeology

Prof Maureen Carroll
- Born: 1953 (age 72–73)
- Occupation: Classical archaeologist

Academic work
- Institutions: University of York

Maureen Carroll (born 1953) FSA is a Canadian archaeologist and academic. She is the Chair in Roman Archaeology at the University of York.

== Career ==
Carroll received a BA in Classical Studies from Brock University and a MA in Classical Archaeology from Indiana University. Carroll received a PhD in Classical Archaeology from Indiana University and Freie Universität. Carroll was subsequently based at Cologne University and the Romisch-Germanisches Museum. In 1998 Carroll was appointed as a lecturer in Roman Archaeology at the University of Sheffield. In 2020, she was appointed Chair of Roman archaeology at the University of York.

Carroll has excavated in Italy, Germany, Britain, Cyprus and North Africa. Her excavations at Vagnari, southern Italy have discovered an imperial wine-making estate. She has spent several periods of research at the British School at Rome, as the Balsdon Fellow in 2007-8 and the Hugh Last Fellow 2015–16. Carroll has held the position of Visiting Professor of Classics at McMaster University.

Carroll's research has includes gender and dress in the Roman provinces, Greek and Roman gardens, Roman infancy and childhood and Roman death and burial. She has authored numerous monographs.

Her research has been funded by the Social Sciences and Humanities Research Council of Canada and the British Academy/Leverhulme Trust. Carroll was awarded a £1million grant from the Arts and Humanities Research Council in 2025 to undertake new research on the gypsum burial casts in Yorkshire, including creating 3D models of the impressions that allow new features to be seen for the first time.

== Awards and honours ==
Carroll was elected as a Fellow of the Society of Antiquaries in 2008.

== Selected publications ==
- Infancy and Earliest Childhood in the Roman World. ‘A Fragment of Time’. Oxford: Oxford University Press, 2018
- M. Carroll and E-J. Graham (eds.), Infant Health and Death in Roman Italy and Beyond (Journal of Roman Archaeology Supplementary Volume 96), Portsmouth, R.I., 2014
- Spirits of the Dead. Roman Funerary Commemoration in Western Europe (Oxford Studies in Ancient Documents). Oxford: Oxford University Press, 2006; paperback 2011
- Earthly Paradises. Ancient Gardens in History and Archaeology. London: British Museum Press, 2003
- Romans, Celts and Germans: The German Provinces of Rome. Stroud: Tempus, 2001
