= Little Carlton =

Village and civil parish in the East Lindsey district of Lincolnshire, England

Coordinates: 53.347642°N 0.099942°E

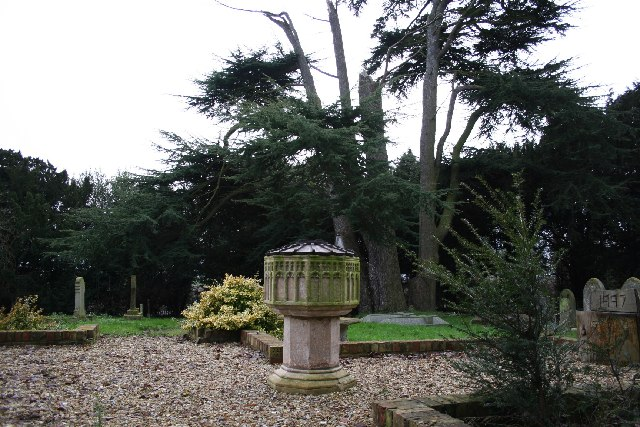
- Church of St Edith's churchyard, Little Carlton

- Location within Lincolnshire
- Population: 129 (2011)
- OS grid reference: TF398854
  - London: 130 mi (210 km) S
- District: East Lindsey
- Shire county: Lincolnshire
- Region: East Midlands
- Country: England
- Sovereign state: United Kingdom
- Post town: Louth
- Postcode district: LN11
- Police: Lincolnshire
- Fire: Lincolnshire
- Ambulance: East Midlands
- UK Parliament: Louth and Horncastle

Little Carlton is a village and civil parish in the East Lindsey district of Lincolnshire, England. It is situated approximately 6 miles (10 km) east from the town of Louth.

== History ==
=== Anglo-Saxon island settlement ===
An Anglo-Saxon settlement originally on an marshland island dating to the 7th-century was discovered in the village after a local metal detectorist found a wide range of metal artefacts including twenty styli, coins, pins and trade weights and a lead tablet engraved with the female Anglo-Saxon name 'Cudberg'. An excavation by Dr Hugh Willmott from the archaeology department of Sheffield University found a 7th-century cemetery, timbered buildings as well as, high status ceramics and glass, as well as further ecclesiastical metal objects. Dr Hugh Willmott from the university said the finds suggest the settlement was a "high-status ecclesiastical and trading site and not an ordinary village".

=== St Edith's Church ===
The church was dedicated to St Edith and was largely rebuilt in 1837. It was declared redundant by the Diocese of Lincoln in 1981 and closed. Despite it being Grade II listed in 1986, it was demolished in 1993. Excavation work and a survey were carried out during the demolition, during which a number of blocked doorways and windows were identified. Part of a late 10th-century or early 11th-century grave cover was used as rubble-fill in the south wall of the nave between the two main windows.

=== Windmill and Watermill ===
Little Carlton had a windmill and watermill. The watermill was built in 1820 by J. Saunderson, engineer of Louth, for Joseph Bond. It last worked in 1847 and is Grade II listed. Most of the machinery is missing.
