= Live Science =

Science news website

- Logo of the website since 2016

- Screenshot of the website in December 2024
- Website type: News website
- Available in: English
- Owner: Future
- Editor: Alexander McNamara
- Website: www.livescience.com
- Commercial: Yes
- Launched: 2004; 22 years ago

Live Science is a science news website. The publication features stories on a wide range of topics, including space, animals, health, archaeology, human behavior, and planet Earth. It also includes a reference section with links to other websites. Its stated mission is to inform and entertain readers about science and the world around them.

== History ==
Live Science was originally made in 2004. It was acquired by TechMediaNetwork, later called Purch, in 2009. Purch consumer brands (including Live Science) were acquired by Future in 2018.

== Reception ==
In 2011, the Columbia Journalism Review's "News Startups Guide" called Live Science "a purebred Web animal, primarily featuring one-off stories and photo galleries produced at high speed by its mostly young staffers, almost all of whom have journalism degrees," noting that, "If you are looking for resource-intensive expositions of global warming, for instance, or thickly narrated journeys into the research process, LiveScience [sic] will disappoint. The site carries the big science news of the day, but its strength lies in the quirky diversity of its other content–oddball studies overlooked by major news organizations."

== Awards ==
2007: Winner - Specialty Site Journalism, Large from the Online Journalism Awards.

2008, 2010: Honoree - Websites and Mobile Sites, Science from the Webby Awards.

2021: Listed as one of the top 10 science websites from the website "Make Use Of".

Live Science was ranked in RealClearScience's "Top 10 Websites for Science" from 2016 to 2023.
