= The Prehistoric Society =

British learned society

Proceedings of the Prehistoric Society
- Discipline: Archaeology
- Language: English

Publication details
- Former name: Proceedings of the Prehistoric Society of East Anglia
- History: 1911–present
- Publisher: The Prehistoric Society

Standard abbreviations
- ISO 4: Proc. Prehist. Soc.

Indexing
- ISSN: 2050-2729 (print); 2050-2729 (web)
- Proceedings of the Prehistoric Society of East Anglia
- ISSN: 0958-8418

Links
- Journal homepage

The Prehistoric Society is a British learned society devoted to the study of the human past from the earliest times until the emergence of written history.

Now based at University College London in the United Kingdom, it was founded by V. Gordon Childe, Stuart Piggott and Grahame Clark in 1935 but also traces its founding to the earlier Prehistoric Society of East Anglia which began in 1908. The society is a registered charity under English law.

Membership is by subscription and includes the annual journal, Proceedings of the Prehistoric Society, which continues Proceedings of the Prehistoric Society of East Anglia (1911-1934), and bulletins from the newsletter, PAST, which is published in April, July and November. It also organises regular conferences, lectures and other events and makes grants for archaeological research.

== Awards ==
The Prehistoric Society gives out a number of annual grants and awards, including the Baguley Award for the best contribution to that year's Proceedings. The Baguley Award is named in honour of Rodney M. Baguley and was inaugurated in 1979.

== Notable People Associated with the Society ==
- Aileen Fox
- Alison Sheridan
- Andrew Selkirk
- Barbara S. Ottaway
- Clive Ruggles
- Edward Clodd
- Geoffrey Wainwright
- Gertrude Caton Thompson
- Grahame Clark
- Jane Renfrew
- John Amyas Alexander
- Kurt Bittel
- Leslie Grinsell
- Leslie R. H. Willis
- Michael J. O'Kelly
- Mike Parker Pearson
- Miranda Aldhouse-Green
- Nicole Boivin
- Nina Frances Layard
- O. G. S. Crawford
- Paul Mellars
- Peggy Guido
- Peter Woodman
- Ralegh Radford
- Stuart Piggott
- V. Gordon Childe
- W. G. Clarke (writer)
