= Najara family =

Najara (Najar, Nijar, Nagar, Nagara, Hebrew: נאג'ארה) is the name of a Sephardic Jewish family, originally from Nájera, Spain. Nájera is on the River Najerilla. Now in La Rioja, at one time it was the capital of kingdom of Navarre.

In the history of rabbinical literature, Najaras are found at Algeria, Tunis, Damascus, Turkey aside from other places. Notable people with this family name include:

- David Najar
- Gonzalo Najar
- Israel ben Moses Najara
- Judah ben Jacob Najar
- Levi Najara
- Maimun Najar
- Mordecai Najar
- Moses Najara I
- Moses Najara II
- Nathan Najar
