= Israel ben Moses Najara =

Jewish poet, preacher, biblical commentator, and rabbi (c. 1555–c. 1625)

- יִשְׂרָאֵל בֵּן מֹשֶׁה נַאגָּ֗ארָה إسرائيل بن موسى النجارة

Personal life
- Born: c. 1555 Damascus, Damascus Eyalet, Ottoman Empire
- Died: c. 1625 (aged 69–70) Gaza, Damascus Eyalet, Ottoman Empire
- Children: Moses Najara II
- Parent: Moshe ben Levi Najara (father)
- Notable works: Zemirot Yisrael; Mesaḥeḳet ha-Tebel; Shoḥaṭe ha-Yeladim; Ketubbat Yisrael
- Occupation: Poet; preacher; Biblical commentator; kabbalist; rabbi

Religious life
- Religion: Judaism

Israel ben Moses Najara (Hebrew: יִשְׂרָאֵל בֵּן מֹשֶׁה נַאגָּ֗ארָה, romanized: Yiśrāʾēl bēn Mōše Najjārāh; Arabic: إسرائيل بن موسى النجارة, romanized: ʾIsrāʾīl bin Mūsā n-Najāra; c. 1555 – c. 1625) was a prolific Jewish liturgical poet, preacher, Biblical commentator, kabbalist (although this is disputed), and rabbi in Gaza.

== Biography ==
The rabbinic Najara family was originally from Nájera, a Spanish city in Northern Spain on the Najerilla river. Nájera was the former capital of the Kingdom of Navarre and in the 11th century it was incorporated into the Kingdom of Castile. In the rabbinical literature of the 16th-19th centuries, Najaras are found in Algiers, Tunis, Damascus, and Gaza.

It is believed that Najara's grandfather, rabbi Levi Najara, was born in Spain and fled to Damascus due to the 1492 expulsion of the Jews from Spain. His father, rabbi Moshe ben Levi Najara, was born in Salonica, Greece, and in his later years moved with his family to Safed and was involved with the kabbalistic circles of the Arizal. Rabbi Israel Najara was born in Damascus around 1555. He lived most of his life between Safed, Damascus, and Gaza. Many details of his life can be inferred from his poetry.

After an attack on the Jews of Safed by an Arab tribe in 1579, Najara left with his family and settled in Jobar on the outskirts of Damascus, where he served as a sofer and rabbi. He experienced unusual personal tragedy; his first wife died at a young age, and his only daughter from this marriage died at the age of ten. He eventually remarried, and some of the children from his second marriage survived into adulthood. In his later years, he was a rabbi in Gaza, where he is buried. One of his sons, Moses Najara, was also a poet, and succeeded his father as the chief rabbi of Gaza. His grandson Yaakov Najara was embroiled in the Sabbatean controversy.

From his secular poems, which he wrote in the meters of various Ladino, Turkish, and Greek songs, it is evident that he was familiar with several foreign languages. He traveled extensively in the Ottoman Empire; there is evidence that he visited Salonica, Istanbul and Bursa. Due to his upbringing in Safed, he came under the extensive influence of Lurianic Kabbalah.

As may be seen from his works, he was a versatile scholar, and he corresponded with many contemporary rabbis, among others with Bezaleel Ashkenazi, Yom-Ṭob Ẓahalon, Moses Hamon, and Menahem Ḥefeẓ. His poetic effusions were exceptionally numerous, and many of them were translated into Persian. While still young he composed many hymns, to Arabic and Turkish tunes, with the intention, as he says in the preface to his Zemirot Yisrael, of turning the Jewish youth from profane songs. He wrote piyyuṭim, pizmonim, seliḥot, vidduyim, and dirges for all the week-days and for Sabbaths, holy days, and occasional ceremonies, these piyyuṭim being collected in his Zemirot Yisrael. Many of the piyyuṭim are in Aramaic.

== Works ==
Najara's letters, secular poems, epigrams, and rhymed prose form the work entitled Meimei Yisrael (מימי ישראל) are published at the end of the second edition of the Zemirot Yisrael (זמירות ישראל). Najara's other works are as follows:

- Mesaḥeḳet ha-Tebel (Safed, 1587), an ethical poem on the nothingness of the world;
- Shoḥaṭe ha-Yeladim (printed with Moses Ventura's Yemin Mosheh, Amsterdam, 1718), Hebrew verse on the laws of slaughtering and porging, composed at the request of his son Moses;
- Ketubbat Yisrael (with Joseph Jaabez's Ma'amar ha-Aḥdut, n.p., 1794), a hymn which, in the kabalistic fashion, represents the relationship between God and Israel as one between man and wife (it was composed for the holiday of Shavuot);
- A collection of hymns published by M. H. Friedländer (Vienna, 1858) under the title Pizmonim.

His unpublished works are:

- She'erit Yisrael, containing sixty poems, which is, according to its heading, the second part of Zemirot Yisrael; it is found in the bet ha-midrash of the Yekke community in Amsterdam; from it Leopold Dukes published one poem;
- Ma'arkhot Yisrael, a commentary on the Torah;
- Miḳveh Yisrael, sermons
- Piẓ'ei Ohev, a commentary on the Book of Job.

M. Sachs attempted to render some of Najara's piyyuṭim into German.

After the ruins of the house inhabited by Judah he-Ḥasid of Jerusalem were cleared away in 1836, some writings of Israel Najara from the year 1579 were found.

=== Zemirot Yisrael ===
Zemirot Yisrael, originally entitled Zemirot Yisrael Najara, was first published at Safed (1587) and contained 108 piyyuṭim and hymns. Many additional songs were printed in the Venetian edition from 1599. This edition contains the Meme Yisrael and the Mesaḥeḳet ha-Tebel additions, and is divided into three parts:

1. Olat Tamid (עולת תמיד), containing 225 piyyuṭim organized according to the Ottoman makam system. He notes twelve makamlar: Rast, Dugah, Huseyni, Bûselik, Segâh, Segâh Irak, Nebrus Acem, Mahur, Neva Uzzal, Naks Huseyni, and Nikriz;
2. Olat Shabbat (עולת שבת), containing 54 piyyuṭim for each Shabbat of the year (set to presumably well known melodies of other piyyutim, as indicated in the incipits);
3. Olat Ḥodesh (עולת חודש), containing 160 piyyuṭim and dirges for the High Holy Days, Purim, the Ninth of Ab, and occasional ceremonies. These include epic poems recounting the Hanukkah and Purim stories, as well as the piyyuṭ sung by Sephardic communities on Shavuot ירד דודי לגנו לערוגות בשמו (also known as the ketubbah shel matan Torah) describing an allegorical "marriage contract" between God and Israel. It was published a third time at Belgrade (1837), but with the omission of many songs and of the two works just mentioned. Extracts from the Zemirot Yisrael were published under the title of Tefillot Nora'ot (Frankfort-on-the-Main, 1712).

=== Influence ===
Many of Najara's piyyuṭim and hymns have been taken into the rituals and maḥzorim in use among the Jews in different countries, especially in Italy and Israel.

The poetic works of Rabbi Israel Najara had considerable influence on the various baqashot traditions of Morocco, Turkey (also known as the maftirim tradition), and Syria. At least 26 compositions by Najara are part of the Moroccan baqashot canon, and roughly 8 of the 66 Syrian baqashot were composed by Najara (יאמר נא ישראל, ימותי כלו כצבאות, אנא הושע מאור עיני, אשיר עז, יודוך רעיוני, יה אלה מלכות, יה רבון עלם, יוםליום אודה). On Shabbat eve, the Jews of Aleppo sing many hymns and prayers written by Najara.

The best known of his hymns are Yah Ribbon 'Alam (יה רבון עלם) recited on the Sabbath by the Jews of various countries, as well as Yodukha Ra'ayonay (יודוך רעיוני) and Yarhiq Nedod (ירחיק נדוד).

== Critical reception ==
For some of his poetic innovations – for example his hymns on the marriage of God and Israel – Najara was severely criticized by Menahem Lonzano when the latter was in Damascus.

The Shibḥei Ḥayyim Viṭal contains a violent attack (accusations included: use of foul language, being a drunkard, homosexuality, and sexual relations with non-Jewish women) by Hayyim Vital upon a poet whose name is not mentioned, but whom some take to be Israel Najara. (It was later discovered that Vital actually had named Najara, but this had been censored out until the 1954 publication of Sefer HaḤezyonot based on Vital's own autograph manuscript.) However, Vital did not make these accusations based on observation, but rather based on mystical revelations which he claimed to have received from a spirit. Despite the accusations, Isaac Luria, Vital's teacher, declared that Najara's hymns were listened to with delight in heaven. Najara's piyyuṭim were praised also by Leon of Modena, who composed a song in his honor, which was printed at the beginning of the Olat Shabbat, the second part of the Zemirot Yisrael.

== Bibliography ==
- Chaim Azulai, Shem ha-Gedolim, ii, s.v. Zemirot Yisrael;
- Simon Bernfeld, in Ha-Asif, iv, section 4, pp. 18 et seq.;
- David Conforte, Ḳore ha-Dorot, pp. 37a, 41a, 49b;
- Dukes, Zur Kenntniss, pp. 9, 138, No. 8;
- Fuenn, Keneset Yisrael, p. 699;
- Julius Fürst, Bibl. Jud. iii.12;
- Heinrich Grätz, Gesch., 3rd ed., ix.395;
- Landshuth, 'Ammude ha-'Abodah, pp. 135 et seq.;
- Orient. Lit. iv.649 et seq.;
- Moritz Steinschneider, Cat. Bodl. cols. 1170–1171;
- idem, Jewish Literature, pp. 155, 243;
- Zunz, Literaturgesch. p. 419.
