= Gary Lock =

British archaeologist

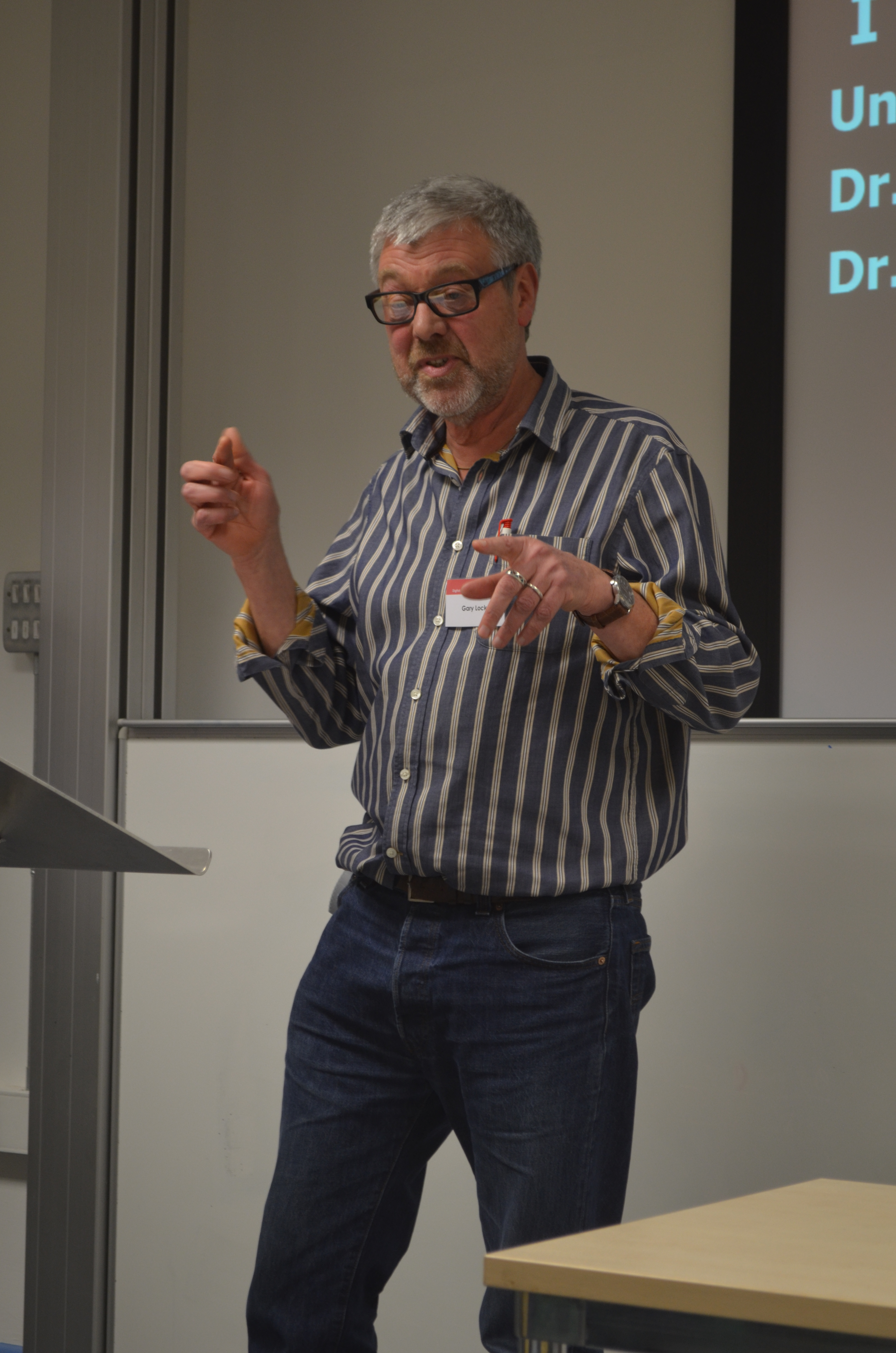
Professor Gary Lock in 2012

Gary R. Lock is a British archaeologist and emeritus professor at the School of Archaeology, University of Oxford. He is noted for his contributions to computational archaeology.

== Work in the UK ==
In the 1980s Lock became involved in computational archaeology, working on a database for Danebury, an iron age hillfort in Hampshire which was excavated under the direction of Barry Cunliffe. In 1987 he was co-author of Computer Archaeology in the Shire Archaeology series. Interest in computational archaeology and prehistoric hillforts are also evidenced in more recent work, for example Using computers in archaeology: towards virtual pasts (2003) and his contribution to a project to create a comprehensive database of prehistoric hillforts in the British Isles, the Atlas of Hillforts of Britain and Ireland (launched online in 2017).

Lock has been a fellow of Kellogg College since 1993, serving as the secretary to its governing body from 1997 to 1998 and Dean of Degrees in 2010.

== Work abroad ==
He was formerly the chair of Computer Applications and Quantitative Applications in Archaeology (CAA) International.

He has been involved with archaeological projects on the continent:

- Najarilla valley, Spain
- Sangro Valley Project, Italy. Together with John Lloyd, he initiated this longue durée project in 1994.

== Selected publications ==
- Lock, Gary R.; Stančič, Zoran (1995). Archaeology and Geographical Information Systems: A European Perspective. London: Taylor & Francis. ISBN 0-7484-0208-X. OCLC 33664879.
- Lock, Gary R. (2000). Beyond the Map: Archaeology and Spatial Technologies. Amsterdam: IOS Press. ISBN 1-58603-021-3. OCLC 45238404.
- Lock, Gary R.; Brown, Kayt, eds. (2000). On the Theory and Practice of Archaeological Computing. Oxford: Oxford University Committee for Archaeology. ISBN 0-947816-51-8. OCLC 44835799.
- Lock, Gary R. (2003). Using computers in archaeology: towards virtual pasts. London: Routledge. ISBN 0-203-45107-4. OCLC 53886853.
- Miles, David; Palmer, Simon; Lock, Gary; Gosden, Chris; Cromarty, A. M., eds. (2003). The Uffington White Horse and its Landscape: Investigations at White Horse Hill, Uffington, 1989-95, and Tower Hill, Ashbury, 1993-4. Oxford: Oxford Archaeology. ISBN 0-947816-77-1. OCLC 53411610.
- Lock, Gary R.; Gosden, Chris; Daly, Patrick (2005). Segsbury Camp: Excavations in 1996 and 1997 at an Iron Age hillfort on the Oxfordshire Ridgeway. Oxford: Oxford University School of Archaeology. ISBN 0-947816-68-2. OCLC 62674064.
- Fletcher, Mike; Lock, Gary (1991). Digging Numbers: Elementary Statistics for Archaeologists (2nd ed.). Oxford: Oxford University Committee for Archaeology. ISBN 0-947816-33-X. OCLC 30436044.
- Lock, Gary; Molyneaux, Brian, eds. (2006). Confronting Scale in Archaeology: Issues of Theory and Practice. Springer. doi:10.1007/0-387-32773-8. ISBN 978-0-387-32772-3.
- Lloyd, John Alfred; Lock, Gary R., eds. (2008). Archaeology and landscape in central Italy: papers in memory of John A. Lloyd. Oxford: Oxford University School of Archaeology. ISBN 978-1-905905-06-5. OCLC 212430814.
- Cunliffe, Barry W.; Lock, Gary R. (2010). A valley in La Rioja: the Najerilla project. Oxford: Oxford University School of Archaeology. ISBN 978-1-905905-15-7. OCLC 609701372.
- Lock, Gary; Spicer, R. D.; Hollins, W. (2014). Excavations at King's Low and Queen's Low: two Early Bronze Age barrows in Tixall, north Staffordshire. Oxford: Archaeopress. ISBN 978-1-905739-66-0. OCLC 1118193587.
- Gosden, Chris; Lock, Gary (2013). Histories in the making: excavations at Alfred's Castle 1998-2000. Oxford: Oxford University School of Archaeology. ISBN 978-1-905905-32-4. OCLC 871193039.
