= Barry Cunliffe =

English archaeologist (born 1939)

Sir Barry Cunliffe CBE FBA FSA
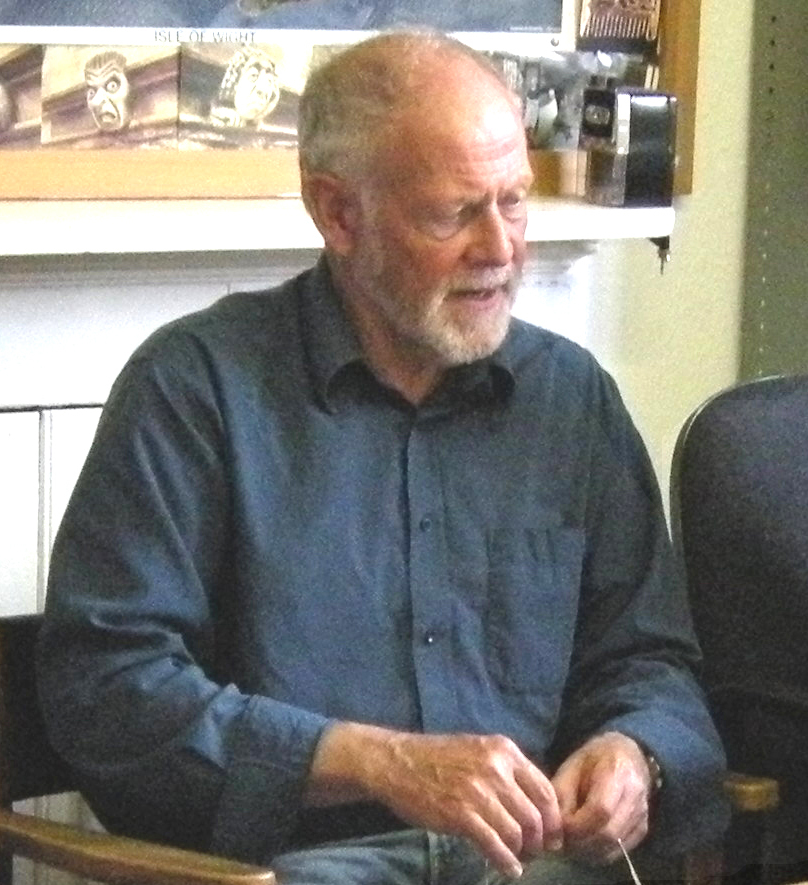
- Cunliffe in 2008
- Born: Barrington Windsor Cunliffe; 10 December 1939 (age 86)

Academic background
- Education: St John's College, Cambridge

Academic work
- Discipline: Archaeologist
- Sub-discipline: Prehistoric Europe; Roman Britain; Iron Age Europe
- Institutions: University of Bristol; University of Southampton; University of Oxford

Sir Barrington Windsor Cunliffe (born 10 December 1939), usually known as Sir Barry Cunliffe, is a British archaeologist and academic. He was Professor of European Archaeology at the University of Oxford from 1972 to 2007. Since 2007, he has been an emeritus professor.

== Biography ==
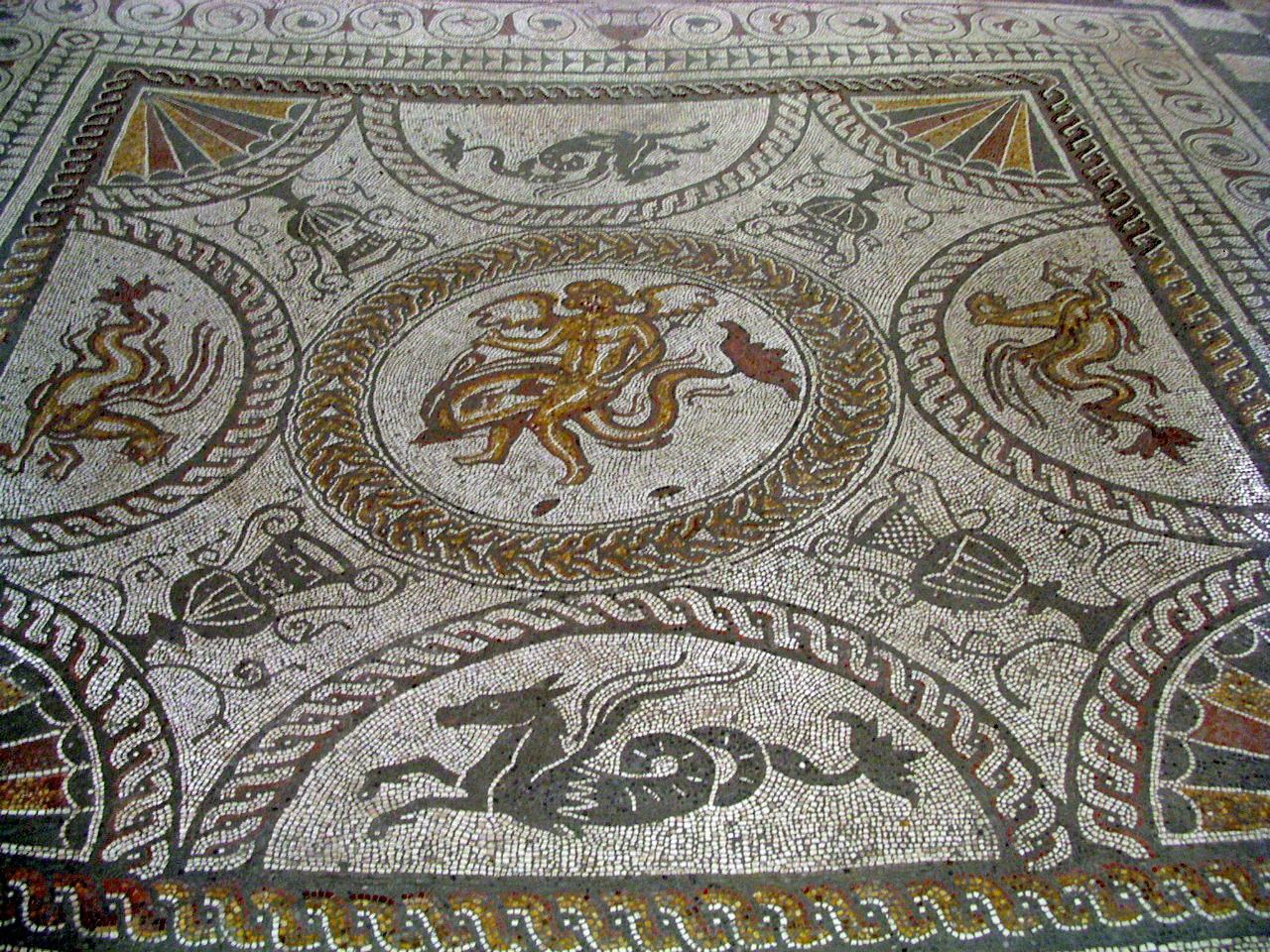
The dolphin mosaic found by Cunliffe's team at Fishbourne Roman Palace in West Sussex

Cunliffe's decision to become an archaeologist was sparked at the age of nine by the discovery of Roman remains on his uncle's farm in Somerset. Cunliffe studied at Portsmouth Northern Grammar School (now the Mayfield School) and read archaeology and anthropology at St John's College, Cambridge. While a student at the University of Cambridge, he ran and won an election against his course mate and fellow Johnian Colin Renfrew in order to become president of the University of Cambridge Archaeological Field Club (AFC). He became a lecturer at the University of Bristol in 1963. Fascinated by the Roman remains in nearby Bath he embarked on a programme of excavation and publication.

In 1966, he became an unusually young professor when he took the chair at the newly founded Department of Archaeology at the University of Southampton. There he became involved in the excavation (1961–1968) of the Fishbourne Roman Palace in West Sussex. Another site in southern England led him away from the Roman period. He began a long series of summer excavations (1969–1988) of the Iron Age hill fort at Danebury, Hampshire and was subsequently involved in the Danebury Environs Programme (1989–1995). His interest in Iron Age Britain and Europe generated a number of publications and he became an acknowledged authority on the Celts.

Other sites he has worked on include Hengistbury Head in Dorset, Mount Batten in Devon, Le Câtel in Jersey, and Le Yaudet in Brittany, reflecting his interest in the communities of Atlantic Europe during the Iron Age. In his later works, he sets out the thesis that Celtic culture originated along the length of the Atlantic seaboard in the Bronze Age before being taken inland, which stands in contrast to the more generally accepted view that Celtic origins lie with the Hallstatt culture of the Alps. One of his most recent projects has been in the Najerilla valley, La Rioja, Spain, which straddles "the interface between the Celtiberian heartland of central Iberia and the Atlantic zone of the Bay of Biscay".

Cunliffe was elected as a Fellow of the British Academy in 1979. He lives with his wife in Oxford.

== Positions and honours ==
- President, Council for British Archaeology (1976–1979)
- Fellow of the British Academy (FBA; 1979)
- Former President, University of Cambridge Archaeological Field Club (AFC)
- Member, Ancient Monuments Advisory Committee of English Heritage, since 1984
- Honorary Graduate, Doctor of Science, University of Bath (1984)
- Member, Advisory Committee of The Discovery Programme (Ireland), since 1991
- Commander of the Order of the British Empire (CBE) in the 1994 Birthday Honours for services to archaeology
- Trustee of the British Museum
- Governor, Museum of London
- Fellow of the Society of Antiquaries of London (FSA)
- Original Chair of Steering Committee for the e-journal Internet Archaeology
- Knight Bachelor, 17 June 2006
- Interim chair of English Heritage in September 2008
- Chairman, The British Museum Friends (until 2009)
- Founding Fellow, The Learned Society of Wales
- Grahame Clark Medal of the British Academy (2004)
- Corresponding Member of the Real Academia de la Historia (since 2006)
- Member of the Antiquity Trust, which supports the publication of the archaeology journal Antiquity.

== Works ==
- The Roman Occupation, Introduction, Cumberland and Westmorland, The Buildings of England, Nikolaus Pevsner, Harmondsworth: Penguin (1967)
- Roman Hampshire, Introduction, Hampshire and the Isle of Wight, The Buildings of England, Nikolaus Pevsner, Harmondsworth: Penguin (1967)
- The Roman Occupation, Introduction, Worcestershire, The Buildings of England, Nikolaus Pevsner, Harmondsworth: Penguin (1968)
- Roman Kent, Introduction, North East and East Kent, The Buildings of England, Nikolaus Pevsner, Harmondsworth: Penguin (1969)
- Fishbourne: A Roman Palace and Its Garden (1971) (updated ed., Stroud: Tempus, 1998) ISBN 978-0-75241-408-9
- Cradle of England: An Introduction through Archaeology to the Early History of England and a Brief Guide to Selected Sites in the South, London: British Broadcasting Corporation (1972) ISBN 0-5631-2197-1
- The Regni in the "Peoples of Roman Britain" series Ed.Keith Brannigan, pub. Duckworth (1973) ISBN 0-7156-0699-9
- Iron Age Communities in Britain (1974) ISBN 0-7100-8725-X (4th edition, Jan 2005)
- Fishbourne: A Guide to the Site (1977)
- Excavations in Bath 1950–1975 (1979)
- Danebury: Anatomy of an Iron Age Hillfort (1983)
- Roman Bath Discovered (1984)
- The Celtic World (1987)
- Greeks, Romans and Barbarians (1988)
- Wessex to AD 1000 (1993)
- Book of Roman Bath (1995) London: Batsford; English Heritage. ISBN 0-7134-7893-4
- Fishbourne Roman Palace, Cheltenham: Tempus (1998) ISBN 978-0-75241-408-9
- Facing the Ocean: The Atlantic and Its Peoples, 8000 BC to AD 1500 Oxford University Press (2001)
- The Oxford Illustrated History of Prehistoric Europe (2001)
- The Extraordinary Voyage of Pytheas the Greek: The Man Who Discovered Britain (2001), Walker & Co; ISBN 0-8027-1393-9 (2002 Penguin ed. with new post-script: ISBN 0-14-200254-2)
- The Celts: A Very Short Introduction, Oxford University Press (2003) ISBN 978-0-19280-418-1
- Les Fouilles du Yaudet en Ploulec'h, Côtes-d'Armor. Volume 1: Le Site, Le Yaudet, dans L'Histoire et la Legende with Patrick Galliou, Oxford School of Archaeology (2004) ISBN 9780947816599
- England's Landscape: The West (English Heritage 2006)
- Les Fouilles du Yaudet en Ploulec'h, Côtes-d'Armor. Volume 2: Le Site, de la Prehistoire, a la Fin de L'Empire Gaulois with Patrick Galliou, Oxford University School of Archaeology (2006) ISBN 978-0-95496-270-8
- Les Fouilles du Yaudet en Ploulec'h, Côtes-d'Armor. Volume 3: Le Site, du Quatrieme Siecle apr. J.-C. a aujourd'hui with Patrick Galliou, Oxford University School of Archaeology (2007) ISBN 978-0-95496-272-2
- Europe Between the Oceans: 9000 BC – AD 1000, Yale University Press (2008) ISBN 978-0-30011-923-7
- A Valley in La Rioja: The Najerilla Project with Gary Lock, Oxford University School of Archaeology (2008) ISBN 978-1-90590-515-7
- Druids: A Very Short Introduction, Oxford University Press (2010) ISBN 978-0-19953-940-6
- Celtic from the West. Alternative Perspectives From Archaeology, Genetics and Literature, Oxford: Oxbow Books (2010)
- Britain Begins, Oxford University Press (2012) ISBN 978-0-19960-933-8
- Celtic from the West 2: Rethinking The Bronze Age and the Arrival of Indo-European in Atlantic Europe editor with John T. Koch, Oxford: Oxbow Books (2013) ISBN 978-1-84217-529-3
- By Steppe, Desert, and Ocean: The Birth of Eurasia, Oxford University Press (2015) ISBN 978-0-19968-917-0
- Le Yaudet en Ploulec'h, Côtes-d'Armor: Archéologie d'une Agglomération, IIe siècle av. J.-C. – XXe siècle apr. J.-C. with Patrick Galliou, Rennes: Presses Universitaires de Rennes (2015) ISBN 978-2-75354-174-0
- Celtic from the West 3: Atlantic Europe in the Metal Ages – Questions of Shared Language editor with John T. Koch, Oxford: Oxbow Books (2016) ISBN 978-1-78570-227-3
- On the Ocean: The Mediterranean and the Atlantic from Prehistory to AD 1500, Oxford University Press (2017) ISBN 978-0-19875-789-4
- The Ancient Celts, Oxford University Press (2nd ed. 2018) ISBN 978-0-19875-293-6
- Exploring Celtic Origins: New Ways Forward in Archaeology, Linguistics, and Genetics editor with John T. Koch, Oxford: Oxbow Books (2019) ISBN 978-1-78925-088-6
- Sark: A Sacred Island? volume 1: Fieldwork and Excavations 2004–2017 with Emma Durham, Oxford University School of Archaeology (2019) ISBN 978-1-90590-546-1
- The Scythians: Nomad Warriors of the Steppe, Oxford University Press (2019) ISBN 978-0-19882-012-3
- Bretons and Britons: The Fight for Identity, Oxford University Press (2021) ISBN 978-0-19885-162-2
- Facing the Sea of Sand: The Sahara and the Peoples of Northern Africa, Oxford University Press (2023) ISBN 978-0-19285-888-7
- Driven by the Monsoons: Through the Indian Ocean and the Seas of China, Oxford University Press (2025) ISBN 978-0-19888-681-5
