= Susan Kane =

American art historian and archaeologist

- Born: 1948 (age 77–78)
- Education: Barnard College, Bryn Mawr College
- Known for: Cyrenaica Archaeological Project, Sangro Valley Project
- Awards: 2013 Presidential Award, Society for American Archaeology.
- Scientific career
- Fields: Archaeology
- Workplaces: Oberlin College

Susan Kane is an American art historian and a pioneer of field archaeology. Her work to preserve Libyan archaeological sites during Operation Unified Protector earned her the Society for American Archaeology Presidential Award in 2013. She currently directs the Cyrenaica Archaeological Project and the Sangro Valley Project in Tornareccio, Italy. Since 1977, Kane has served as the chair of the Curricular Committee on Archaeology at Oberlin College.

Kane studied Classics at Barnard College and holds a doctorate in classical archaeology doctorate from Bryn Mawr College. Before joining Oberlin, she was the past Vice President for publications for the Archaeological Institute of America, specializing in Greek, Italic, and Roman sculpture and architecture. Her current research focuses on the use of white marble in the ancient Mediterranean. She has excavated at a variety of sites in the United States, United Kingdom, Greece, Yugoslavia, Libya, and Italy.
