= Moses Najara I =

Turkish rabbinical writer (c. 1508 – 1581)

Personal life
- Born: c. 1508 Probably Safed, Mamluk Empire Palestine
- Died: 1581 Damascus, Ottoman Empire
- Children: Israel Najara
- Parent: Levi Najara
- Notable work: Leḳaḥ Ṭob
- Other name: Najjara
- Occupation: Rabbi, writer

Religious life
- Religion: Judaism

Moses Najara I (or Najjara, c 1508 – 1581) was a Turkish rabbinical writer, son of Levi Najara, born probably at Safed. He lived at Damascus, where he was rabbi, and died there in 1581. He wrote a work entitled Leḳaḥ Ṭob (לקח טוב, Constantinople, 1571), and was father of the poet Israel Najara.
