= Moses Najara II =

Jewish poet and rabbi of Gaza

Personal life
- Parent: Israel Najara
- Known for: Jewish poetry, rabbi of Gaza
- Occupation: Poet, rabbi

Religious life
- Religion: Judaism

Moses Najara II was a Jewish poet, son of Israel Najara, whom he succeeded as rabbi of Gaza. His poetry is praised by his contemporaries, but none survives.

== Jewish Encyclopedia bibliography ==
- Leser Landshuth, 'Ammude ha-'Abodah
- David Conforte, Ḳore ha-Dorot
- Dukes, Gesch. der Neuhebräischen Poesie
- Moritz Steinschneider, Polemische Literatur, 1868, p. 350
- Magyar Zsidó Szemle, 1885
