= Santa María la Real of Nájera =

Monastery in Spain

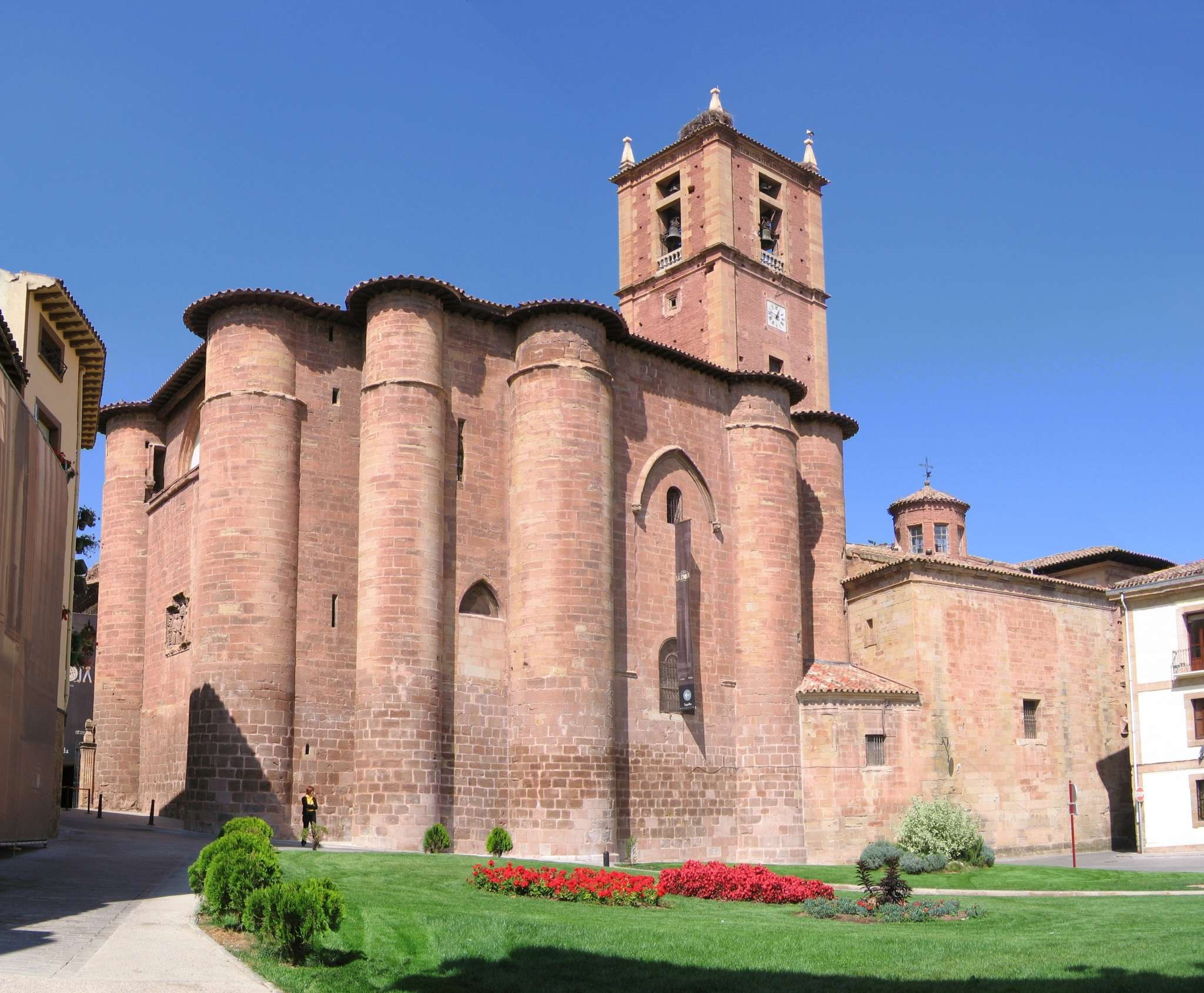
The exterior of Santa María la Real shows characteristics of a fortified building

Santa María la Real is a monastery in the small town of Nájera in the La Rioja community, Spain. Originally a royal foundation, it was ceded by Alfonso VI to the Cluniac order. It was an important pilgrimage stop on the Camino de Santiago. It is particularly well known for the woodwork in the choir of the church.

== History ==
The first construction on the site dates back to the 11th century. Santa Maria la Real and the attached royal pantheon were founded by King García Sánchez III of Navarre in 1052. It was later elevated to an episcopal see and placed under Papal authority.

In 1076 the kingdom of Navarre passed into the hands of Alfonso VI of León and Castile. The Mozarabic Rite (sometimes called the Isidorean or Spanish Rite) was replaced with the Latin Rite. The Missal of Silos, a Mozarabic missal which is the oldest known Western manuscript on paper, was created in the monastery in the 11th century.

=== Cluniac Order ===
In 1079, the see was transferred to Calahorra, which had been the seat of a bishopric before the Muslim Conquest. Alfonso gave St María la Real to the Cluniac order and it became one of only two important Cluniac centres South of the Pyrenees. As a center of Cluniac power, the monastery is associated with the introduction of the Cluniac reform to Castile. It appears that this helped Alfonso assert his control over Riojan territory.

In 1142, the Abbot of Cluny Peter the Venerable visited the monastery. While in Spain, he met with translators from the Arabic language and commissioned the first translation into a European language of the Qur'an.

The monastery remained in Cluniac hands until the 15th century, when it was established through Papal mandate as an independent abbacy under Rodrigo Borgia (later Pope Alexander VI), at which time it underwent a major reconstruction.

=== Later history of monastery ===
As the popularity of the Camino de Santiago waned, so did the fortunes of the monastery, which depended on the wealth generated by traffic of pilgrims. The monastery fell into a long decay. In the nineteenth century it suffered under the Napoleonic occupation of Spain and anti-monastic legislation in the 1830s (the Ecclesiastical confiscations of Mendizábal) before being declared a national monument in 1889. The fortunes of the monastery further revived with the arrival of Franciscans at the end of the 19th century.

== Monastery ==
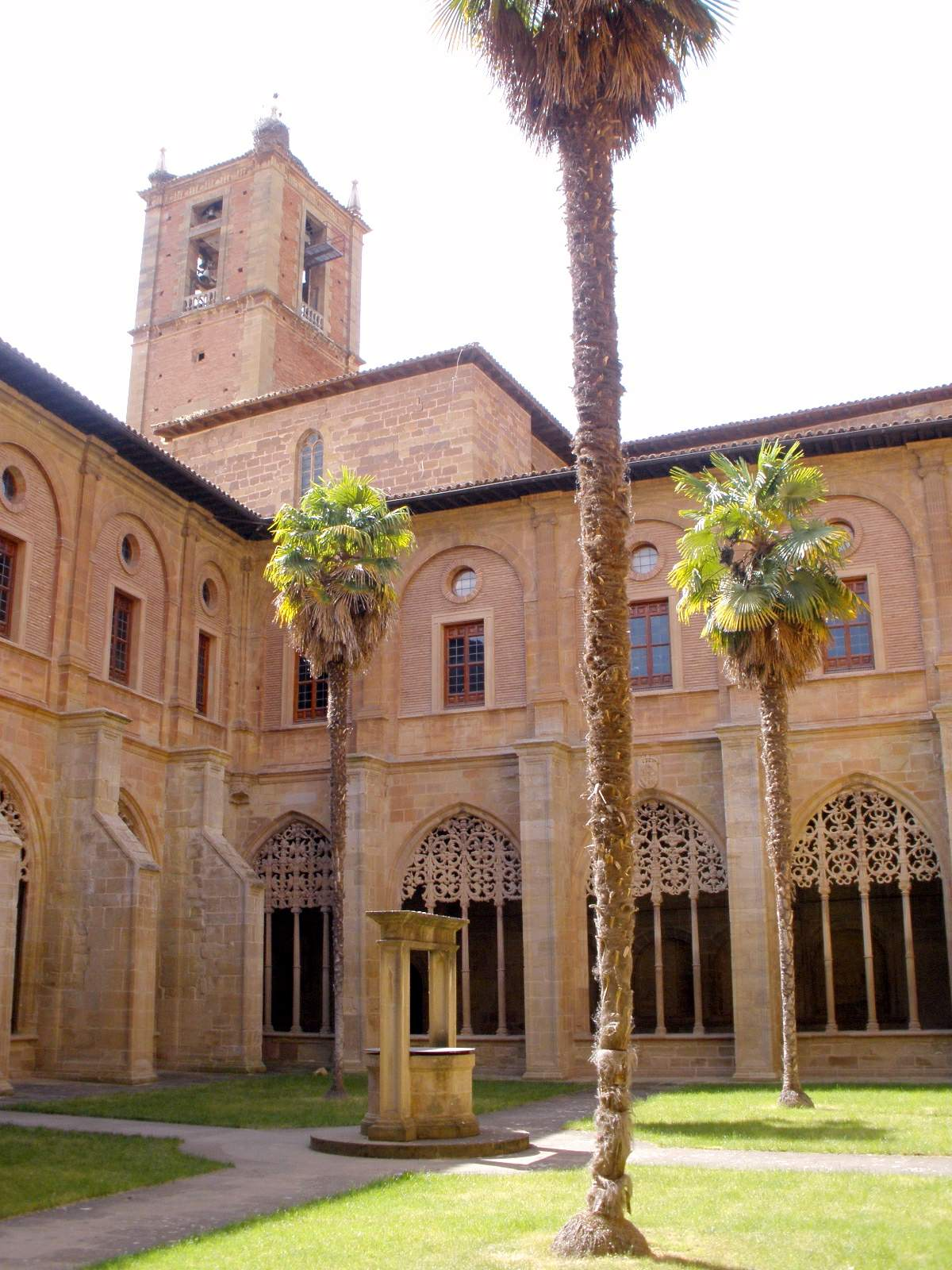
Exterior of the cloister and view of the monastic tower.

The exterior of the Monastery of Santa María la Real de Nájera is a mixture of different styles, fruit of its long story. Defensive needs led to high walls and buttress with the function of bastions. The 17th century left the decoration of the walls and the doors and the squared tower. The portico of the church was built between the years 1621 and 1625.

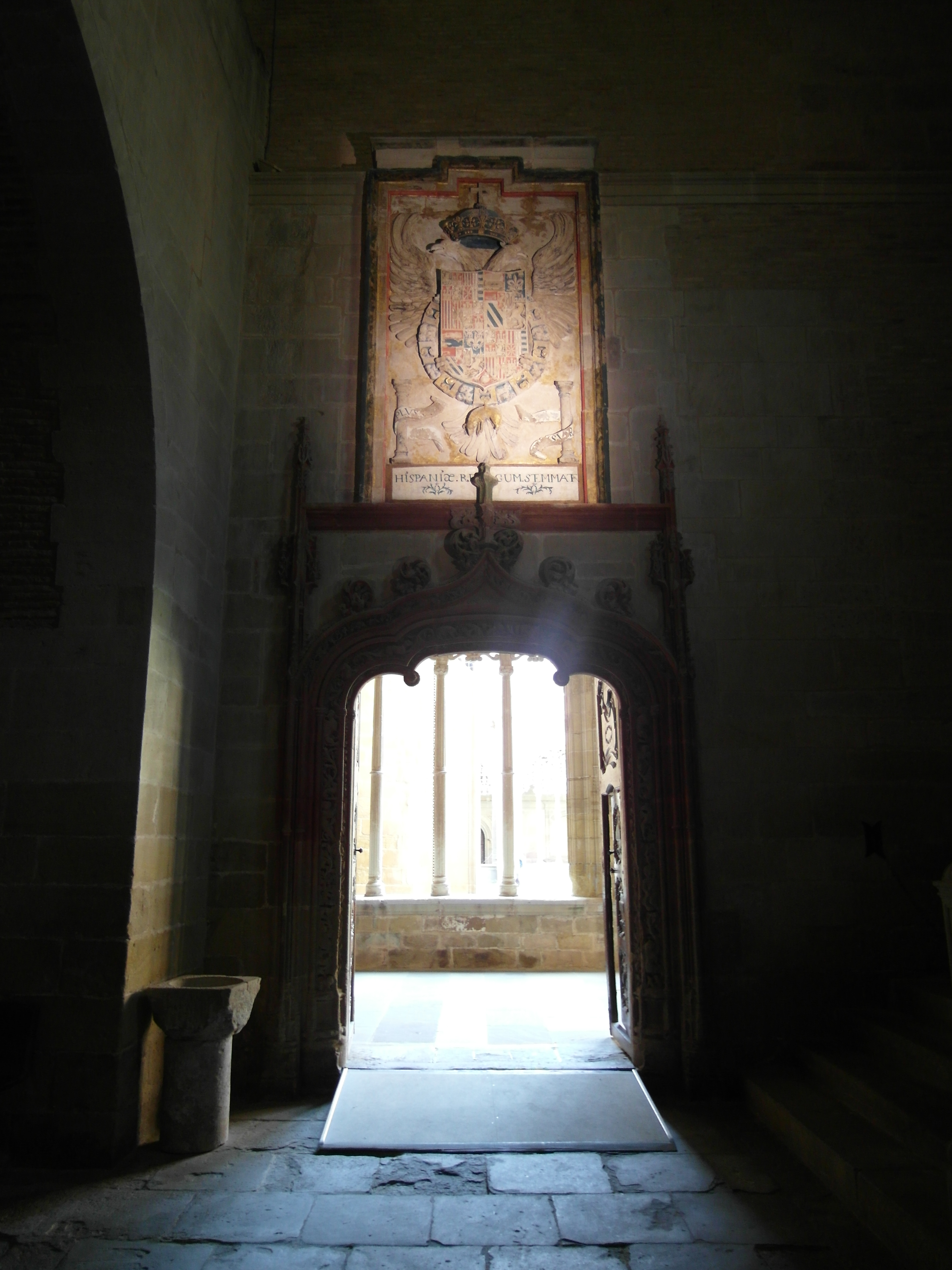
Gate of Charles I in Flamboyant style and the royal coat of arms with the double-headed eagle.

Inside the monastery, two main areas can be discerned: the church with the Royal Mausoleum and the cloister, so-called of the Knights. The access to the cloister is through the so-called Gate of Charles I. This gate is of flamboyant style and is very decorated; a big coat of arms of Charles I can be found above it with a double-headed eagle. This coat of arms was carried to honor the king, who generously contributed to the construction of the cloister.

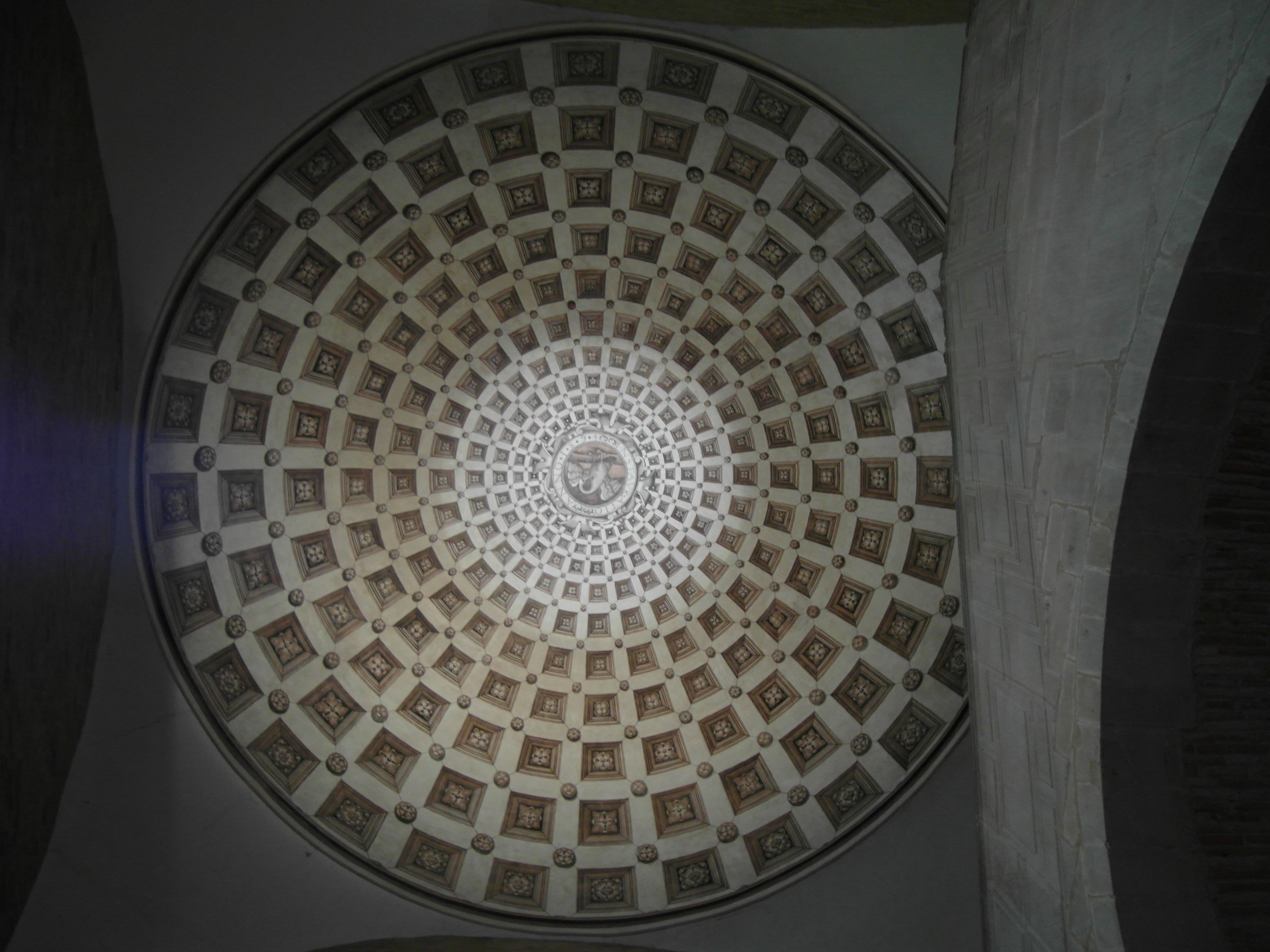
View of the dome with Trompe-l'œil. On the right the Guard rail of the Royal Stairs.

The stairs to access the upper cloister can be found next to the gate. This stairs are in Renaissance style and is covered with a hemispherical dome decorated with panels painted in Trompe-l'œil. The central motif of the decoration is a bird: a pelican. The date of its construction is the year 1594 and it is called the Royal Stairs.

=== The church ===
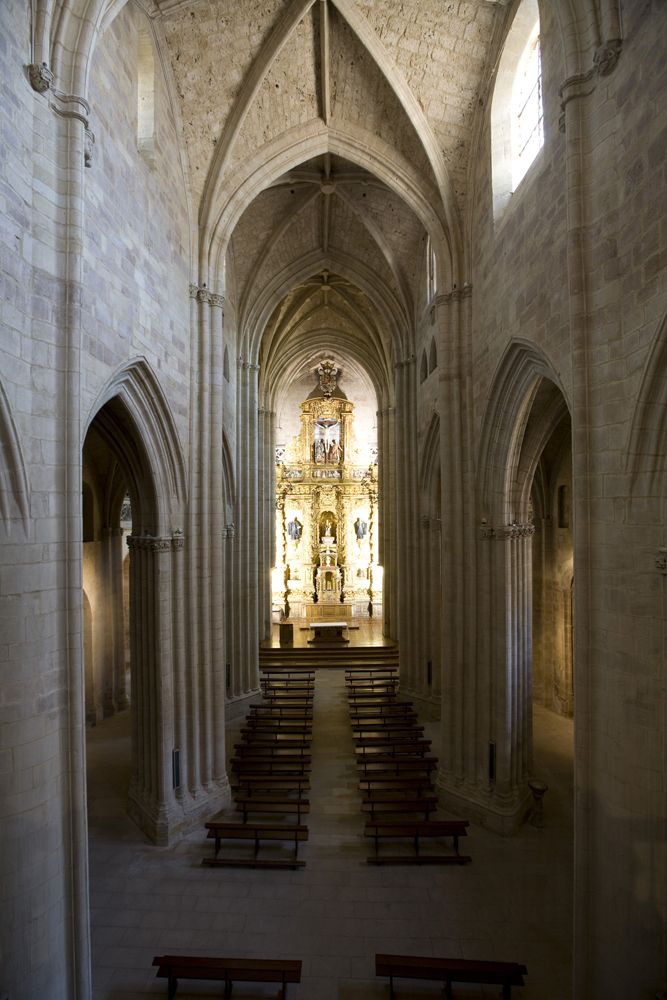
Interior of the church of the Monastery.

The primitive church honoring the Virgen de la Cueva (Virgin of the Cave) was inaugurated in 1052 and consecrates the primitive temple to the Virgin of the Cave. The style of the building is romanesque with Mozarabic influences.

The current temple was built between 1422 and 1453, in flowery Gothic style, presenting stylized and at the same time simple forms. All the vaults are simple ribbed except for the one covering of the central Apse; the side apses are squared and the triforium has almost triangular windows.

The interior has three naves separated with 10 columns. Beneath the choir the entrance to the cave can be found, where the image of the Virgin is believed to have been discovered, a place which has remained unchanged since then.

The main reredos dates back to the 17th century, of baroque style, and with big highly decorated Solomonic columns with vine grapes and leaves. The dressing room (Camarín) of the Virgin is located in the central part, with the original image, surrounded by the founders of the Benedictines, in its male (Saint Benedict) and female (Saint Scholastica) branches and a depiction of the founder kings. The depiction of the elements that are believed to have been found next the image of the Virgin is noteworthy: a jar with Madonna lilies (emblem of the monastery), a lamp and a bell. Above these elements, a frieze tells the story of the discovery of the Virgin by the king Don García. A Calvary concludes the reredos.

In the left aisle, a replica of the former main reredos which existed before the construction of the current can be found. Part of the original is located in the Antwerp museum, where it arrived after being sold in the 19th century. Its author was Hans Memling.

==== The image of the Virgin ====
The image which originally leads to the construction of the religious complex is a medieval polychrome (only in the front face) sculpture carved in wood. It depicts the Virgin holding baby Jesus, imparting the blessings with the right hand while holding a ball on the other.

The image was restored in 1948 by the Institute Príncipe de Viana.

The monastery may have owned a gemstone now part of the Imperial State Crown, created in 1838 for the coronation of Queen Victoria. The Black Prince's Ruby can be found on the centre of the cross of the front face. There is not any doubt that the Black Prince took jewels to England after assisting Peter the Cruel at the Battle of Nájera, although the history of this particular stone is disputed.

==== The cave ====
The cave where the image was discovered, integrated into the temple, is one of the many that can be found in the surroundings of Nájera and which have had different uses through time. According to the tradition, this is the cave where a small chapel honoring this Virgin originally was located and where it was worshiped. In 1044 the king, who was hunting with falconry, following its hawk found the Virgin with a bouquet of Madonna lilies, a lamp and a bell in this cave. The king attributed the victories which followed in the wars of conquest against the Muslims to the image found.

Until the construction of the main reredos, the image if the Virgin was kept in this place. It was later replaced by other coming from the chapel of the Alcázar Real, which is the one that can be seen today since 1845. This carving dates back to the end of the 13th century. It was restored in 1998. The cave has been one of the places chosen by numbers of noblemen and religious leaders for their burial. Until the restoration works at the end of the 20th century, those tombs were located on the ground of the building.

==== Choir ====
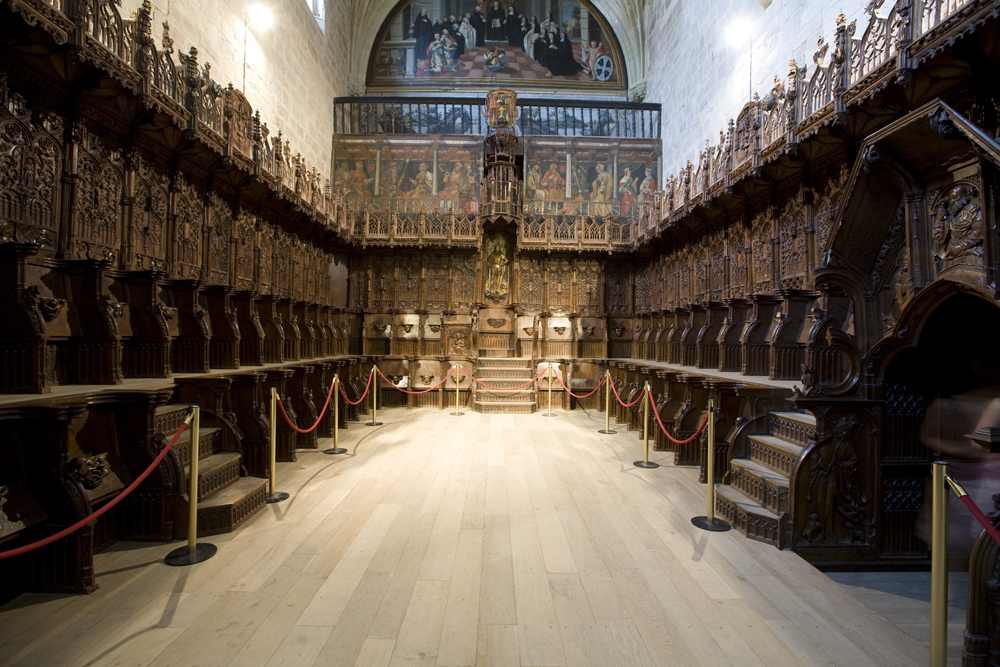
Monastic choir, with the seatings and the paintings.

Noteworthy in the Choir is the set of chairs, of gothic style. It was created between the years 1493 and 1495, attributing the work management to the brothers Andrés and Nicolás Amutio, and funded by the abbot Pablo Martínez de Uruñuela (they are depicted on the back of the second lower left chair).

The carvings of the backs, as well as of the misericords, are all different from each other and represent religious symbols, scenes of daily life and leading figures at the time. Noteworthy is the carving of the abbatial chair, where the king García of Nájera is depicted.

The set of chairs is crowned by two big paintings. In one of them a gallery with six couples of kings properly identified can be observed. The set is concluded with a baroque depiction of a Benedictine congregation over a frieze with slender pillars which enclose a rococo landscape. It resulted very damaged after the abandonment period of the monumental complex at the end of the 19th century.

==== Mausoleums and chapels ====
===== Royal Mausoleum =====
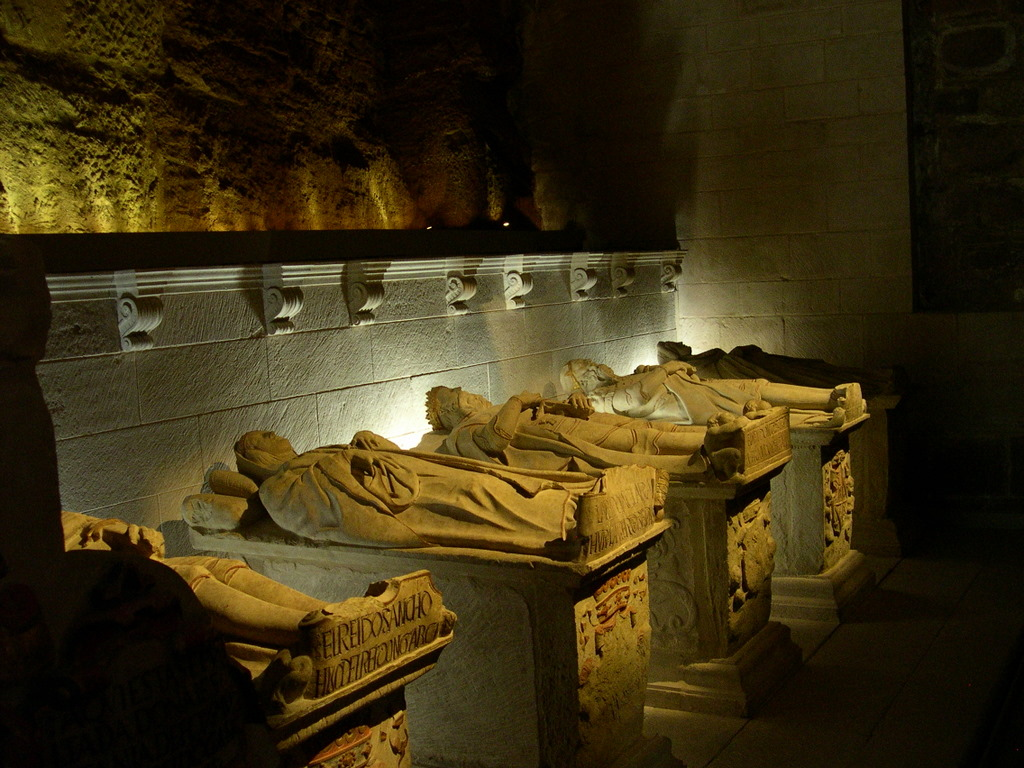
Tombs of the kings of Nájera-Pamplona.

The tombs of the kings of the Kingdom Nájera-Pamplona, the precursor of the Kingdom of Navarra, can be found at the feet of the main nave, on both sides of the entrance to the Cave. Here are buried the kings of the Jimena dynasty, or the Abarca dynasty, which hold the throne from 918 to 1076, and which was followed by García Ramírez who ruled from 1135 to 1234. This dynasty comes from the Abarcas.

The sculptural work formed by the funerary coffers is later to the period of the bodies that can be found in them. They are of Renaissance style with certain a Plateresque look. The decoration is austere, the reclining figures of the different personalities with their king attributes and an epitaph corbel are placed above the white stone burial urns. This Mausoleum was built around 1556.

===== Mausoleum of the infantes =====
The mausoleum of the infantes can be found on the left aisle where the remains of those royal personalities who did not become kings are located. Among all the tombs the most relevant is the tomb of Blanca Garcés, also known as Blanca of Navarra. Blanca of Navarra's tomb, of which only the lid is preserved, is the only original of the set. It dates back to the 12th century and is a piece of Romanesque manufacture. It is decorated with bas-reliefs which depict scenes of the Gospels and the life of the deceased, who died at a very early age.

===== Mausoleum of the Dukes of Nájera =====
The high altar is located on the left side of the mausoleum of Manrique de Lara, duques of Nájera since its creation by the catholic Monarchs in 1482. The dukes of Nájera ruled the city until the year 1600 when they left no successors. The most relevant among them is the tomb of the first duke of, known as the Strong, Pedro Manrique III de Lara which played a relevant role in the court of Ferdinand II of Aragon, taking part with him in the Granada War and then as virrey of Navarra after the conquer of this kingdom in 1512. Also buried there is Juan Esteban Manrique de Lara, who was virrey of Navarra in 1521 and who fought by Ignatius of Loyola in the siege of Pamplona.

=== Cloister of the Knights ===
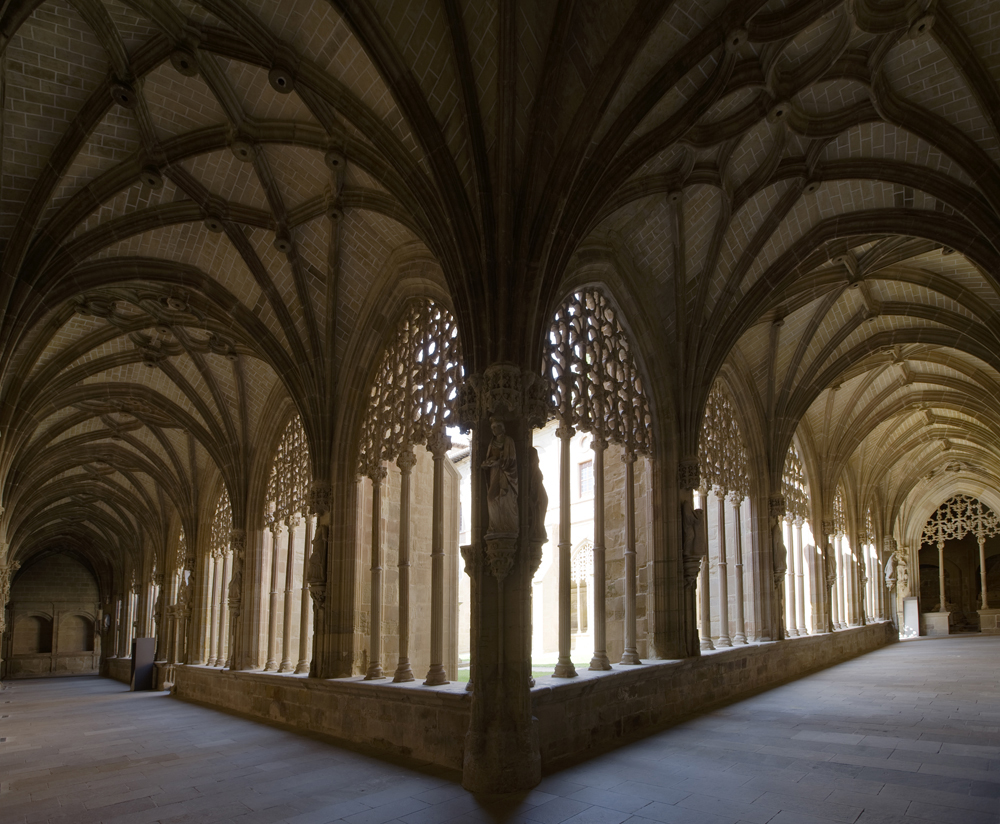
Lower cloister.

Between the years 1517 and 1528 the cloister was built, which combines flowery Gothic in domes and pillars, with plateresque in the tracery of the arcs. Most gravestones of the mural tombs located there belong also to this style.

The arcs, in the number of 24, are decorated with stone traceries, each one of different motifs. This stone latticework appears supported by slender pillars. The upper cloister was built in 1578 above this level.

The name cloister of the Knights is because of the large number of noblemen who chose this place for their burial. Of those tombs, just those located in the walls remain, given that those on the floor were removed during the restoration given the bad conservation status they presented.

Abandonment and misuse of the monumental complex during the 19th century deteriorated the cloister significantly. Right now only the lower cloister is restored.

==== Chapel of the queen Mencía López de Haro ====
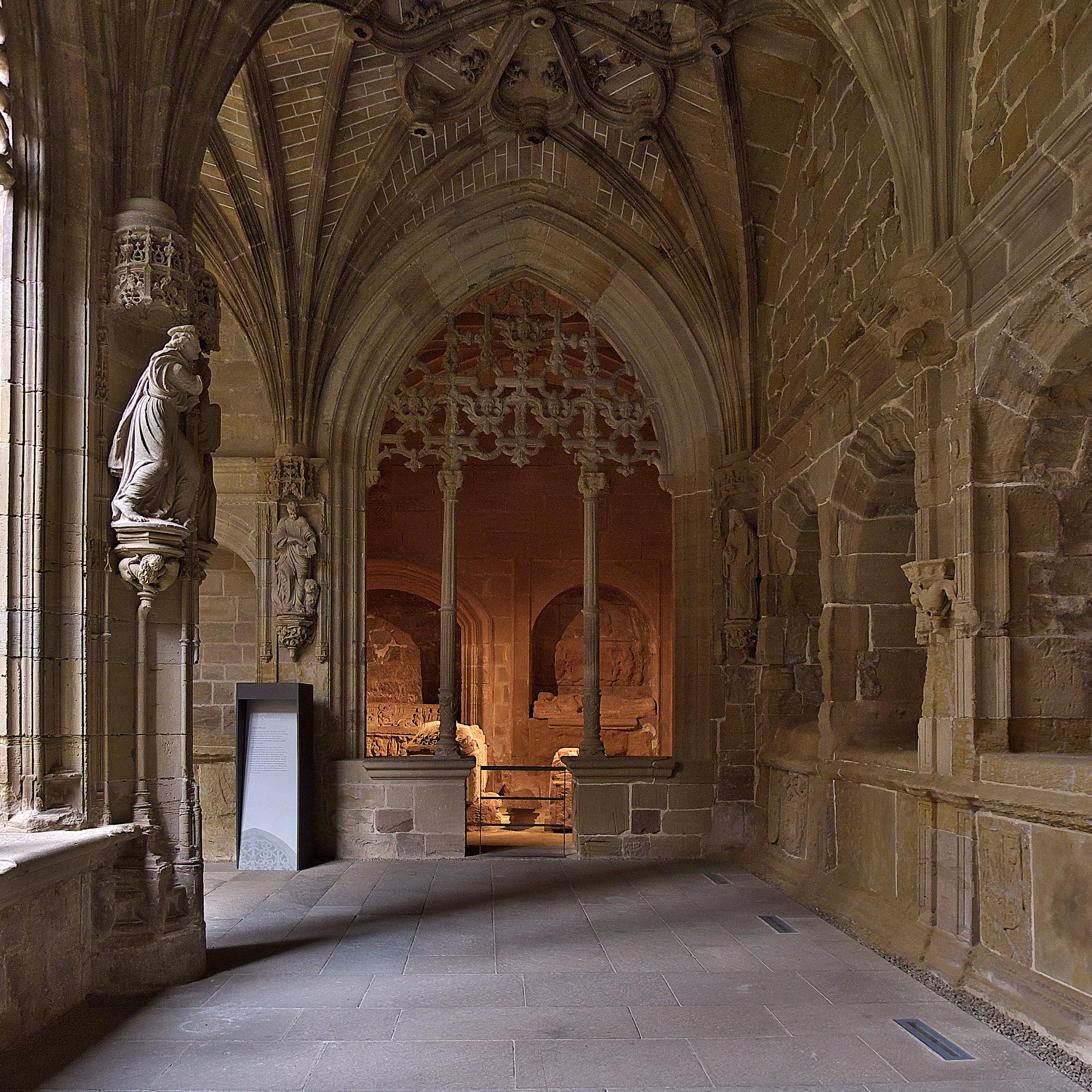
Funerary chapel of Doña Mencía

The entrance to the tomb of the queen of Portugal, Mencía López de Haro, is located on one of the west side corners of the cloister. This lady was the wife, married for the second time, of the Portuguese King Sancho II the Caped. When this king died in the year 1248 Mencía returned to Nájera, where she lived until her death in 1272. The sarcophagus dates back to the 13th century and it is decorated with the coat of arms of Portugal and the coat of arms of López de Haro. Next to Mencía's tomb her brother's and Garci Lasso Ruiz de la Vega's can be found, who died in the battle of Nájera in the year 1367. The chapel was the home of a Christ which was greatly venerated.

==== Mausoleum of Diego López de Haro, the Good ====
The lineage of López de Haro hold the title of counts of Nájera and lords of Biscay since king Sancho the Great appointed them until the 19th century.

The Mausoleum of Diego López de Haro, known as the good, 10th lord of Biscay (1170–1214) is located next to the entrance to the church and can be reached at the feet of the main nave, in the south wall of the cloister. At the feet of the sarcophagus of Don Diego her second wife's, Toda Pérez de Azagra, who died in 1216. The urns are Romanesque, but Renaissance external decoration elements were later added. The bas-relieves depict scenes of burial and personalities in clothes of the 18th century.

==== Access gate to the church ====
The gate which grants access to the temple is an excellent example of plateresque carving. It dates back to the first half of the 16th century and is decorated with medallions, vegetal motives and fantasy animals grouped in rectangular panels. It is carved in walnut wood.
