= Missal of Silos =

Oldest known document on paper created in Europe

The Missal of Silos is the oldest known document on paper (as opposed to parchment) created in Europe; it dates to before 1080 AD. The manuscript was written on quarto; it comprises 157 folios, of which folios 1 to 37 are on paper and the rest are on parchment. Strictly speaking, it is not a missal: It has been described as a breviary-missal. It can also be described as a Liber Mysticus or Breviarum gothicum.

The missal is "Codex 6" held in the library of the Monastery of Santo Domingo de Silos near Burgos, Spain. While the codex is named after its long-term home in Silos, it was not made at the Silos monastery's scriptorium; it was made at the monastery of Santa María la Real of Nájera. The paper for the missal is believed to have been manufactured in Muslim-ruled territory (Al-Andalus), even though Nájera was in Christian territory at the time the document was created.

The manuscript relates to the Mozarabic rite. This was suppressed in 1080 by Pope Gregory VII (something which helps date the manuscript). The monastery adopted the Roman rite, but the library continued to hold a collection of liturgical manuscripts of the Mozarabic rite until the 19th century when some were sold.

== Access ==
The library is accessible to researchers. In 2013, the manuscript was inspected by Umberto Eco, who had referred to Silos in his 1980 novel The Name of the Rose. Eco's visit was widely reported in the Spanish press.
