= Sangro Valley Project =

Archaeological excavation in Italy

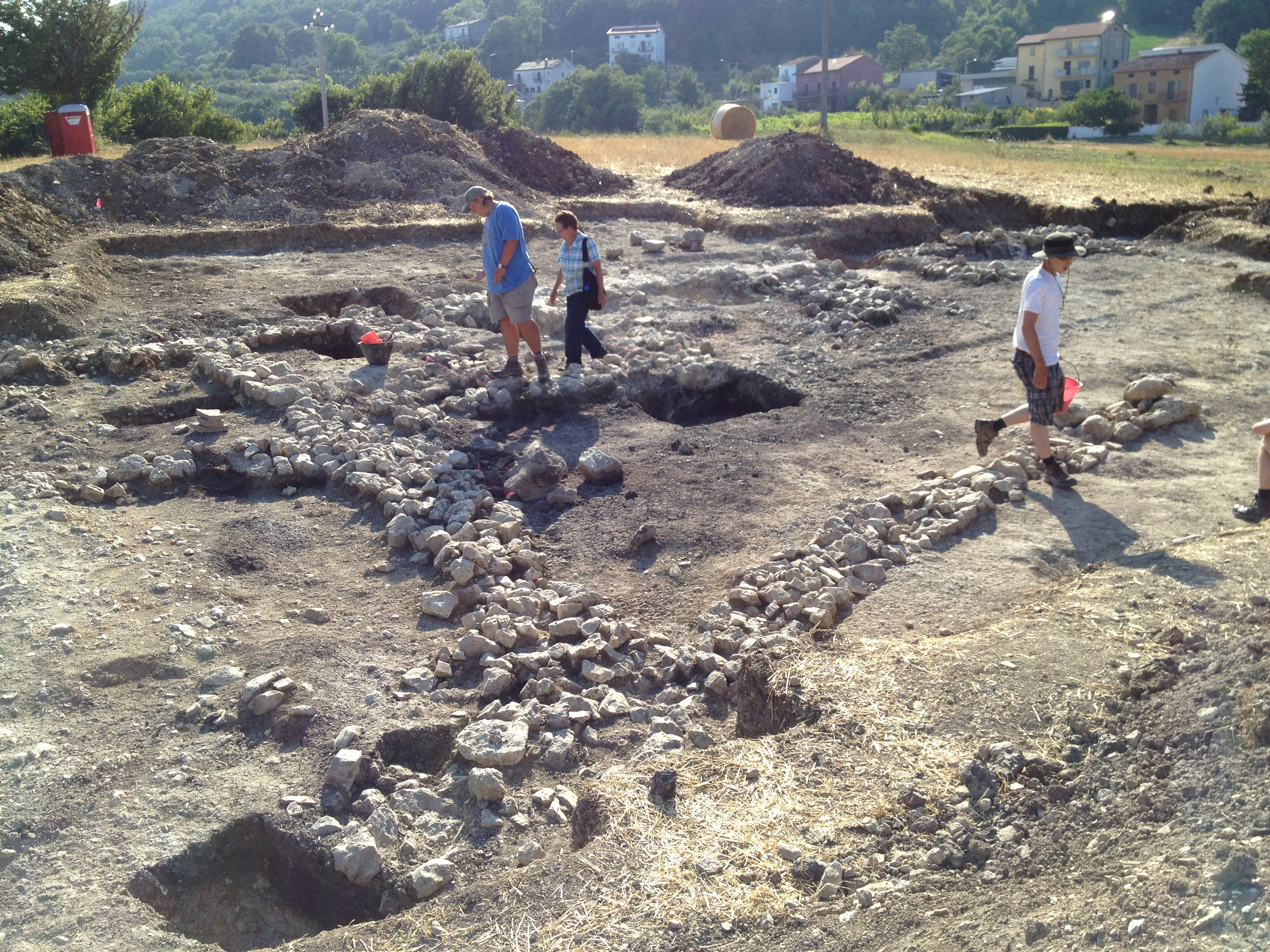
The site of the Sangro Valley Project 2013, in Tornareccio, Italy.

The Sangro Valley Project was an Anglo-American archaeological excavation in Abruzzo, Italy. It was notable for its revolutionary interpretation of Samnium as a dynamic participant in the history of the Adriatic as well as its early adoption of modern excavation technologies, such as GIS. The project was managed by Oberlin College in collaboration with Oxford University, Durham University and the Soprintendenza per i Beni Archeologici dell'Abruzzo, is a multi-disciplinary team of specialists from Canada, Italy, the United Kingdom, and the United States.

== Research Objectives ==
As a chartered excavation, the project sought to characterize and investigate the nature, pattern and dynamics of human habitation and land use in the longue durée within the context of a Mediterranean river valley system. The project sustained both a research program and a month-long didactic field school for undergraduates and saw the symbiotic relation between the two as fundamental to its mission. It also sought to engage in knowledge transfer to the benefit of the local communities, acting as a professional research partner for the Soprintendenza in its work in the region.

== Project History ==
=== Opi Phase (I) ===
The Sangro Valley Project was initiated in 1994 by Oxford professors John Lloyd and Gary Lock, Amalia Faustoferri and Cinzia Morelli of Beni Archeologici dell'Abruzzo, and Neil Christie of Leicester University. As part of Lloyd's vision, the program would be modeled on Graeme Barker's survey project in the Biferno Valley in Molise, the neighboring region to the south, one of the first major multi-disciplinary studies of a Mediterranean valley through time. The Sangro Valley Project sought to adapt upon Barker's methods in order to understand the human impact on the Sangro Valley between prehistoric and medieval periods. Three different environments were chosen for testing through field survey. The first, the mountainous area of the upper valley around Opi, Abruzzo, would be the primary study of the earliest phase. The next two, the complex hilly landscape of the middle valley around Monte Pallano and a more lowland environment around Fara, would later be excavated. The transformations uncovered through the field survey included the expansion and contraction of farming and settlements as well as the development of long-distance exchange and the emergence of the powerful local warrior-aristocracy in the Archaic period that maintained communication with Etruscan, Campanian and southern Italy. The inter-relationship between the sites identified in field survey for the Sangro Middle Valley was analyzed in a pioneering GIS spatial analysis.

=== Middle Valley Phase (II) (1999-2002) ===
In 1999, the project became an international research station, headed by Oberlin professor Susan Kane and Edward Bispham of the University of Oxford. Phase II sustained both a research program in the middle valley, with John Lloyd's survey dataset, and a didactic field school with excavations centering on Monte Pallano. Between 1994 and 2004, substantial complexes of public buildings were excavated on Monte Pallano by the Soprintendenza per i Beni Archeologici dell'Abruzzo. These discoveries demonstrated the theory that Monte Pallano was a fortified hill-top settlement site, as well as a political and religious centre in the Samnite period.

In 1999, the Sangro Valley Project uncovered the precinct of a sanctuary of unexpected wealth and sophistication adjacent to this complex. The existence of a late-Hellenistic sacred buildings was demonstrated by the large amount of architectonic debris made part of the second-phase terrace, which was supported by a large, late second century B.C. terrace wall of substantial polygonal masonry. The area appears to have been rebuilt in the Augustan period with another phase of terracing wall, and there were further later phases of rebuilding. In 2003, the recovery of a complete stratigraphic section across the site was completed.

=== Monte Pallano and Environs Phase (2002-2004) ===
The survey work conducted by the first phase of the Sangro Valley Project showed that Monte Pallano was the lynchpin for understanding the area that it dominates. Lloyd's legacy data has been used to create a new research program of archaeological survey work in the area around the mountain. These investigations included field survey, geoprospection, in-woods survey and terrace mapping, led by Dr. Sam Carrier of Oberlin.

=== Acquachiara Phase (2002-2009) ===
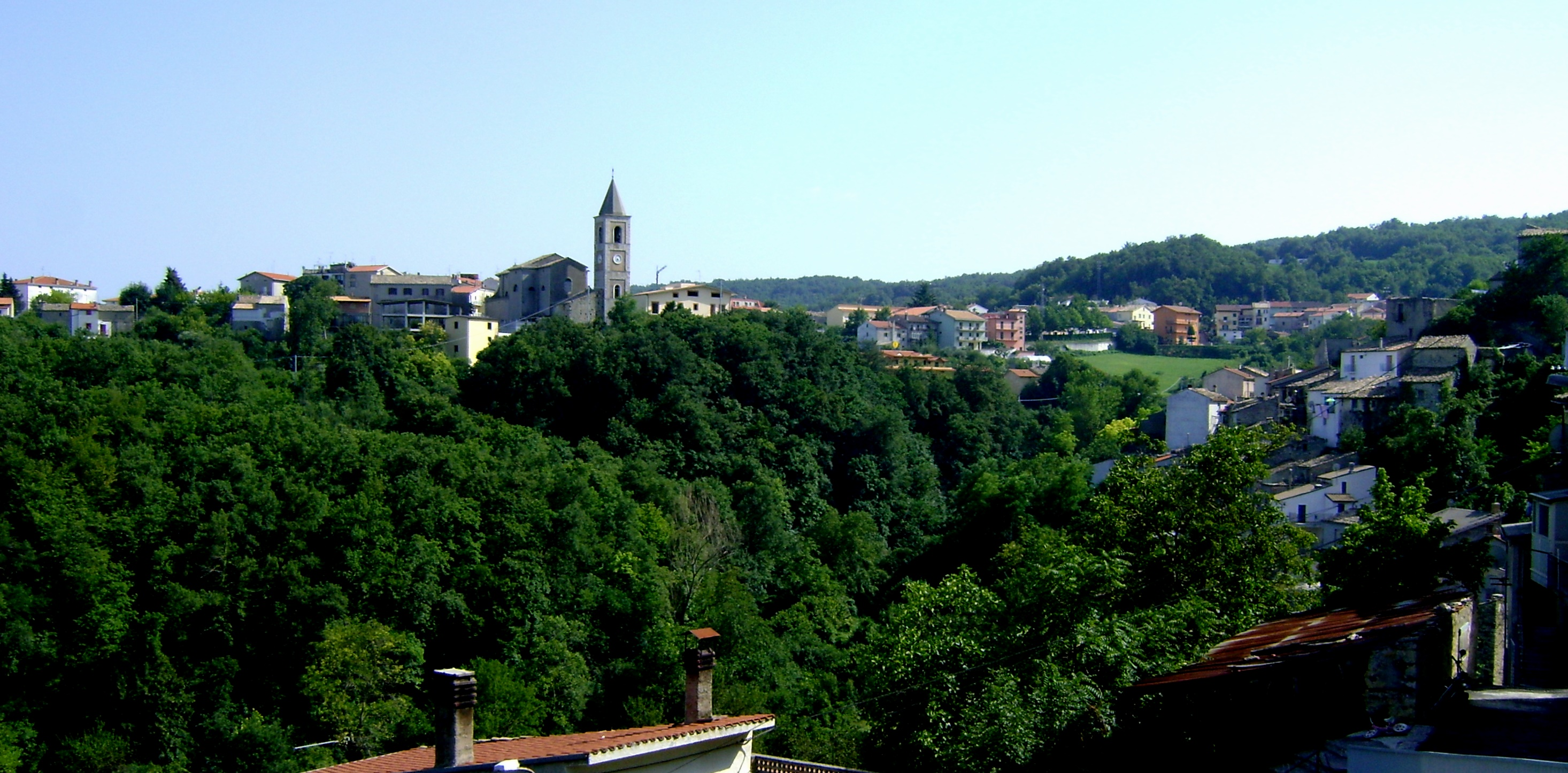
View of Tornareccio

Ground-proofing of the survey data at Acquachiara resulted in the discovery of one important new site as well as the validation and characterization of a site identified through survey. The first, excavated in 2002 was part of an imperial farm complex that was engaged both in industrial or agricultural processing, and in commercial redistribution of some of the products, as shown by the volume calibration marks on the sides of the storage vessels. The second site, found in 2004, contains a rare and still mysterious agricultural processing site. These sites will add substantially to discussion of the nature of rural settlement and its development across time, which was still poorly understood in the Abruzzo. The archaeobotanical and faunal evidence from both sites is suggestive both of correlation with wider known trends and of an unusual diversity of cultivars being processed.

=== Tornareccio Phase (III) (2010-2017) ===
The new excavations, led by archaeologists at Oberlin, instigated the official third phase of the Sangro Valley Project. The new site in the Middle Valley at San Giovanni (Tornareccio), began its excavation in 2011. In 2012, the SVP continued work in the Middle Valley and began a new survey and excavation project at Opi in the Upper Valley, the latter directed by Rob Witcher of Durham University in collaboration with Nicholas Wolff of Boston University. This phase was unique in that it was one of the earliest major excavations to adopt an all digital "paperless archaeology" system. According to the abstract for an article by Motz and Carrier, the Sangro Valley Project “developed an integrated paperless recording system in FileMaker on both laptop computers and iPads.” Data was directly entered into “the digital database (an unlocked public version of this database has been made available at www.paperlessarchaeology.com to assist others in developing similar systems).”

Excavations at Acquachiara and San Giovanni di Tornareccio continued in 2016, and the project concluded in 2017 with final excavations at San Giovanni di Tornareccio.

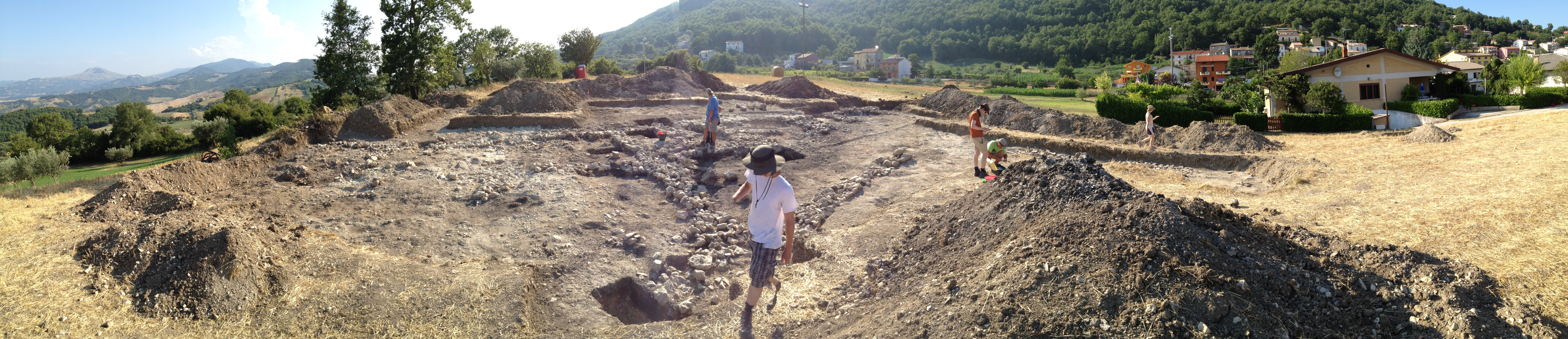
Panoramic view of the 2013 excavation site in Tornareccio.

== Notable publications ==
- Bell, T., Wilson, A. & Wickham, A. 2002. "Tracking the Samnites: Landscape and Communications Routes in the Sangro Valley, Italy" American Journal of Archaeology 106:169-186.
- Bispham, E.H. 2007. "The Samnites" 179-223 in Bradley, G.J, Isayev, E. and Riva, C., Ancient Italy. Regions without Boundaries (Exeter: Exeter University Press).
- Bispham, E.H., Bradley, G.J., Hawthorne, J.W.J. & Kane, S. 2000. "Towards a Phenomenology of Samnite Fortified Centres" Antiquity 74:23-24.
- Bispham, E., Swift, K. & Wolff, N. 2008. "'What lies beneath': ploughsoil assemblages, the dynamics of taphonomy and the interpretation of field survey data" 53-76 in Lock, G. & Faustoferri, A., eds. Archaeology and landscape in Central Italy: papers in memory of John A. Lloyd, (Oxford: Oxford University School of Archaeology: Monographs 69).
- Carrier, S., Amamyia, M. & Kane, S. 2010. "A 3-dimensional Reconstruction of a Hellenistic Terracotta Plaque." 463-468 in Niccolucci, F. & S. Hermon (eds), Beyond the artefact – Digital Interpretation of the Past – Proceedings of CAA2004 – Prato 13–17 April 2004. (Budapest: Archaeolingua).
- Countryman, J.R., Carrier, S.C. & Kane, S. 2011. "Predictive Modelling: a Case Study of Agricultural Terraces at Monte Pallano (Abruzzo, Italy)." CAA2011 - Revive the Past: 39th Conference in Computer Applications and Quantitative Methods in Archaeology, Beijing, China. 12–16 April 2011.
- Faustoferri, A. 2003. "Prima dei Sanniti: le necropoliTerraces at Monte Pallano (Abruzzo, Italy)s dell'Abruzzo meridionale" MEFRA 115: 85-107.
- Faustoferri, A. 2008. "The archaeological park of Monte Pallano, Abruzzo: a work in progress" 77-91 in Lock, G. & Faustoferri, A., eds. Archaeology and landscape in Central Italy: papers in memory of John A. Lloyd (Oxford: Oxford University School of Archaeology: Monographs 69)
- Faustoferri, A. & Lloyd, J. 1998. "Monte Pallano: a Samnite Fortified Centre and its Hinterland" Journal of Roman Archaeology 11:5-22.
- Faustoferri, A. & Riccitelli, P. 2005. "Monte Pallano: l'urbanistica di un insediamento italico d'altura" 871-881 in vol. II P. Attema, A. Nijboer & A. Zifferero, eds., Communities and Settlements from the Neolithic to the Early Medieval Period, Papers in Italian Archaeology VI, BAR International Series 1452.
- Jones, H., ed, 2004. Samnium: Settlement and Cultural Change (The Proceedings of the Third E. Togo Salmon Conference on Roman Studies, Archaeologica Transatlantica XXII) Center for Old World Archaeology and Art, Brown University.
- Kane, S. 2002. "Terracotta Dolphin Plaques from Monte Pallano (Abruzzo)" 176 - 180 in Edlund-Berry, I., Greco, G. & Kenfield, J. 2006. Deliciae Fictiles III: Architectural Terracottas in Ancient Italy: New Discoveries and Interpretations (Proceedings of a conference held at the American Academy in Rome, November 7–8, 2002) (Oxford: Oxbow).
- Kane, S. 2008. "Life 'on the edge': a view from the Abruzzo" 93-103 in Lock, G. & Faustoferri, A., eds. Archaeology and landscape in Central Italy: papers in memory of John A. Lloyd, (Oxford: Oxford University School of Archaeology: Monographs 69).
- Lee, S. 1998. Fluvial Responses to Holocene Environmental Change in Abruzzo, Central Italy (Masters thesis, Jesus College, Oxford University).
- Lloyd, J. et al. 1996. Interim report at: https://web.archive.org/web/20090524035717/http://www.arch.ox.ac.uk/research/research_projects/sangro
- Lloyd, J. et al. 1998. Interim report at: https://web.archive.org/web/20090524035717/http://www.arch.ox.ac.uk/research/research_projects/sangro
- Lloyd, J.A., Lock, G. & Christie, N. 1997. "From the Mountain to the Plain: Landscape Evolution in the Abruzzo. An Interim Report on the Sangro Valley Project (1994-95)" PBSR 65:1-57.
- Lock, G., Bell, T & Lloyd, J. 1999. "Towards a Methodology for Modeling Surface Survey Data: the Sangro Valley Project" 55-63 in M. Gillings, D. Mattingly, J. van Dalen, Geographical Information Systems and Landscape Archeology. Oxford: Oxbow Books.
- Lock, G. 2008. "Change and continuity in surface survey data: exploring thresholds in the Sangro Valley, Italy" 33-45 in Lock, G. & Faustoferri, A., eds. Archaeology and landscape in Central Italy: papers in memory of John A. Lloyd, Oxford: Oxford University School of Archaeology: Monographs 69.
- Lock, G. & Faustoferri, A., eds. 2008. Archaeology and landscape in Central Italy: papers in memory of John A. Lloyd (Oxford: Oxford University School of Archaeology: Monographs 69).
- Motz, C.F. & Carrier, S.C. 2012. "Paperless Recording at the Sangro Valley Project." Computer Applications and Quantitative Methods in Archaeology (CAA) 2012, Southampton, England. 26–30 March 2012.
- Schneider, K. 2008. "Slicing Abruzzo history in Nannoseconds" 47-51 in Lock, G. & Faustoferri, A., eds. Archaeology and landscape in Central Italy: papers in memory of John A. Lloyd (Oxford: Oxford University School of Archaeology: Monographs 69)
- Shelton, C. 2009. Food, Economy, and Identity in the Sangro River Valley, Abruzzo, Italy 650 B.C.-A.D. 150 Ph.D. Dissertation, Boston University.
