= Intraurban Sanctuary of Demeter and Persephone at Cyrene, Libya =

Temple of Persephone

The Intraurban Sanctuary of Demeter and Persephone was an intraurban sanctuary in ancient Cyrene in Libya, dedicated to Demeter and Persephone.

The sanctuary was located on the north-west edge of the agora. It was founded in 7th-century BC, and the predecessor of the larger and more monumental Extramural Sanctuary of Demeter and Persephone at Cyrene, Libya, which was founded somewhat later. Initially, it was a small temple, hypaethral, and consisting of a peribolos wall and two altars. In the 6th century BC, the temenos of the temple was enlarged until it surrounded an area of about 13×13 metres. The Intraurban Sanctuary was used at least until the Extramural Sanctuary was completed and fully operational.

== Sources ==
- Susan-Marie Cronkite, The Sanctuary of Demeter at Mytilene: A Diachronic and Contextual Study. Volume Two Catalogue, 1997, Institute of Archaeology, University College London
- Bacchiefli, Lidiano, 1981. VA, gora di Cirene H lp 27–39. Rome: LTrma di 'Bretschneider Monografle di Archaeologia Libica XV.
