= Extramural Sanctuary of Demeter and Persephone, Cyrene =

Extramural Sanctuary of Demeter and Persephone
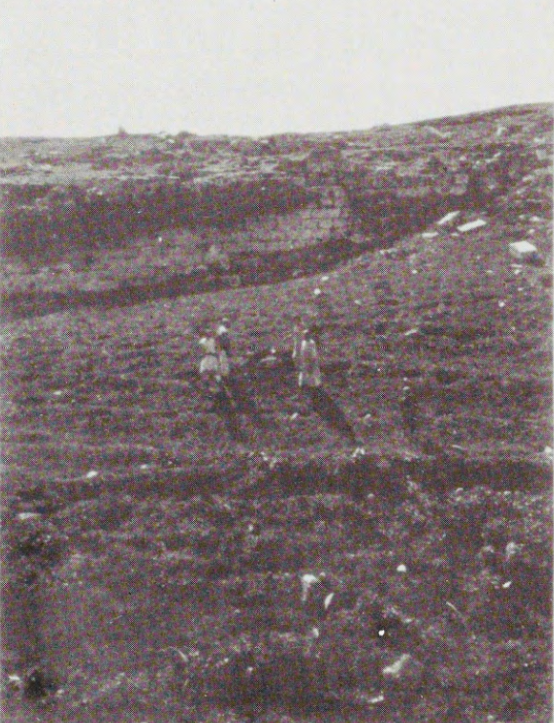

General information
- Type: Sanctuary
- Architectural style: Early Battiad (620-500 BC), Late Battiad (500-440 BC, Republican (Ptolemaic) Period (440-330 BC), Hellenistic/Roman Period (330-31 BC)
- Location: Cyrene, Libya
- Coordinates: 32.82778°N 21.86222°E
- Construction started: Late 7th century BC
- Completed: 31 BC abandonment of sanctuary use
- Owner: Libya

The Extramural Sanctuary of Demeter and Persephone at Cyrene, Libya is located on a coastal plateau of Libya, beyond the boundaries of the city (extramural). In approximately 630 BC Greeks from the island of Thera colonized Cyrene. Other Greek colonists not long after increased the population, thus transforming Cyrene into what was regarded as both the largest and wealthiest Greek colony of North Africa. Archaeological excavations of Cyrene's Extramural Sanctuary of Demeter and Persephone, also known as Kore, daughter of Demeter and legendary Queen of the Underworld and consort of Hades, began in 1969 under the sponsorship of the University of Michigan. Between 1973 and 1981 the University of Pennsylvania Museum of Archeology and Anthropology continued the excavations at Cyrene under the direction of Professor Donald White (Museum Curator Emeritus, Mediterranean Section). Following the renewal of relations between Libya and the United States in 2004, the Cyrenaica Archaeological Project (CAP), under the direction of Professor Susan Kane of Oberlin College, was granted permission to resume the work of its predecessors.

The grounds of the Sanctuary to Demeter and Persephone, which include a temple and theater complex, elevate on terraces across the slope of a ravine, specifically the wadi (Arabic: وادي wādī; also: Vadi) bel Gadir, southwest of the walled city. The Sanctuary comprised structures sprawled out over twenty miles and divided into three primary structures: the Lower, Middle and Upper Sanctuaries. The archaeological remains of the walled complex span approximately 850 years of religious activity, dating from ca. 600 BC through the mid third century AD. During the time of this sacred activity at the Sanctuary a voluminous amount of votive material was accumulated in its interior: pottery, lamps, coinage, stone sculpture, jewellery, inscriptions, glass, as well as bronze and terracotta figurines. The pottery excavated at the Sanctuary does provide useful evidence concerning both the question of its foundation and type of religious activity.

== Architecture ==
The Extramural Sanctuary was in use from the late 7th century BC until 4th century AD. The principal epochs of sanctuary architecture took shape in the background of monumental events in the history of Cyrene (parent city). During the Sanctuary's four phases, it underwent significant internal change, but still characteristically remained an extramural hillside precinct enclosing a variety of independent(?) cultic installations. The major concessions to its rather steep-rise setting involve organizing the sloping hillside into a series of terraced zones which are themselves organized (over time) into three separately defined architectural zones: the Upper, Middle, and Lower Sanctuaries.

Enough architectural evidence remains from the late Battiad period to show that the Upper and Middle sections already existed at that time. Although the identity of the Upper Sanctuary's Classical buildings remains mostly uncertain until as late as the Hellenistic period, evidence for cult activity on this level is good. The Sanctuary's expansion north or down the wadi slope to the level of the Lower Sanctuary did not occur until the early Imperial period when both the Upper and the Lower Sanctuary levels take on the architectural features of what henceforth remain their characteristic layouts until the earthquake of 262 AD. Most of the site's architectural limestone and marble frusta located scattered throughout the earthquake levels across the Middle Sanctuary appears to have originated with the Imperial period Upper Sanctuary additions. It is these additions which furnish most of the Sanctuary's restorable monuments. Moreover, although most of the surviving evidence for building activity down to the end of the Hellenistic period pertains to the Middle Sanctuary, in years leading up to the Sanctuary's earthquake destructions in the 3rd and 4th centuries, only a few new architectural endeavours were undertaken, mainly at the Upper Sanctuary level.

== Religious aspects ==
This space embodied the countryside's sacred aspects, as a space by which urbanity (city) is severed from the world of nature. However, the Sanctuary also functioned as a realm of inclusiveness, i.e. through its festivals, rituals, and cults. More generally, the sacred precinct (Sanctuary) served as a platform and occasion for civic union, expression and for building communicable relations with the peoples of the surrounding area. One such occasion was the Thesmophoria, an agricultural festival known to have been celebrated at Cyrene in honor of Demeter and Persephone.

== Pottery ==
MAP: Mercantile and Relevant Sites of the Sanctuary
- Current status: Active

Site Plan
- Current status: Active

Of the imported archaic Greek objects unearthed at the Extramural Sanctuary of Demeter and Persephone Corinthian pottery represents a rather sizable portion, of which the majority belongs to the Late Corinthian I and II periods. Archaeological excavators expected the examination of the Corinthian pottery to yield concrete evidence concerning the resolution of the chronological question of the foundation of the Sanctuary, but for one reason it later proved that the answer did not rest in the pottery: the surviving pottery's poor state of preservation. However, the pottery does furnish important information regarding the Sanctuary from primarily social, religious, historical and economic perspectives.

Given the contemporary evidence of Greek pottery, the Sanctuary itself appears to succeed the settlement of Cyrene, traditionally dated to circa 630 BCE, by approximately one generation. However, because earlier Corinthian pottery also suggests an establishment date for the Sanctuary somewhat thirty years after 630 BCE, the absolute date is uncertain. The range and number of pottery finds during the first quarter of the sixth century increases substantially, thus indicating that by this time the Sanctuary was already firmly established. Specifically, based on the Corinthian pottery from the Sanctuary, it is clearly evident that less expensive commodities were continuously imported. Such importation provides evidence that cheaper commodities were still seeking an overseas market (see map: Mercantile and Relevant Sites of the Sanctuary above). It is possible that this "cheaper" market stemmed from the needs of the less affluent inhabitants of Cyrene. Furthermore, excluding evidence for "cheaper" markets, artifacts from the Sanctuary also provide information about the local elites' interests in trade and commerce, as Corinthian black-figure pottery, some of the finest products of Corinthian workshops, were abundantly imported into Cyrene. Thus, based on these observations, conclusions drawn by the earlier study of the East Greek, Island and Laconian pottery, particularly kraters (in Greek: κρατήρ, kratēr, from the verb κεράννυμι, keránnymi, "to mix"), that Cyrene avoided Persian attack circa 515 BCE, were confirmed upon careful examination of the Corinthian pottery.

In addition, Professors Donald White and Gerald Schaus have discussed in detail the question of ritual feasting or dining at the Sanctuary, but Corinthian pottery does not supply conclusive evidence for or against the rituals. However, of the imported pottery vases, minimal observations of two exclusive types may provide some insight concerning this ongoing issue: vases associated with personal use (perfumed-oil containers, small boxes, etc.) and those with wine, its preparation, serving and consumption (kraters, cups, and oinochoai). The pottery vases categorized as having a personal use may have served as dedications to Persephone and her divine mother (Demeter). Moreover, one-third of all finds unearthed at the Sanctuary, namely kotylai and black-glazed hydriai (both are known to possess cultic associations with Demeter), serve in some form or fashion as votive objects. In short, more than half of all the Corinthian pottery imports appear to have almost certainly functioned as dedicatory gifts to the mother-daughter deities. In contrast to these vases, the vases directly related to the consumption of wine could have also served a practical purpose. Half of all the whole-sized pottery finds, particularly those in association with wine mixing and pouring vases, suggest ritual drinking. On a rather different note, these finds, i.e. the artifacts specifically concerned with the preparation and consumption of wine, also have an immediate literary relevance. For example, in the Homeric Hymn to Demeter, a celebratory song hymned in honor of the grain goddess (Demeter), Demeter expresses her unwillingness to drink wine until it has been "mixed" with a concoction of mint, water and barley (II.205-210). Thus, although there exists a lack of indisputable evidence proving ritual drinking took place at the Sanctuary, it is nonetheless highly plausible that cups and like vases were left as dedicatory votives after the ritual feast.

== See also ==
- Intraurban Sanctuary of Demeter and Persephone at Cyrene, Libya
