= John Lloyd (archaeologist) =

British archaeologist

John Lloyd (29 April 1948 - 30 May 1999) was a British classical archaeologist.

== Early life and education ==
Lloyd was born in Broughty Ferry, Scotland on 29 April 1948. He read English at the University of Manchester, but became interested in archaeology by volunteering at excavations led by Barri Jones, a professor of archaeology at Manchester, in Northeast England and Wales.

== Career ==
While working at Cambridge University Press as a trainee editor upon graduation, Lloyd spent his spare time at excavations. During a project in Benghazi in 1972, the Society for Libyan Studies asked him to become the field director for their excavations at Sidi Khrebish.

Lloyd became a lecturer in classical archaeology at the University of Sheffield in 1977. He left Sheffield for the Institute of Archaeology at Oxford University in 1988 and became a fellow of Wolfson College, Oxford. In 1994 Lloyd, alongside fellow Oxford archaeologist Gary Lock and others, initiated the Sangro Valley Project, an archaeological excavation in Abruzzo, Italy. He also held various leadership roles in the British School at Rome, editing several editions of its Papers and numerous monographs as chairman of its publication committees.

== Personal life ==
Lloyd married Vicky Doughty in 1976, they had one son and one daughter. On 30 May 1999, Lloyd died of a brain tumour in Oxford.
