= Mordecai Najar =

15th-century rabbi

Mordecai Najar was a rabbi in the Kingdom of Majorca in the first half of the 15th century, a contemporary of Simon ben Ẓemaḥ Duran, who answered some of his questions in Tashbaẓ (part i., Nos. 119, 173-174; part ii., Nos. 141, 225-232).

== Jewish Encyclopedia bibliography ==
- Azulai, Shem ha-Gedolim, i.91, No. 86;
- Fürst, Bibl. Jud. iii.12.
