= Moses Ventura =

Moses ben Joseph Ventura (called also Ventura of Tivoli and Ventura of Jerusalem) was rabbi of Silistria, Bulgaria, in the latter half of the 16th century. He was educated at Jerusalem, but later settled in Silistria. Ventura was the author of Yemin Mosheh (Mantua, 1624; 2d ed., Amsterdam, 1718; 3d ed., The Hague, 1777), a commentary on the Shulḥan 'Aruk, Yoreh De'ah. Aaron Alfandari, in his commentary entitled Yad Aharon, ascribes to him the Haggahot we-Hassagot 'al Bet Yosef, a commentary, as yet unpublished (ca. 1906), on the four parts of the Bet Yosef.

== Jewish Encyclopedia bibliography ==
- Steinschneider, Cat. Bodl. col. 2008;
- Benjacob, Oẓar ha-Sefarim, p. 224;
- Fürst, Bibl. Jud. iii.433.
