= Levi Najara =

Spanish rabbi who emigrated to Mamluk Palestine in 1492

Personal life
- Born: Spain
- Children: Moses Najara I
- Known for: Emigrating to Mamluk Palestine in 1492
- Occupation: Rabbi

Religious life
- Religion: Judaism

Levi Najara was a Spanish rabbi who emigrated in 1492 to Mamluk Palestine, probably to Safed. He was the father of Moses Najara I.
