= Tornareccio =

- Comune
- Comune di Tornareccio
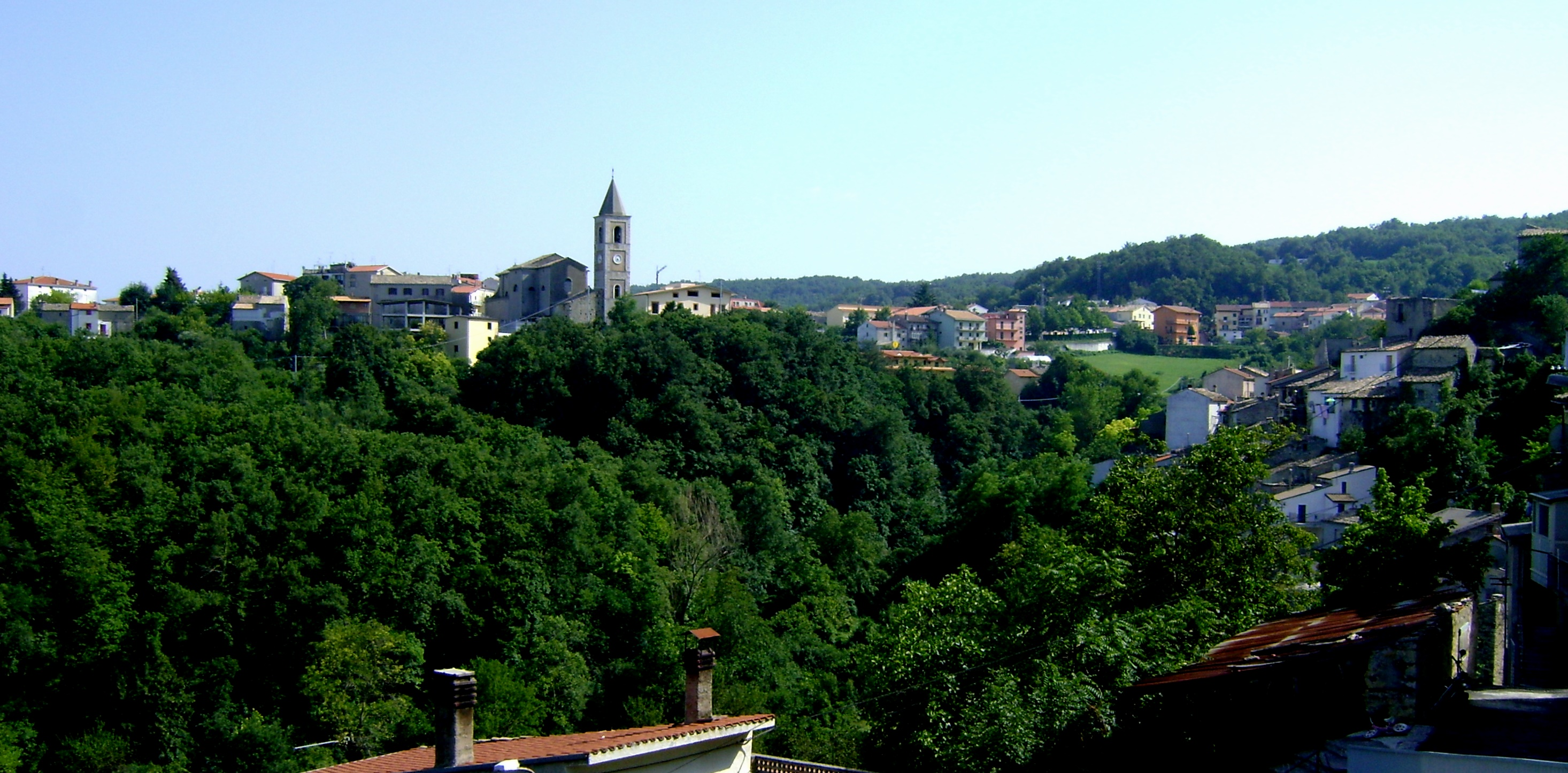

- Location within Italy Location within Abruzzo
- Coordinates: 42°2′N 14°25′E
- Country: Italy
- Region: Abruzzo
- Province: Chieti (CH)
- Frazioni: Collecase, San Giovanni, Torricchio

Government
  - Mayor: Remo Fioriti

Area
  - Total: 27.53 km^{2} (10.63 sq mi)
- Elevation: 630 m (2,070 ft)

Population (31 March 2017)
  - Total: 1,800
  - Density: 65/km^{2} (170/sq mi)
- Demonym: Tornarecciani
- Time zone: UTC+1 (CET)
  - Summer (DST): UTC+2 (CEST)
- Postal code: 66046
- Dialing code: 0872
- Patron saint: St. Victoria
- Saint day: 23 December
- Website: Official website

Tornareccio (Abruzzese: Turnarécce) is a comune and town in the province of Chieti in the Abruzzo region of Italy, known for its apiaries and archaeological significance. It is the site of phase III of the Sangro Valley Project.

== History ==
The area around Tornareccio adjacent to Mount Pallano has been inhabited since the Palaeolithic, around 20,000 years ago. The first written document which mentions Tornareccio dates to 829, when it came under the fiefdom of the Abbey of Farfa.
