= David Najar =

Tunisian rabbinical writer

David Najar was a rabbinical writer of Tunis, where he died at the beginning of the nineteenth century. He was the author of Ẓemaḥ Dawid, which was published after his death, together with the Admat Yehudah of Judah Cohen Tanugi (Leghorn, 1828), and which contains novellæ to some tractates of the Talmud and to some parts of Maimonides' Yad.

== Jewish Encyclopedia bibliography ==
- David Cazès, Notes Bibliographiques sur la Littérature Juive Tunisienne, p. 260.
