= Leser Landshuth =

German-Jewish liturgiologist (1817–1887)

- Born: Elieser ben Meir Landshuth; 15 January 1817; Lissa, Posen
- Died: 23 March 1887 (aged 70); Berlin, Prussia, Germany

Leser Landshuth (15 January 1817 – 23 March 1887) was a German Jewish liturgiologist.

He went to Berlin as a youth to study Jewish theology, and there he became acquainted with Leopold Zunz and Abraham Geiger, the latter of whom was then staying in that city in order to become naturalized in Prussia. Landshuth soon gave up his intention of becoming a rabbi, not being willing to conceal or renounce his liberal opinions; and Moritz Veit aided him in establishing himself as a Hebrew bookseller.

Meanwhile, Landshuth kept up his literary activity; and in 1845 he published as an appendix to the prayer-book issued by Hirsch Edelmann ("Siddur Hegyon Leb"; commonly known as "Landshuth's Prayer-Book") an essay on the origin of Hebrew prayers. His essay on the Haggadah (Berlin, 1855) and the introduction to Aaron Berechiah's Ma'abar Yabboq, a handbook of the funeral customs of the Jews, are along similar lines ("Vollständiges Gebet- und Andachtsbuch zum Gebrauche bei Kranken und Sterbenden," Berlin, 1867). A number of inscriptions from the tombstones of prominent men are added to the latter work.

Landshuth's chief work was his "'Ammude ha'Abodah (Columnæ Cultus): Onomasticum Auctorum Hymnorum Hebræorum cum Notis Biographicis et Bibliographicis," on Hebrew liturgical poetry (2 vols., ib. 1857–62), a painstaking and important contribution to the subject. No less valuable are his works relating to the history of the Jewish community of Berlin, parts of which have been incorporated in Ludwig Geiger's "Geschichte der Juden in Berlin" (ib. 1871); other portions have been published in Die Gegenwart (ib. 1867) and other periodicals. He published also "Toledot Anshe ha-Shem u-Fe'ulatam," history of the Berlin rabbis 1671–1871 (ib. 1884). Many valuable manuscript notes by Landshuth passed into the possession of Salomon Neumann of Berlin; and other matter was reprinted by Simon Bernfeld from Landshuth's notes in Ha-Melitz, 1886.

Landshuth also copied and arranged the early communal archives of Berlin (written in Hebrew) and the inscriptions of the old cemetery in that city, which was closed in 1827.
