= Najerilla =

River in Spain

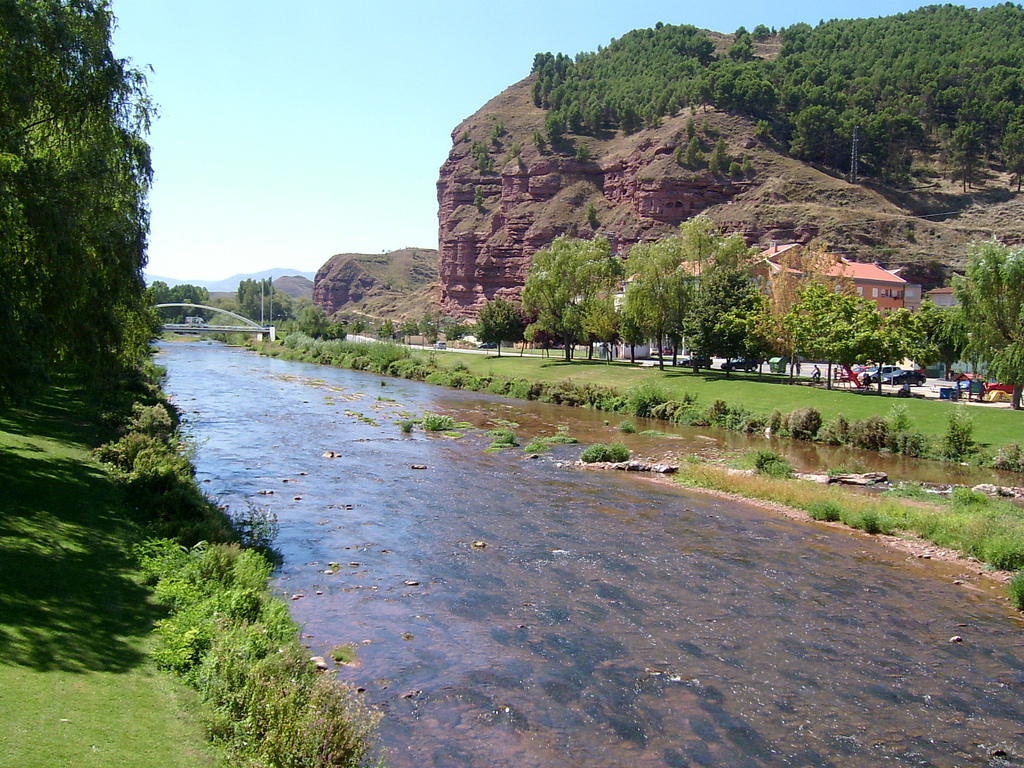
- The river Najerilla near Nájera
- Native name: Río Najerilla (Spanish)

Location
- Country: Spain
- Region: Castile and León, La Rioja

Physical characteristics
- Length: 99.7 km (62.0 mi)
- Discharge
  - average: 16.45 m^{3}/s (581 cu ft/s)

Basin features
- Progression: Ebro→ Balearic Sea

The river Najerilla is a tributary of the river Ebro, Spain's most voluminous river. The Najerilla rises in the province of Burgos and then flows through La Rioja.

== Archaeology ==
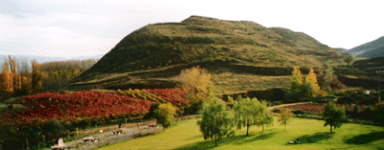
Cerro Molino

The valley has been inhabited since prehistoric times. Two Iron Age hilltop settlements, Castillo Antiguo and Cerro Molino (near Hormilleja), have been excavated. They have been described as straddling "the interface between the Celtiberian heartland of central Iberia and the Atlantic zone of the Bay of Biscay".

== Viticulture ==
La Rioja is one of Spain's main wine regions, and some of its vineyards are in the Najerilla valley.
