= Archaeology of Australia =

Australian archaeology is a large sub-field in the discipline of archaeology. Archaeology in Australia takes four main forms: Aboriginal archaeology (the archaeology of Aboriginal and Torres Strait Islander peoples in Australia before and after European settlement), historical archaeology (the archaeology of Australia after European settlement), maritime archaeology, and the archaeology of the contemporary past (after World War II). Bridging these sub-disciplines is the important concept of cultural heritage management, which encompasses Aboriginal and Torres Strait Islander sites, historical sites, and maritime sites.

== Research and investigations ==
Archaeological studies or investigations of Aboriginal and Torres Strait Islander people and culture in Australia have had many different agendas through time. Initial archaeological investigation was often focused on finding the oldest sites. By the 1970s, archaeological research was also concerned with the environment and the way it impacted on humans. In the late 1970s cultural heritage management gained prominence, with the increasing demands by Australian Aboriginal and Torres Strait Islander groups for representation in archaeological research. At a research level, the focus shifted to cultural change of Australian Aboriginal and Torres Strait Islander people through time.

Currently, archaeological research places great importance on Australian Aboriginal and Torres Strait Islander people's viewpoints on the land and history of Australia. Consideration is given to Australian Aboriginal and Torres Strait Islander people's belief that archaeological sites are not just capsules of the past but a continuation from the past to the present. Therefore, at a research level, significance is placed not only the past but also on the importance of the present.

The first settlement of Australia is a popular research topic both in archaeology and in the public arena. There is consensus that no human or closely related species evolved independently in Australia. This is because there have been no species of primate found in Australia, either in the present or in the fossil record. It is therefore assumed that the first settlers of Australia came from outside. At present, the fossil record suggests that the first settlers were Homo sapiens, or fully anatomically modern humans.

There is controversy over where the first Australian Aboriginal and Torres Strait Islander people originated. Both of the two main theories postulate that the first settlers were fully anatomically modern humans. Asian genetic studies have demonstrated that there are similarities between Australian Aboriginal and Torres Strait Islander people, Melanesians and Indians. However, the suggested date of 60,000 years ago for initial settlement is quite early when compared to other areas of the world.

The first settlement of Australia most likely occurred during the last glacial maximum. During this time Australia, New Guinea, the Aru Islands, and Tasmania were joined as a single land mass called Sahul. The south-east Asian continent and islands were also joined as a single land mass called Sunda. It is theorized that the first Australians crossed the sea between Sahul and Sunda about 60,000 to 40,000 years ago. Other dates have been suggested, and this timeframe is not seen as conclusive. Sunda and Sahul had a permanent water-crossing, meaning that the first Australian Aboriginal and Torres Strait Islander people had to make a crossing on the open sea (see Wallace Line).

Sahul is important in that in the past Australia (including Tasmania) was not an isolated continent, but was joined with New Guinea and the Aru Islands. New Guinea and the Aru Islands have also been the focus of archaeological investigations by Australian researchers.

The most important early sites in Australia are:

- Nauwalabila I (55,000 – 60,000 years old)
- Madjedbebe (65,000 years ago)
- Devil's Lair (45,000 years old)
- Lake Mungo (61,000 or 40,000 years old) – controversy exists over precise dating (see below)
- Warratyi (49,000 years old)

Rising sea levels at the beginning of the Holocene mean that the first settlements located on the coast would later have been submerged.

With the settlement of Australia, it is most probable that Australian Aboriginal and Torres Strait Islander people first settled on the northern coast, as this is the area closest to Asia. However, the actual spread of people and the settlement of the continent is debated, with three major models put forward:

- Concentric dispersal through the entire continent through one single "entry" point.
- Coastal dispersal by spreading along the coastline and later entering inland areas, mainly via the major waterways.
- Fluctuating colonization in and out of different environmental zones. For example, in plentiful years the population would occupy semi-arid regions, but in drought would move to areas with better resources.

=== Controversies in Aboriginal archaeology ===
==== Date of arrival ====
There is significant debate over the date of arrival of Aboriginal and Torres Strait Islander people into the Australian continent. Until the 1950s, it was often believed that arrival of the first Aboriginal people was within the last 10,000 years. In the 1950s, the dates were extended to the last Ice Age, based upon falling sea-levels at that period and the existence of landbridges linking the islands of the Sunda Shelf and the Sahul Continental Shelf with Australia, New Guinea, the Aru Islands, and Tasmania. The discovery and use of carbon-14 dating extended the dating to 40,000 years at Lake Mungo, and this was the date most frequently given. However, more recently, the analysis of sea levels has shown that coastlines 40,000 years ago were not as exposed as they were 60,000 to 70,000 years ago. The submergence of the earliest sites of occupation due to rising sea levels has meant that the earliest archaeological signature may in fact represent occupation much later than the initial time of arrival. The difficulty in establishing a date of arrival earlier than 50,000 years has been compounded by the widespread use of radiocarbon dating and the supposed "radiocarbon barrier" which establishes 40,000 years as a limit to which carbon-14 dates can be easily and reliably extracted. This limitation has prompted many archaeologists, including Rhys Jones and Alan Thorne, to include thermoluminescence dating methods in their studies of early occupation sites. It is argued that 60,000 to 70,000 years best fits the evidence from the Human genome diversity project and a number of other new dating technologies. Some have proposed dates extending back 100,000 to 120,000 years, but these dates are criticised on technical grounds and are not accepted by most scientists. A recent study by Eske Willesev of the University of Copenhagen, of the genome of an Aboriginal man from the Western Australian Goldfields confirms that the Aboriginal population separated from the early human stock 70,000 years ago, in Africa or from Oman, and travelled fairly rapidly across south and south eastern Asia to arrive in Australia at least 50,000 years ago, before a second wave travelled into Europe and Asia, receiving some input from the Aboriginal people who had already made that journey.

==== Multiple arrivals ====
Earlier anthropologists believed that there were "three waves" of arrival of Aboriginal and Torres Strait Islander people to Australia, the first being the "negrito" Tasmanian people, who were displaced by "Murrayans", who in turn were considered to be displaced by "Carpentarians". These theories were sometimes advocated to disprove the Aboriginal claim to being the indigenous "first peoples", and are no longer accepted by archaeologists. The finding of a robust skeleton with surprisingly so-called "primitive" features at Kow Swamp was also advocated as proof of an earlier wave of settlers to the continent. Dating of the Kow Swamp material, however, showed that rather than being earlier, it was in fact a lot more recent than the nearby Mungo gracile skeletons that more closely resembled modern Australian Aboriginal and Torres Strait Islander people. Today it is thought that Aboriginal people throughout the continent are descendants of an original founder population, although this does not completely exclude some contribution from later arrivals.

For example, on the basis of genomic analysis, it has been found that 4000–5000 years ago a small band from the Indian sub-continent traveled to northern Australia and contributed to the genome of people living in the north. At that time the appearance of the backed blade tradition, the dingo and other cultural features have been attributed to the arrivals. Nevertheless, it now appears that rather than a connection with the Indian pariah dogs, as previously thought, the dingo shows a greater connection to the dogs of East Asia, and the genetic bottleneck through which they passed may have been due to a single pregnant female, introduced through Austronesian connections 5,000 years ago.

==== Megafauna extinction ====
Some researchers, such as Tim Flannery, have put forward the idea that human settlement was responsible for the large climatic and environmental changes that occurred in Australia.

The extent and causes of the Australian megafaunal extinction—generally placed in the Late Pleistocene—continues as an active debate and is a preoccupation among archaeologists and paleontologists working in the Australian scene. Besides ongoing attempts to refine the dating and extent of the extinction event(s), much research is actively directed towards establishing whether, or to what extent, anthropogenic effects played a part in the disappearance of dozens of species of large-bodied animals formerly inhabiting the continent. Central to this question is a determination of how long humans and the megafauna species coexisted. Many factors have been considered as possible causes of the extinction, ranging from environmental variables to entirely human-based activity.

The most extreme theory is that Australian Aboriginal and Torres Strait Islander people were completely responsible for the extinction of these animals through extensive hunting. This theory is largely based on the overkill hypothesis of the Americas, where hunters travelled through the land exterminating megafauna. The overkill hypothesis is largely discredited (and not just in Australia), as there have been no confirmed discoveries of kill sites, sites that are found in other contexts around the world and associated with megafauna hunting. The sites of Cuddie Springs in New South Wales, and Keilor in Victoria, display some evidence of associations between Aboriginal stone tools and megafauna remains, but do not prove conclusively the overkill theory. Furthermore, the coexistence of Aboriginal populations with the megafauna tends to contradict the overkill hypothesis. These writers suggest "threshold (for megafauna dieoff) was crossed between 26,000 and 15,000 yr B.P. when the arid area expanded further than usual and water resources in the woodland areas were severely reduced", although this finding is disputed by Roberts et al. It is clear from paleobotanical and palaeontological evidence that the extinction coincided with great environmental change. The high-resolution chronology of the changes supports the hypothesis that human hunting alone eliminated the megafauna, and that the subsequent change in flora was most likely a consequence of the elimination of browsers and an increase in fire.

Approximately 18,000 to 7,000 years ago, many societies around the world underwent significant change; in particular, this time marks the rise of agriculture in many Neolithic societies. In the Australian context environmental change did not give rise to the development of agriculture but it may have contributed to the disappearance of populations of animals made even more vulnerable to depletion through hunting and marginalised grazing.

==== Lake Mungo dating ====
Arguably the oldest human remains in Australia, the Lake Mungo 3 skull was given the age of 60,000 years by Gregory Adcock and his researchers. However, this claim has been criticised, largely due to the process used to analyse the skull and the claims regarding the dating and the mtDNA found. Most people suggest that the age of the specimen is approximately 40,000 years. Sensitivities to handling Aboriginal remains means that specimens are not available for further research, so reassessment of the date awaits the development of appropriate ethical protocols.

==== The intensification debate ====
The idea of intensification was put forward by a number of archaeologists, but the most prominent in developing the idea was Harry Lourandos. Intensification is an idea that posits that change in economic systems of peoples is controlled by social changes. This means that change can occur without an external force such as environmental change. The idea is derived from a 1990s debate about the Tasmanian Aboriginal people and whether large social/economic change was caused by environmental factors (see Environmental determinism), or from factors within the society. The predominant view at the time held that in the case of the Australian Aboriginal and Torres Strait Islander people any social change was largely influenced by external, largely environmental, factors.

The evidence that supports this idea is that sites at approximately the same time (around 4,000 years ago) experienced increased usage. This is supported by increased site numbers, increased artefact density and an expansion into new environments. This evidence better explained as an artefact of archaeological research and conflation of independent events, by environmental factors, large population growth, technological change, or post-depositional factors.

==== The cultivation question ====
Kent Flannery's model of the broad spectrum revolution in which foragers diversified the types of food sources harvested, broadening their subsistence base outward to include more fish, small game, water fowl, invertebrates likes snails and shellfish, as well as previously ignored or marginal plant sources, would seem to apply to Australian hunters and gatherers. These changes were linked to climatic changes, including sea level rises during the Flandrian transgression in which:

1. Conditions became more inviting to marine life offshore in shallow, warm waters.
2. Quantity and variety of marine life increased drastically as did the number of edible species.
3. Because the rivers' power weakened with rising waters, and the creation of many estuaries, the currents flowing into the ocean were slow enough to allow fish to ascend upstream to spawn.
4. Birds found refuge next to riverbeds in marsh grasses and then proceeded to migrate to different habitats.

Aboriginal people had a good understanding of local ecologies, and harvested many varieties of plants and animals in season. W.E.Roth talks about driving kangaroos into a 3 sided enclosure of nets "with the assistance of numerous beaters". Wallabies and emus were also caught in a similar way. Wallaroos were hunted with fire and beaten towards a creek, where they were killed with spears and sticks. Animals were also driven towards set nets and fish traps were common.

The degree to which Aboriginal and Torres Strait Islander people on the Australian continent practised agriculture has long been debated by archaeologists. Earlier it was believed that Australian Aboriginal people were ignorant of the principles of agriculture, but this has since been disproven. For instance, Australian Aboriginal women in traditional societies often transplanted immature "bush tucker" plants found growing in unfavourable locations to more favourable spots. There were also a number of plants (particularly seeds and roots) that could have lent themselves to cultivation, and were used in making such foods as bush bread. Charles Sturt in his 1844 expedition to northwest New South Wales and central Australia reports seeing large haystacks built by Aboriginal people of seed crops. This was located east of Depot Glen Milparinka about 600 km from the Murray River. Firestick farming has also always been a technique used by Aboriginal people to open the canopy of closed canopy forests, introducing sunlight to the ground, and prompting germination of a number of foodstuffs known to attract kangaroo and other marsupials. This would encourage a more intensive land use than otherwise. But the main reason for the lack of agriculture in Australia is the extreme variability of the climate. Australia is the only continent on Earth, which, as a result of the El Nino Southern Oscillation, experiences greater variability between years than it does between the seasons. Such climatic variability makes farming very difficult, especially for incipient farmers who cannot be supported from outside their community. Australian Aboriginal people found that maintaining stable populations below the effective carrying capacity of the environment would enable an adequate supply of food, even in drought years, so maintaining a stable culture. This made hunting and gathering a more sustainable activity on the Australian continent than neolithic farming. Evidence of cultivation at Kuk in Papua New Guinea, from about 10–12,000 years BP (at a time when that island was joined to Australia, suggests crop raising was possible in the Sahul supercontinent when conditions were favourable.

== Historical archaeology in Australia ==
Historical archaeology is the study of the past through material remains such as artefacts (i.e. objects), structures (e.g. standing and ruined buildings, fences, roads), features (e.g. ditches, mounds, canals, landfill), and even whole landscapes modified by human activity and their spatial and stratigraphic contexts.

The origins of historical archaeology in Australia are generally held to lie in archaeological investigations by the late William (Bill) Culican at Fossil Beach in Victoria, in Jim Allen's PhD research at Port Essington in the Northern Territory and in Judy Birmingham's work at Irrawang Pottery in the Hunter Valley of NSW. An increasingly important area of Australian historical archaeology studies the interaction between European and other settlers, and Australian Aboriginal and Torres Strait Islander people.

== Underwater and maritime archaeology in Australia ==
Underwater archaeology is archaeology practised in a submerged environment. It encompasses the pre-historic and historic eras, including post-World War II. Maritime archaeology (the study of humans and their activities in, on, around and under the seas, rivers and estuaries) and nautical archaeology (the specialised study of boat and ship construction) are allied sub-disciplines of archaeology as a whole. Often the sites or relics are not inundated, however.

In mirroring their terrestrial roots, underwater, maritime and nautical archaeology can now include the examination of a wide range of sites ranging from the Indigenous through to industrial archaeology, including historic submerged aircraft. Better known as a sub-discipline of aviation archaeology, underwater aviation archaeology is arguably the most recent offshoot of underwater archaeology, having developed its theoretical underpinnings and a substantial corpus of fieldwork, research and publication work in the late 1990s.

Maritime archaeology, the first of these sub-disciplines to emerge in Australia, commenced under the aegis of Jeremy Green in the 1970s after concerns were expressed by academics and politicians over the rampant destruction of Dutch and British East Indian ships lost on the west coast. After Commonwealth legislation was enacted and enforced after 1976 and the states enacted their own legislation, the sub-discipline spread throughout Australia, as a result of on-going funding by both the states and the Commonwealth. While also encompassing the study of port-related structures (e.g. jetties, anchorages), lighthouses, moorings, defences etc., initially the focus in maritime archaeology was solely on shipwrecks.

Now far broader in its scope, in some states maritime and underwater archaeology is managed by museums and in others by cultural heritage management units. There are also numerous practitioners in private practice, or acting as consultants. All practitioners operate under the aegis of the Australasian Institute for Maritime Archaeology (AIMA).

== Cultural heritage management ==
Commercial or consulting archaeology (also termed cultural heritage management) only developed in earnest in Australia from the 1970s, with the advent of various state legislation requiring approvals for damage or disturbance to archaeological relics, such as the Aboriginal and Archaeological Relics Preservation Act 1972, in Victoria. The Victoria Archaeological Survey was established from the Relics Office in 1975. Historical Archaeology is generally protected by separate legislation, such as the New South Wales Heritage Act 1977, and the various other state counterparts.

Cultural Heritage Management for archaeological sites is seen in the context of wider heritage issues, and follows the principles set out in the Burra Charter or the Australia ICOMOS charter for the conservation of places of cultural significance.

From a handful of practitioners in the 1970s, there are now more than 250 commercially based archaeologists in Australia. Again in Victoria, one of the first to establish was du Cros and associates (later absorbed by Biosis Research, renamed Biosis Pty Ltd in 2012). The Australian Association of Consulting Archaeologist Inc. (AACAI) is the professional body established in 1979 with presently about 50 full members. In New South Wales, companies such as Casey and Lowe and GML have specialised in large scale historical archaeological salvage.

Consultancy archaeology is primarily driven by development, and so is often at the centre of controversy over ownership of heritage and in particular the conflicting objectives of conservation and development. Aboriginal communities often ascribe a special significance to the places where archaeological remains have been found.

=== Legal obligations in Australia ===
Protection and management of archaeology in Australia is controlled by Federal and State Government legislation including the Commonwealth Aboriginal and Torres Strait Islander Heritage Protection Act 1984, The Environment Protection and Biodiversity Conservation Act and the various state archaeological legislation such as Victoria's Heritage Act 1995 (covering historical archaeology) and the Aboriginal Heritage Act 2006. Several states maintain archaeological site inventories as the main management tool. The principle of most forms of archaeological legislation in Australia is to provide blanket protection for all archaeological remains and sites, whether or not they have been recorded, and use a system of permits and consents to control change to those sites. for Aboriginal archaeological sites, there is often a requirement for consultation with traditional owners, and they sometimes have a role in approving works that impact on archaeological sites.

=== Native title and land rights ===
Native title is formalised under The Commonwealth Native Title Act 1993 which establishes a framework for the protection and recognition of native title. The Australian legal system recognises native title where:

- the rights and interests are possessed under traditional laws and customs that continue to be acknowledged and observed by the relevant Aboriginal or Torres Strait Islander people;
- by virtue of those laws and customs, the Aboriginal or Torres Strait Islander people have a connection with the land or waters; and
- the native title rights and interests are recognised by the common law of Australia.

== Notable Australian archaeologists ==
This is an abbreviated list of Australian archaeologists who have made a notable contribution to the development of the subject of Australian archaeology.

- Jim Allen
- Val Attenbrow
- Diane Barwick
- Judy Birmingham
- Jim Bowler
- Vere Gordon Childe
- Peter Coutts
- Roger Cribb
- William (Bill) Culican
- Raymond Dart
- Josephine Flood
- David Frankel
- Sandor (Alexander) Gallus
- Jack Golson
- Laila Haglund
- Peter Hiscock
- Rhys Jones
- Harry Lourandos
- Isabel McBryde
- Betty Meehan
- John Mulvaney
- Tim Murray
- Gary Presland
- Claire Smith
- Arthur Dale Trendall

== Professional societies in Australian archaeology ==
The Australian Archaeological Association is one of the largest and oldest organisations devoted to furthering archaeology of all types within Australia.

The Australasian Society for Historical Archaeology (ASHA) founded as the Australian Society for Historical Archaeology in 1970. Its aims were, and still are, to promote the study of historical archaeology in Australia.

The Australian Association of Consulting Archaeologists Inc. was founded in 1979 and aims to promote and represent professional archaeologists.

The Archaeological and Anthropological Society of Victoria (AASV) is predominantly a non-professional organisation, which was formed in 1976 in through the amalgamation of two earlier societies, the Anthropological Society of Victoria formed in 1934, and the Archaeological Society of Victoria formed in 1964.

== Notable sites ==
- Baiame's Cave – Creator god and sky father in Australian Aboriginal mythology
- Ban Ban Springs – Place in Queensland, Australia
- Budj Bim heritage areas – UNESCO World Heritage Site in Victoria, Australia
- Cuddie Springs – Archaeological site in Australia
- Fromm's landing
- Juukan Gorge – Gorge in Western Australia, known for ancient human habitation
- Kakadu National Park – Protected area in the Northern Territory of Australia
- Karnatukul – Rock art and archaeological site
- Port Arthur, Tasmania – UNESCO World Heritage Site in Australia
- Riverland midden
- Willandra Lakes Region – Lake in the state of New South Wales, Australia
- Murujuga – Burrup Peninsula in Western Australia
- Uluru-Kata Tjuta National Park – Protected area in the Northern Territory, Australia

== Publications ==
=== General books ===
- Flood, Josephine, 2010. Archaeology of the dreamtime: the story of prehistoric Australia and its people. Revised edition. Marleston: Gecko Books.
- Frankel, David, 1991. Remains to be seen: archaeological insights into Australian prehistory. Melbourne: Longman Cheshire.
- Frankel, David, 2017. Between the Murray and the sea: Aboriginal archaeology in south-eastern Australia. Sydney: Sydney University Press.
- Griffiths, Billy (2018). Deep Time Dreaming: Uncovering Ancient Australia. Black Inc. ISBN 978-1-76064-044-6.
- Hiscock, Peter, 2008. Archaeology of ancient Australia. Abingdon: Routledge.
- Holdaway, Simon and Nicola Stern, 2004. A record in stone: the study of Australia's flaked stone artefacts. Melbourne: Museum Victoria and Aboriginal Studies Press.
- Mulvaney, John and Johan Kamminga, 1999. Prehistory of Australia. Sydney: Allen & Unwin.
- Mulvaney, John and J. Peter White, (eds), 1987. Australians to 1788. Sydney: Fairfax, Syme & Weldon.
- Lourandos, Harry, 1997. A continent of hunter-gatherers. Cambridge: Cambridge University Press.

=== Journals ===
The principal academic journals publishing on Australian archaeology in Australia, are:

- Australian Archaeology
- Archaeology in Oceania
- Queensland Archaeological Research
- The Artefact
- Bulletin of the Australasian Institute for Maritime Archaeology
- Australasian Historical Archaeology

Some history-focused journals such as History Australia and Aboriginal History also feature Australian archaeology related topics. Several international journals such as Nature, Journal of Archaeological Science, Science, Antiquity and the International Journal of Historical Archaeology, often publish articles on Australian archaeology.

== See also ==
- Australian Aboriginal sacred site
- History of Indigenous Australians
