= List of learned societies in Australia =

This is a list of learned societies in Australia.

- The Australian Sociological Association
- Academy of the Social Sciences in Australia
- Anthropological Society of South Australia
- Anthropological Society of Victoria
- Archaeological and Anthropological Society of Victoria
- Archaeological Society of Victoria
- Asian Studies Association of Australia
- Association for the Study of Australian Literature
- Association of Australasian Palaeontologists
- Astronomical Society of Australia
- Australasian Arachnological Society
- Australasian College of Pharmacy
- Australasian College of Sport and Exercise Physicians
- Australasian Society for Experimental Psychology
- Australasian Society for Historical Archaeology
- Australian Academy of Forensic Sciences
- Australian Academy of Law
- Australian Academy of Science
- Australian Academy of Technology and Engineering
- Australian Academy of the Humanities
- Australian and New Zealand Law and History Society
- Australian and New Zealand Society of Biomechanics
- Australian Archaeological Association
- Australian Association of Consulting Archaeologists
- Australian Computer Society
- Australian Mathematical Society
- Australian Meteorological and Oceanographic Society
- Australian Society for Asian Humanities
- Australian Society for Biochemistry and Molecular Biology
- Austronesian Formal Linguistics Association
- Economic Society of Australia
- Engineers Australia
- Geological Society of Australia
- Linnean Society of New South Wales
- Mapping Sciences Institute
- National Academies Forum
- National Academies Forum
- Royal Agricultural Society of Tasmania
- Royal Anthropological Society of Australasia
- Royal Australasian College of Physicians
- Royal Australasian Ornithologists Union
- Royal Australian Chemical Institute
- Royal Australian Historical Society
- Royal Historical Society of Queensland
- Royal Historical Society of Victoria
- Royal Society of New South Wales
- Royal Society of Queensland
- Royal Society of South Australia
- Royal Society of Tasmania
- Royal Society of Victoria
- Royal Society of Western Australia
- Royal Western Australian Historical Society
- Royal Zoological Society of New South Wales
