= Historical archaeology in Australia =

Historical archaeology in Australia is the study of Australia's past through material remains such as artifacts (objects), structures (standing and ruined buildings, fences and roads), features (ditches, mounds, canals and landfills), and landscapes modified by human activity in their spatial and stratigraphic contexts.

There has been debate among archaeologists whether the definition of historical archaeology should be time-based (such as "the archaeology of the modern world", where "modern" is defined as 1500 CE onward), subject-based (for example, "the archaeology of capitalism") or method-based (such as "text-aided archaeology"). In Australia much of this discussion has been avoided, and definitions of historical archaeology (such as those adopted by the Australasian Society for Historical Archaeology and government regulatory agencies) have focused on a definition emphasising the combined use of documentary and material evidence.

In contrast with archaeological practice in the United Kingdom and the United States, historical archaeology in Australia has been intimately linked with industrial archaeology (sharing common practitioners, research goals and training). Eleanor Casella has noted this association, and the generally positive effect it has had on both fields of study. Historical archaeologists in Australia are better able to understand industrial processes, and industrial archaeologists better able to understand social processes because of this linkage.

The techniques of historical archaeology have also been applied to "contact sites" (Aboriginal historical archaeology). This area of study has looked at the encounters between Aboriginal people and settlers, and has been seen as an overlap of research interests between groups of archaeologists, historians and the Aboriginal community.

Maritime archaeology in Australia may be considered as a discipline within historical archaeology; there is a considerable overlap in interests and techniques, which has been recognised by close relationships between two professional bodies: the Australasian Society for Historical Archaeology and the Australasian Institute for Maritime Archaeology.

== History ==
The origins of historical archaeology in Australia are generally believed to lie in archaeological investigations by the late William (Bill) Culican at Fossil Beach in Victoria, research at Port Essington, Northern Territory by Jim Allen at the Australian National University in 1966-1968 and Judy Birmingham (from the University of Sydney) working at Irrawang Pottery in the Hunter Valley of New South Wales from 1967 to 1975.

In 1973, Birmingham and historian Ian Jack proposed a course in historical archaeology at the University of Sydney. As detailed by Jack, the proposal was fought by conservative members of the archaeology department; however, it was accepted and the first course in historical archaeology in Australia was taught in 1974 by Birmingham and Jack with contributions from geographer Dennis Jeans and historian Ken Cable. The course had a significant fieldwork component, to give students practical training. As noted by Jack, a number students from the first years of the course went on to contribute in their own right as archaeological consultants or in government.
