= Gary Presland =

Australian archaeologist and writer

Gary Presland is an Australian archaeologist and writer who studied history at La Trobe University 1973-76, and archaeology at the University of London, 1977-79. He was a staff member of the Victoria Archaeological Survey from 1983 to April 1988; his research interests are in the Aboriginal and natural history of Melbourne. One important contribution was the transcription and editing of the unpublished journals of George Augustus Robinson, Chief Protector of Aborigines in the Port Phillip District, 1839-1849. He was awarded the degree of Doctor of Philosophy at the University of Melbourne in 2005, for his reconstruction of the pre-European natural history of Melbourne.

Presland was the Thomas Ramsay Science and Humanities Fellow at Museum Victoria in 2001. Presland has been involved in the Archaeological and Anthropological Society of Victoria since 1972, and served as President 1984/85 and as editor of the Society's journal The Artefact. Presland is a Fellow of the Royal Historical Society of Victoria, and has been an editor of The Victorian Naturalist, the journal of the Field Naturalists Club of Victoria, since 2003. His recent research has focused on the early history of Melbourne. He was the president of the Box Hill Historical Society, from 2019 until 2025.

== Works ==
- The first residents of Melbourne's western region, Melbourne's Living Museum of the West/City of Footscray, 1987 (2nd Edition Harriland Press, 1997)
- (with Helen Harris) Cops and Robbers: a guide to researching police and criminal records in 19th century Victoria, Harriland Press, 1991
- For God’s sake, send the Trackers : a history of Queensland trackers and Victoria Police, Victoria Press, 1998. ISBN 978-0-644-46008-8.
- Scratching the Surface: A brief history of the Victoria Archaeological Survey 1972-1995. The Author, 2000
- Aboriginal Melbourne - The Lost Land of the Kulin, Harriland Press, 2001
- The Place for a Village: how nature has shaped the city of Melbourne, Museum Victoria Publishing, 2009 (winner of the 2009 Victorian Community History Awards for Best Book)
- First People: the Eastern Kulin of Melbourne, Port Phillip and Central Victoria Museum Victoria Publishing, 2010
- Understanding our natural environment: the Field Naturalists Club of Victoria 1880-2015 Field Naturalists Club of Victoria, 2016 (commended in the Book category 2016 Victorian Community History Awards)
