= Bibliography of Guangzhou =

The following is a list of works about the city of Guangzhou, China.

== List of works, arranged chronologically ==
=== Published in the 17th-18th century ===
- Alvaro Semedo (1655), "(Cantone)", The History of that Great and Renowned Monarchy of China, London: Printed by E. Tyler for I. Crook, OCLC 2158959
- J.-B Du Halde (1741), "The First City, and Capital of the Province of Quang Tcheou Fou", General History of China (3rd ed.), London: J. Watts
- Jacques Savary des Brûlons (1748). "(Canton)". Dictionnaire universel de commerce (in French) (New ed.). Paris: Estienne et fils. hdl:2027/ucm.5317968141.

=== Published in the 19th century ===
- Abraham Rees (1819), "Canton, or Quang-Choo-Foo", The Cyclopaedia, London: Longman, Hurst, Rees, Orme & Brown
- Jedidiah Morse; Richard C. Morse (1823), "Canton", A New Universal Gazetteer (4th ed.), New Haven: S. Converse
- David Brewster, ed. (1830). "Canton, or Quang-Tche-Foo". Edinburgh Encyclopædia. Edinburgh: William Blackwood.
- Samuel Shaw; Josiah Quincy (1847). The journals of Major Samuel Shaw : the first American consul at Canton. Boston: Wm. Crosby and H.P. Nichols.
- S. Wells Williams (1863), "Port of Canton", Chinese Commercial Guide (5th ed.), Hongkong: A. Shortrede & Co
- George Henry Townsend (1867), "Canton", A Manual of Dates (2nd ed.), London: Frederick Warne & Co.
- William Henry Overall, ed. (1870), "Canton", Dictionary of Chronology, London: William Tegg, OCLC 2613202
- J. Thomson (1873). Illustrations of China and Its People: a Series of 200 Photographs (2nd ed.). London: Sampson Low, Marston, Low, and Searle. (Includes several photos of Canton)
- Walter William Mundy (1875), "Canton", Canton and the Bogue, London: Samuel Tinsley
- Mrs. John Henry Gray (1880), Fourteen months in Canton, London: Macmillan and Co., OCLC 4995973, OL 6946768M.
- Charles J. Bullock (1884), "Canton", China Sea Directory (2nd ed.), London: Admiralty Hydrographic Office
- "Canton". The Chronicle & Directory for China, Corea, Japan, the Philippines, Indo-China, Straits Settlements, Siam, Borneo, Malay States, &c. Hong Kong: Daily Press. 1892.
- Boston Public Library (1895). "China: Canton". List of Works on Corea, Japan, and China. USA.
- John Thomson (1899), "Canton", Through China with a Camera (2nd ed.), London: Harper & Brothers, OCLC 1495715

=== Published in the 20th century ===
- Eliza Ruhamah Scidmore (1900), "City of Canton", China: the Long-lived Empire, New York: The Century Co.
- "Canton", Chambers's Encyclopaedia, London: W. & R. Chambers, 1901, "Yang-Ching"
- James Ricalton (1902), "Canton", Hongkong and Canton ... stereoscopic tour through China, New York: Underwood & Underwood
- "Canton", Lippincott's Gazetteer of the World, Philadelphia: J.B. Lippincott, 1902
- "Journal Sketches in China: Canton". American Architect and Building News. June 7, 1902.
- C. Bone (1903). "Canton". East of Asia Magazine. Shanghai: North-China Herald.
- Trade of Canton for the Year 1903, London: Foreign Office, 1904, OL 7032895M
- Claudius Madrolle (c. 1904). "Canton". Chine du Sud (in French). Comité de l'asie française.
- Arnold Wright, ed. (1908), "Canton", Twentieth Century Impressions of Hongkong, Shanghai, and Other Treaty Ports of China, London: Lloyd's Greater Britain Pub. Co.
- T. Hodgson Liddell (1909), "Canton", China, London: G. Allen
- "Kwangtung: Canton", The Provinces of China ... Reprinted from 'The National Review', Shanghai: National Review, 1910, OCLC 8017846
- Leon E. Seltzer, ed. (1952), "Canton", Columbia Lippincott Gazetteer of the World, New York: Columbia University Press, p. 326, OL 6112221M, "Kwangchow or Kuang-chou"
- Shahid Yusuf; Weiping Wu (1997). "Guangzhou". Dynamics of Urban Growth in Three Chinese Cities. World Bank / Oxford University Press. ISBN 9780195211139.
- Damian Harper; Robert Storey (1999), Hong Kong, Macau & Guangzhou (9th ed.), Australia: Lonely Planet, OL 16032929W
- John Paxton (1999). "Guangzhou (Canton), China". Penguin Encyclopedia of Places. Penguin. ISBN 9780140512755 – via Credo Reference.

=== Published in the 21st century ===
- Victoria and Albert Museum (2003), Souvenir from Canton : Chinese export paintings from the Victoria and Albert Museum, Shanghai: Shanghai gu ji chu ban she, ISBN 7532535487, 7532535487
- Piper Gaubatz, “Globalization and the Development of New Central Business Districts in Beijing, Shanghai and Guangzhou,” chapter 6 in Restructuring the Chinese City: Changing Society, Economy and Space (New York: Routledge, 2005) 98-121.
- Yong Chen (2006), John McCusker (ed.), "Guangzhou", History of World Trade Since 1450, Detroit: Macmillan Reference USA – via Global Issues In Context
- Hilary du Cros and Yok-shiu F. Lee, ed. (2007), Cultural Heritage Management in China: Preserving the Cities of the Pearl River Delta, UK: Routledge, ISBN 9780415397193, 0415397197
- Dong Wang (2007), "Guangzhou", in Thomas Benjamin (ed.), Encyclopedia of Western Colonialism since 1450, Detroit: Macmillan Reference USA – via Global Issues In Context
- Evan Osnos (February 9, 2009). "Letter from China: The Promised Land". The New Yorker. pp. 50 ff. (Article about Africans in Guangzhou)
- Gregory Bracken, ed. (2012). Aspects of Urbanization in China: Shanghai, Hong Kong, Guangzhou. Amsterdam University Press. ISBN 9789089643988.
- Chen Yu (2012), Modernizing Chinese Cities: Guangzhou From Treaty Port To Metropolis – via International Planning History Society
- Gordon Mathews, Linessa Dan Lin and Yang Yang (2017). The World in Guangzhou: Africans and other foreigners in South China's marketplace. University of Chicago Press. ISBN 9780226506074.

== See also ==
- Guangzhou history
- Timeline of Guangzhou
- Chinese historiography
