= R. Ian Jack =

Australian historian and geographer

Robert Ian Jack
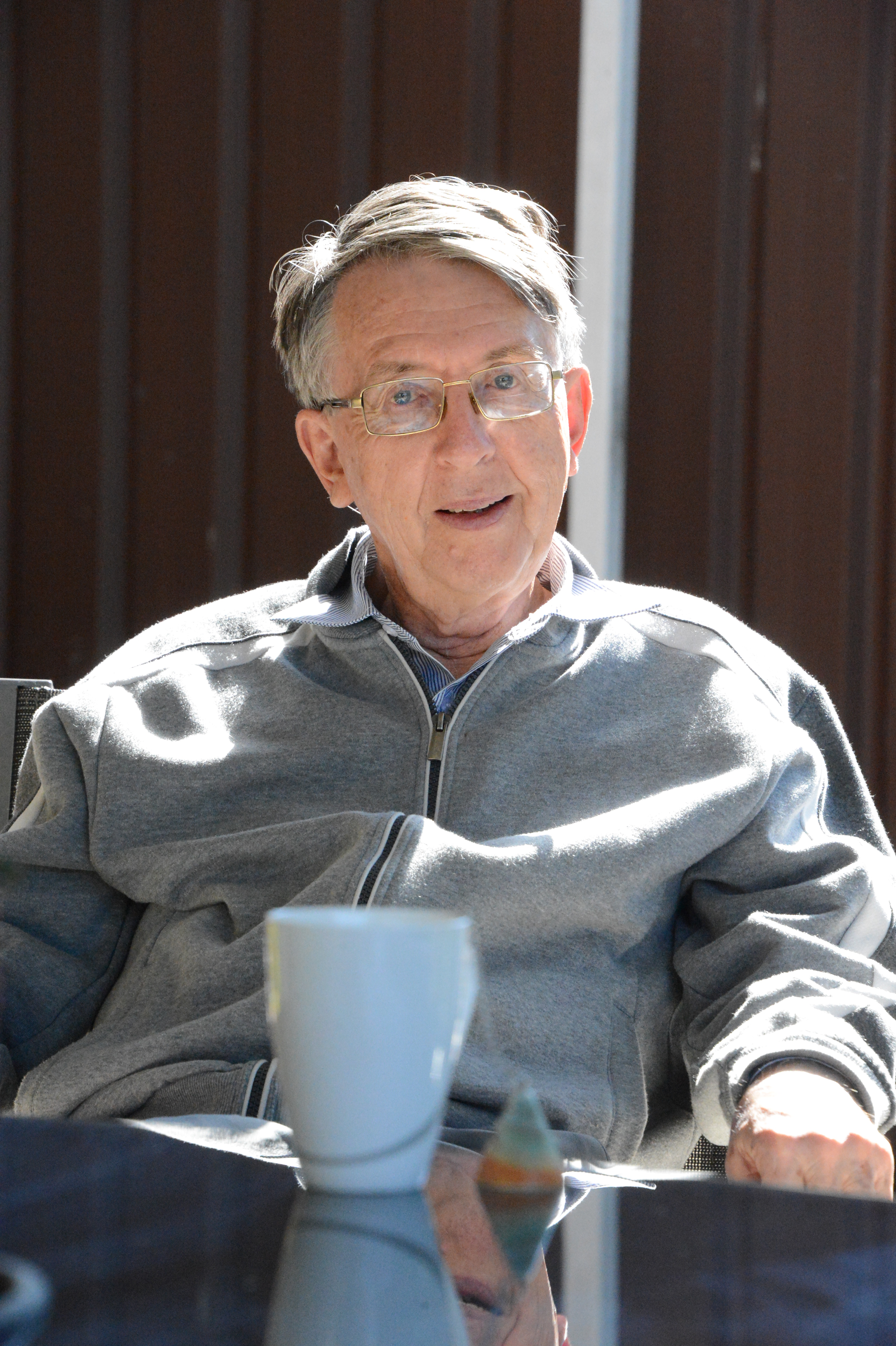
- Jack in 2015
- Born: 1935; Dumfriesshire, Scotland
- Died: 2019-09-04; Windsor, New South Wales, Australia
- Occupation: Associate Professor

Academic background
- Education: University of Glasgow, University of London, University of Sydney

Academic work
- Discipline: Historian, historical researcher supreme, heritage specialist, industrial archaeologist

Robert Ian Jack (1935 – 2019) FRHistS, FRAHS, was an Australian historian, archivist, heritage specialist, industrial archaeologist, and musician.

== Early life ==
Ian Jack was born in Dumfriesshire, Scotland to Robert Jack (a banker) and Janet Swan. His family farmed Pierbank there.

He went to primary school in Dumfries before winning an academic scholarship to Ayrshire Academy where he finished as dux and also learned to play the organ.

He majored in history at Glasgow University gaining honours and helping support himself by serving as church organist in various churches.

He went to London where he gained a qualification in archiving and a PhD from London University. His dissertation was on The Lords Grey of Ruthin, 1325 to 1490: a study in the lesser baronage.

He migrated to Sydney in 1961 to re-establish a medieval European history curriculum at the University of Sydney.

== Personal life ==
He was married four times; his spouses were Sybil Milliner Thorpe, Stella Charman, Aedeen Cremin, and Jan Barkley. He had three children by his first wife.

== Academic career ==
Jack became a lecturer in the History department at the University of Sydney in 1961 travelling by sea from England via the Suez canal to Sydney. He became a senior lecturer in 1965, and associate professor in 1970. He served as Dean of the Faculty of Arts for two consecutive terms from 1974 to 1977, and was Head of the Department of History between 1979 and 1982, and 1992 to 1995. He was chair of the Board of Music for 14 years. He retired in 2002 and was made an honorary research associate. He was conferred an honorary fellow of the University of Sydney on 13 May 2016

In 1974, Jack co-founded the cross department discipline of Historical Archaeology at the University of Sydney with Judy Birmingham and introduced the first undergraduate subject in that area. Although their course proposal was opposed by conservative members of the archaeology department, it was ultimately accepted and became the first course in historical archaeology in Australia. Subjects were taught by Birmingham and Jack, as well as geographer Dennis Jeans and historian Ken Cable. The course also had a significant fieldwork component to give student essential practical training.

Jack had a long association with St Andrew's College at the University of Sydney, being appointed Wilson Fellow in 1979, holding positions including Senior Tutor, Hunter Baillie Fellow in Oriental and Polynesian Languages, Senior Fellow, Woodhouse Fellowship, President of the Senior Common Room, College Archivist and Librarian. He also organised numerous musical events and regularly played the college organ.

Jack was the longest-serving President of the Royal Australian Historical Society, from 2003 to 2011 and was elected a Fellow in 2004. He was a member of the NSW Heritage Council and joined the committee of the Blue Mountains Association of Cultural Heritage Organisations in 2006, as an inaugural member, later becoming vice-president, and president. He was also president of Hawkesbury Historical Society, and vice-president of The Friends of the Paragon. Jack has published extensively in the areas of heritage, local history and historical archaeology from Medieval Wales to the Hawkesbury and Nepean Valley. He was a passionate historian, historical researcher, heritage specialist, industrial archaeologist and an accomplished musician. The Australasian Society for Historical Archaeology presents the R. Ian Jack Award for the Best Honours Thesis annually.

He was a longtime member of the Book Collectors Society of Australia and he wrote articles for their journal Biblionews and Australian Notes & Queries. As a book collector he, “had a vast medieval collection, with a particular interest in Joan of Arc; he also collected Australian non-fiction.”

== Death ==
Jack died from heart problems (hypertrophic cardiomyopathy). He had been suffering from prostate cancer and related kidney problems.

== Publications ==
- R. Ian Jack (1995). "Joadja, New South Wales; The Paragon of Early Oil-Shale Communities" (PDF). Australasian Historical Archaeology. 13: 31–40.
- Ian Jack (2008). "Mount Wilson". Dictionary of Sydney.
- Ian Jack, Department of History, University of Sydney (1996). SOHI for Site of Lithgow Valley Colliery Pottery and Brickworks.
- Jack, R. Ian (Robert Ian), 1935-, Kingston, Daphne and University of Sydney. Department of Adult Education, A Colonial scene : the Hawkesbury-Nepean Valley. Dept. of Adult Education, University of Sydney, Sydney, 1980.
- Jack, R.I. and C.A. Liston, 1982–83 'A Scottish Immigrant in New South Wales: James King of Irrawang', Journal of Royal Australian Historical Society 68:92–106.
- Jack, R Ian. “Joadja, New South Wales; The Paragon of Early Oil-Shale Communities.” Australasian Historical Archaeology, vol. 13, 1995, pp. 31–40.
- R Ian Jack & Aedeen Cremin, Australia's Age of Iron History and Archaeology Oxford University Press, Sydney University Press, South Melbourne 1994
- Jack, R.I., Holmes, K. & Kerr, R. (1984) Ah Toy's Garden: a Chinese Market-Garden on the Palmer River Goldfield, North Queensland. Australian Historical Archaeology, 2: 51- 58.
- Jack, R. Ian. (1972) Medieval Wales, ISBN 0340126949
