= Caroline Bird (disambiguation) =

Caroline Bird (born 1986) is a British writer.

Caroline Bird may also refer to:

- Caroline Bird (American author) (1915–2011), American feminist author
- Caroline Bird (archaeologist), Australian archaeologist and educator
