= Daima =

Archaeological site in Nigeria

- Daima
- 12.2014°N 14.5000°E
- Location: Nigeria

Site notes
- Height: 10.65 metres (34.9 ft)

Daima is a mound settlement located in Nigeria, near Lake Chad, and about 5 kilometres (3.1 mi) away from the Nigerian frontier with Cameroon. It was first excavated in 1965 by British archaeologist Graham Connah. Radiocarbon dating showed the occupations at Daima cover a period beginning early in the first millennium BC, and ending early in the second millennium AD. The Daima sequence then covers some 1800 years. Daima is a perfect example of an archaeological tell site, as Daima's stratigraphy seems to be divided into three periods or phases which mark separate occupations. These phases are called Daima I, Daima II, and Daima III. Although these occupations differ from each other in multiple ways, they also have some shared aspects with one another. Daima I represents an occupation of a people without metalwork; Daima II is characterized by the first iron-using people of the site; and Daima III represents a rich society with a much more complex material culture.

== Location ==
Daima is located in northeastern Nigeria, 5 kilometres (3.1 mi) away from the Cameroonian frontier. It is also close to Lake Chad, as it is located about 45 kilometres (28 mi) away from the shoreline. The excavations discovered that around Daima, large deposits of firki clay are found. Further excavations proved that Daima's base also rests on firki clay plains. The mound's surroundings are composed of sandy areas. An aerial survey of the site suggested the sand area is larger than the firki area. The survey also suggested the sand may be of alluvial origin. The excavation also demonstrated that the firki clay in which Daima sits on, is very thin and there is some sand beneath it. This suggests the first settlement of the mound might have grown on a small sand island that extended to the edge of the firki as time passed. Little vegetation is found in the area, as this area is part of the wet season fields used by the present Daima village; also, because large numbers of cattle are watered down in the pool located at the northeast edge of the mound during dry seasons. Aside from grass, the other type of vegetation that survives and can be found in the area consists of bushes of Calotropis procera, which is particularly available at the site. Thorny forests are also available at the site. Few trees are also scattered throughout. Other trees such as Balanites aegyptiaca, Ficus gnaphalocarpa, and Acacia albida were documented as being present in the mound around 1967. Occasional patches of thorn bushes such as Ziziphus spina-christi, and Ziziphus mauritania are also found.

== Archaeology ==
Daima was first excavated by Graham Connah in 1965 and 1966. According to Connah, who was the lead archaeologist in this project, seven test shafts of 2.13 by 2.12 metres (7.0 by 7.0 ft) each were sunk at 30-metre (98 ft) intervals on the highest point of the mound to its edge. These cuttings showed most of the ground properties such as levels of sand, firki clay, animal disturbances, white and black ash, and levels of burials. Archaeologists working in this project tried to find a way to remove the loosened deposits from the cutting and dump them at a sufficient distance from the cutting edge. Many of the cuttings were dug with trowels, picks and shovels. The excavated soil was carried away and deposited on soil heaps at a safe distance for further observation and analysis. All the test cuttings (Cuttings I-VIII) were excavated in the same manner. The cuttings were later backfilled to keep the site protected from erosion.

Intense radiocarbon analyses discovered that Daima dates to early in the first millennium BC until early into the second millennium AD. The excavations showed the stratigraphy of the mound seems to separate Daima into three parts. Daima I represents a community of people without any metalwork who herded cattle and grew sorghum. Daima II is characterized by the first iron working people of the mound's history. Daima III represents a community of people with a rich material culture which include many different kinds of exotic goods and materials.

== Daima I: 550 BC to 50 AD ==
Daima I is characterized by a sloping complex of hearths which consist of a mixture of red and yellow burnt sand and firki clay, and white ash. Houses at Daima I were built out of thin wood and then were covered with grass or mats. Lumps of fired clay at Daima I are surprisingly low in contrast to the other two phases of the mound. Traces of black and white ash are present, as well as animal bones, potsherds, and charcoal. Bone tools and animal clay figurines are also found at Daima I. It is believed the people of Daima I grew sorghum, as well as hunted and fished.

=== Pottery ===
At Daima I, vast amounts of broken pottery or potsherds can be found. Some of the decoration patterns include comb-sampling, comb-drawing, grooving and ridging, wiping and smoothing, plaited cord roulettes, and mat impressions. The shape and form of the pottery include small bowls and pots, as well as pots with curved necks, externally thickened rims and pot-lids. Although round-based pots were widely available throughout Daima's history.

=== Fired clay figurines ===
Since Daima sits on firki clay, the inhabitants of Daima used it a lot throughout the three phases. The fired clay figurines found at Daima I depicted cows and cattle in general. Most of the clay figurines were about 5 centimetres (2.0 in) in length. Two main styles of clay figurines are found at the site. These styles are standing and sitting depictions of cattle. The exact purpose of the clay figurines is unknown, but it is generally hypothesized that societies build figurines of the animals their economy relies on as adoration or idolization. Clay bracelets and miniature pots which are believed to be children toys, were also made at Daima I.

=== Stone tools ===
Just like potsherds, great amounts of stone tools are found at the site. The most prominent kind of stone tools found are ground stone axes. The overall findings of stone tools in this area is remarkable, as this part of Nigeria is fairly stone-less. Some of the found stone tools also include stone grinders, grindstones, and pounders. Some of these tools might have been used as bead polishers. In addition, a round "stone ball" is also found at this deposit. Because of a continuous wear seen in the stone tools, it is believed these were being reused as they broke down. It is thought that pieces of broken grindstones became grinders or pounders, which may have been reused once more as grooved stone.

Further analysis of the stone tools suggests the material is rhyolite from Hadjer el Hamis, a rock formation located about 80 kilometres (50 mi) away from Daima. Although it is believed stone materials were transported by water along Lake Chad. If this was the case, then the distance would be of about 210 kilometres (130 mi). Other materials used were granite, which is believed to have come from Grea, which is located around 121 kilometres (75 mi) away from Daima, and volcanic material from the Mandara Mountains. These vast distances hint trade with other places, but it remains uncertain.

=== Bone tools ===
Stone was not always easy to come by. Stone had to be collected, gathered, and then carried back to the site. Is believed this extensive process, caused people to turn to animal bones for tool material. Daima I is also characterized by beautiful and intricately made bone tools. Among these tools, the most notorious are the bone harpoons. The bone harpoons are boat-shaped in cross-section and are pointed at both ends. The length of these tools varies from 5.1 to 13 centimetres (2.0 to 5.1 in) and these usually have two line-retention lugs; Some have only one, and some do not have one at all. Also, the harpoons have a few barbs on them. Those mentioned details denote these tools are in fact harpoons that were intended to detach from their shaft and remain in the wound after impact.

Double-ended bone points are also highly common during this phase. In Daima's case, it is assumed the bone points were being used as projectiles such as arrows. A spatulate-like tool is also found at Daima I. This tool is made out of a splinter of metapodial bones with part of the proximal end used as the handle. The distal end of the bone was removed, and the end of the shaft was grounded to a chisel-like with a point on the edge. This artifact is thought to have been used as a skinning tool. In addition, an ulna tool is also present in the archaeological record of Daima I. This tool consists of a proximal end used as a handle, just as the spatulate tool previously mentioned. Also, the shaft was ground to a circular and pointed cross-section. Additional bone tools include a few spearheads.

=== Burials ===
Throughout Daima's history, the occupants buried the dead within the settlement. Most of the burials of Daima I were in a contracted position and some others were flexed burials. The contracted burials consisted of flexed legs, which in some occasions could almost touch the chest. The flexed burials consisted of merely flexed legs. The burials appear to be in a sleeping position. People were buried lying mostly on their right side. The arms and legs were flexed and the hands were placed before the face or under the head. The head was most of the times facing west or southwest and northwest. None of the burials at Daima I were adorned, and they had no personal goods on them.

== Daima II: 50 AD to 700 AD ==
The Daima II phase resembles that of Daima I. Sand and firki clay continue to be present in Daima II. Although the amount of firki clay at Daima II is not as extensive as it was on the previous phase. Remains of hearths in the form of red and yellow burnt sand and firki clay are highly available during this phase. There are also vast numbers of pits found. These measure about 50 to 70 centimetres (20 to 28 in) in diameter, and about 50 centimetres (1.6 ft) deep. It is believed that the people at Daima II were using these pits as trash dumpsters and sorghum storage units. Fishing and hunting continued to be practiced. Although there is a decrease in animal bones. This decrease would suggest an increase of the consumption of cereals such as sorghum.

=== Structures ===
By this time, house construction shifts from wood and grass, to clay and mud. One straight mud wall and the remains of a few circular mud houses were found. In addition, floor-like spreads were also found. These findings indicate circular mud houses were being built by the people of Daima II. An amazing piece of edge-laid potsherd pavement carefully laid in a zig-zag pattern was found, and it is believed to have been the floor of a circular mud hut. This particular feature dates to around 650 AD.

=== Pottery ===
Pottery features from Daima II, do not differ so greatly from the pottery of Daima I. Decoration patterns and methods such as com-sampling, grooving and riding, comb-drawing, wiping and smoothing, plaited cord roulettes, and mat impressions are present in Daima II. The shape of pots also continued to be the same. There are some small bowls and pots, as well as externally thickened rims and pot-lids continue to be made. Some new decoration patterns emerged. A decoration pattern called twisted cord roulette decoration appears for the first time at Daima II, and it continued to be a popular decoration pattern until the last occupation of the mound. Punctate impression decoration is also characteristic of this period, just as using cordons as decoration. Pot form and shape also changed. Globular and sub-hemispherical vessels emerged. Vertical and large rims also became popular in the pottery assemblage of Daima II.

=== Fired clay figurines ===
The making of clay figurines continued well into Daima II. But somewhere about halfway through the phase, clay figurines become less frequent. Clay figurines also become much more diverse in type during this phase of the mound. Clay figurines are now depicting humans and other anthropomorphic figures. Upright figures are also found, and are thought to represent animals or humans as well. Wild animals also start being depicted during Daima II. Clay beads and clay balls of about 2 centimetres (0.79 in) in diameter also appear for the first time at Daima II. Lip, nose, and ear ornaments also appear, as well as clay bracelets.

=== Stone and bone tools ===
Daima II is mostly characterized by the arrival of iron to the site. As iron became more and more popular, some tools decreased in making, or completely disappeared from the record. Stone balls are rarely found on the Daima II deposit, and the ground stone axe completely disappeared. Although grooved stones, grindstones and grinders are somewhat available throughout the record.

Bone tools also drastically decrease in popularity. The ulna tool cannot be found at all during Daima II. It seems harpoons, as well as the spatulate tools disappeared early in the Daima II phase. Double-ended bone points survived a bit longer, but after some time, they also stop being made. Animal bones are still found, but at a lesser degree, as well as few objects of worked animal phalanges.

=== Iron tools ===
There is a vast amount of iron found at Daima. Out of this iron, the earliest dates to about 500 A.D. Although it is still unclear exactly how iron arrived at Daima, iron tools became essential ever since iron first made it to the mound. Iron replaced both bone and stone tools to such degree, that they were almost extinguished. Among some of the available iron tools, there is what appears to be a knife or a spearhead. It is assumed that many other tools such as blades and hoes were present at the time. It is also presumed that the arrival of iron changed Daima entirely. Iron was essential not only on tool making, but also in cultural artifacts such as collars and bracelets. Iron is the reason why house construction during Daima II shifted to clay and mud huts and buildings, as it is easier to dig up the firki clay if using iron tools.

=== Burials ===
Just as the people of Daima I, the people of Daima two buried the dead in the settlement, and all of these burials are inhumations. Most of the burials at Daima II are positioned in a contracted way, although some others are flexed burials. Burials also lay on either side, but no preferred side is seen in most of them. Adult and few infant burials are found at Daima II. 7 adults and 5 immature individuals are present. just as the burials from Daima I, the burials of Daima II were not adorned nor had any material goods on them. Only one infant burial referred to as "Burial 38" was buried with what appear to be adornments. Burial 38 had an iron collar in its neck, as well as a large quartz bead which was also located near the neck. One of the forearms had one iron bracelet and many more iron fragments were found at the waist. Another infant burial referred to as "Burial 36" also had in one of its forearms an iron bracelet. In addition, it had a button-like bronze disc on its waist. Although it is possible that Burial 38 and Burial 36 were both intrusive from Daima III into Daima II.

== Daima III: 700 AD to 1150 AD ==
Although the archaeological matrix was still sand and firki clay, Daima III differed from the first two phases. The sand and ash deposits of Daima III appear to be even greater. A percentage of the mound is composed of ash. White and black ash can be found throughout the deposit. Pink ash is also found slightly covering some parts near the top of the mound. Pits are vastly available in Daima III. These pits vary in size; some are small and their purpose remains unknown. Others are believed to be used for storing food. Pots which were used as water storage units are also available. Very low amounts of animal bone are found throughout the entire Daima III phase.

=== Structures ===
Potsherd pavements stop being made in Daima III, as they cannot be found at all in any of the deposits from this phase. By this time, hearths were even more popular than they were on Daima I and Daima II. Clay fireplaces are the most common form of structural evidence. These fireplaces were made from clay that was fired to a yellow color. These also varied in size, shape and design. The fireplaces had circular shapes, but most of them were elongated with an opening on one side. These fireplaces had floor patterns which also varied significantly. Some had well-fired floors while others had a poorly made or no floor at all. In order to support pots, the fireplaces had 3 or more protrusions from the walls onto the fire cavity. These were also decorated with patterns such as running chevron pattern and diamond lattice pattern. The fireplaces are thought to have been used as domestic cooking places. Some of the fireplaces are believed to be blacksmithing forges, although this is still being debated.

Circular mud houses are still being constructed on Daima III. This is implied by the lack of postholes in this phase. Also, remains of circular walls can be found. There are also many remains of clay that appear to have formed part of some kind of structures. Remains of clay walls or decorated moldings can also be appreciated in the Daima III deposit. It appears that some of the buildings were constructed using bundles of grass which were very tightly tied, and were then plastered with mud.

=== Pottery ===
Changes in the material culture of Daima III can also be appreciated in its pottery. Pottery attributes from Daima I such as comb-sampling, comb-drawing, plaited cord roulettes and mat impressions disappeared. A series of new pottery features and attributes emerged. Carved roulettes in the form of running chevrons, as well as nodular roulettes emerged for the first time in Daima III. Changes in the form and shape of the pottery also occurred. Small bowls and pots with curved necks disappeared. What became characteristic attributes of pottery during this period include massive rims and terminal pieces of "So pots," legs, and flat bases with and without a foot. Some old decoration methods such as grooving and grinding, and wiping and smoothing persisted, as well as most of the pottery attributes from Daima II such as twisted cord roulettes, punctate impressions, and vertical rims. Externally thickened rims and pot-lids also persisted. Flat-based pots were characteristic of this phase of the site, as well as a type of tripod-pot.

=== Fired clay figurines ===
Fired clay figurines continued being made through this phase. By Daima III, clay figurines do not represent cattle as much as they did in the first two phases of the mound. Previously, only humpless cattle were depicted, but now a humped cow of the zebu type seems to be depicted. This could be an indication of the drying of the environment, as zebus are important for their abilities to survive in dry conditions. Sheep and goats were depicted in a running pose. The clay figurines of Daima III show a much more varied subject than those made in Daima I and Daima II. Anthropomorphic figurines start to become more and more prominent. These figurines are composed of a heavy cylindrical base which more likely supported a head which was later attached to the base. These figurines also display great emphasis on the arms and legs. Figurines of wild animals are also predominant in Daima III. Some of the depicted animals include ox, birds, fish, pigs, antelopes, and a possible baboon. Fish were generally depicted with spikes on them. This is also true about other animals, which makes identifying them somewhat difficult.

Humans and animals were not the only subjects of clay depictions. One canoe clay figurine of about 7.3 centimetres (2.9 in) is also found. It is assumed this clay figurine was meant to depict a papyrus boat. Clay bells, pendants, balls, and beads were also being made. Clay spindle-whorls became popular towards the end of the phase. Their making implies cotton became important in the mound during this period. Socket-stem smoking pipes appeared at the end of Daima III. Clay bracelets also became common towards the end of Daima III, as clay was cheaper than most metals, and widely available in the area. Clay rods which had a very careful and polished finish are also present. Although it is thought these were some kind of lip or nose adornment.

=== Stone and bone tools ===
Grooved stones made their way to Daima III and lasted until the last occupation. It is believed they were vital for the smoothing of arrow shafts and other artifacts alike. Grindstones and grinders or pounders also continue to be widely found in Daima III.

On the other side, the artifactual use of animal bone, which was so characteristic of Daima I, cannot be found at all by Daima III. Overall animal bones that showed human interaction occurred rarely throughout the Daima III phase.

=== Iron tools ===
Iron objects in Daima III are not as common as they were in Daima II. Most of the found iron is in the form of rods. Iron slag became common during this phase. This implies that iron was being smithed or at least smelted in Daima. Although if this was the case, greater amounts of iron slag would be expected to be found at the site.

=== Bronze ===
Bronze found its way to Daima, making its first appearance in Daima III. A bronze button-like object in the form of a waterfowl is found. This button-like object was made using the lost-wax technique, as were most of the bronze artifacts found at Daima III. The button's body is hollow and open on the underside, maybe to be able to be sewn into clothes. This artifact denotes the artistic and technological skill of the people at Daima. Bronze bracelets and rings are also found throughout this phase of the mound.

=== Organic remains ===
In Daima III, remains of organic material can be found in the form of carbonized grain. Great quantities of sorghum are available in the Daima III deposit. The earliest sorghum of this phase is found in some of the deeper deposits of Daima III, which would suggest sorghum was being cultivated at Daima from around 800 AD. Some evidence of Pennisetum type of millet is found in the form of clay casts of whole grains together. It appears millet was also being grown but at a lesser degree than sorghum. Remains of Ziziphus are also among the found organic remains. It is assumed this plant was used for its edible fruit.

=== Economy ===
The economy of Daima III was composed of farming and stock-rearing. As discussed above, sorghum and millet were being cultivated in the mound. Sorghum becoming much more popular by the latest deposits of Daima III. The remains of animal bones were analyzed, and it was discovered that small stock such as goats became more prominent near the last deposits. This is also suggested by the clay figurines as less depictions of cattle are found throughout. Fishing, hunting, fowling, and collecting were also part of the mound's economy. Some of the found animal bones belong to gazelles, reedbucks, warthogs, bushpigs, and elephants. There is also evidence of freshwater mollusk consumption such as Aspatharia and Pila wernei.

Long distance gathering and transporting of raw materials is still being practiced in Daima III. The most popular source of stone at this time is Hadjer el Hamis, just as it was back in Daima I. It makes sense, since it is closer to Daima, and transportation of materials through water was possible. By now, very little material is being gathered from the Mandara area. The decrease in the use of the Mandara area could hint sources of iron were being exploited a bit more.

=== Trade ===
Exotic materials are found throughout Daima during the Daima III phase. Materials such as bronze, glass, carnelian, and clear quartz are widely found in many of the burials of Daima III. The finding of these materials suggests that the people of Daima III had contacts with the outside world and were trading. It is believed that carnelian could have come from as far as India. Although it coming from somewhere along the Saharan margins is also possible. Bronze, clear quartz, and glass are also thought to have originated from outside the firki plains, but their exact place of origin continues to be unknown. For bronze is hypothesized that trans-Saharan merchants were bringing it to Daima. The way in which the people of Daima were paying for these goods and materials is unknown. It is assumed that the inhabitants of Daima were trading sorghum grains or animal products such as elephant tusks, leopard skin, and ostrich feathers. In addition, there is the possibility of selling warfare prisoners as slaves.

=== Burials ===
Just like the people of Daima I and Daima II, the people of Daima III buried the dead in the settlement. Daima III continued with many of the previous burial attitudes observed in both Daima I and Daima II. Once again, all of the burials are inhumations and the individuals were buried in flexed positions, although sometimes they were either contracted or extended. Most of the burials lay o their sides with an apparent preference for the right side. Most of the time, hands were placed in front or under the head, and the head is mostly oriented to the west or southwest and northwest, just as in Daima I. The only way in which the burials of Daima III differentiate from the other two phases, is an increase of grave goods. These were found on 14 of 19 burials. Many of the found grave goods are made from exotic materials such as quartz, bronze, glass and carnelian. These are significant, as they might be indicating personal wealth and status. Some of the most interesting grave goods include a bronze disc found placed near the neck of the individual from "Burial 31." This bronze disc is very thin and about 5.2 centimetres (2.0 in) in diameter. The disc rises to a point at the center and a twisted molding covers the entire edge. The back is hollow and has a retention bar. As mentioned above, this bronze disc was made using the lost-wax casting technique. "Burial 19" is interesting, as it is the only burial which has a clay headrest. This headrest is about 17.2 centimetres (6.8 in) long. Other found grave goods are iron penannular ornaments, iron bracelets, one necklace composed of 29 carnelian beads, blue glass cylinder, and quartz cylinder of different shapes and sizes. Carnelian pendants, brass and bronze biconical beads, clay beads, quartz biconical beads, disc beads, faceted cylinder beads, brown glass and ostrich eggshell beads are also part of the found grave goods.
