= Peter Coutts (archaeologist) =

Australian archaeologist

- Born: Peter John Frazer Coutts
- Education: University of Melbourne; University of Otago
- Scientific career
- Fields: Archaeology
- Thesis: The emergence of the Foveaux Strait Maori from prehistory : a study of culture contact (1972)

Peter John Frazer Coutts is an Australian archaeologist who was first director of the Victoria Archaeological Survey (VAS), the precursor to the Heritage Branch of Aboriginal Affairs Victoria.

== Early life and education ==
Peter Coutts was educated at the University of Melbourne in electrical engineering but was later a post-graduate student in the School of General Studies at the Australian National University. In 1964 to 1967 he undertook research on Aboriginal settlement at Wilsons Promontory in which he excavated several test pits in shell middens from which several radiocarbon dates were obtained. His work is interesting in its pioneering use of computers to analyse data from the sites. The results of the research were published in a Masters thesis and later by the Australian Institute of Aboriginal Studies.

After concluding his research at ANU, Coutts enrolled as a postgraduate student at the University of Otago, New Zealand, under the supervision of Charles Higham. As a pioneer in the field of historical archaeology he made a significant contribution to the development of historical archaeology in New Zealand. His PhD research focused on the period of contact between Māori and the European settlers, typically sealers and whalers. Coutts also pioneered the archaeology of standing structures, what would become to be called buildings archaeology. It is clear from his published works that his research interests in historical archaeology were very broad, with a particular interest in the archaeology of buildings.

== Career ==
In 1972 the Archaeological and Aboriginal Relics Office was established in Victoria under the provisions of the Archaeological and Aboriginal Relics Preservation Act (1972) and in April 1973 Peter Coutts was appointed as its director. Faced with little knowledge of the Aboriginal archaeology of Victoria, apart from previous work at Keilor and Green Gully and his own work at Wilsons Promontory, Coutts decided that improving the knowledge of Aboriginal heritage was a priority for the AARO and later the Victorian Archaeological Survey. To do this he decided to undertake a field survey of a section across Victoria from south to north based on the 1:100,000 map sheet series. Selected sites were to be excavated to provide a chronology of Aboriginal settlement.

Lacking the staff to undertake this work, Coutts initiated the Archaeological Summer School program. These were field camps where anyone could pay to learn the rudiments of archaeology and record or excavate archaeological sites. The first was a small affair in January 1975 and nine others were run between 1975 and 1982. These were an important training ground for avocational and student archaeologists from all over Australia.

In company with the Summer Schools was an accreditation scheme where participants studied archaeology, were examined and certified to undertake aspects of archaeological work unsupervised. At the time no university in Victoria offering courses in Aboriginal archaeology so this was an attempt to develop a community of researchers in the archaeology of Victoria. The development of the archaeology course at La Trobe University from 1976 effectively put paid to this scheme although the two ran in parallel for a few years.

Coutts had a passionate devotion to the publication of his work. Lacking the means to quickly bring the results of the work to the public, Coutts developed an in-house publications capacity within the AARO and VAS which produced the series Records of the Victorian Archaeological Survey, the VAS Occasional Reports series and other related publications. Although not particularly polished and often not peer reviewed, Coutts' reports at least brought critical information into the public realm, establishing the basis for archaeological research in Victoria for following decades.

Coutts undertook numerous archaeological survey and research projects, including extensive investigations of Aboriginal mound sites in the Western District, mounds along the Murray River, rock shelters at Gariwerd fish traps at Lake Condah and undertook historic archaeological work on European settlement sites as Sullivans Cove and Corinella and Captain Mills cottage.

Coutts has also contributed to the archaeology of the Philippines.

Ultimately, Coutts' vision of a research-driven archaeological survey of Victoria became increasingly separate from the changing visions of a public service organisation, particularly after the election of the Cain Labor government in Victoria in 1982. In particular, the Aboriginal community in Victoria were concerned about lack of consultation about their heritage, which VAS was managing. Peter Coutts felt that research was losing out to management and in 1984 he took a year's leave to complete projects, resigning in 1985. He has not been active in archaeology since then.

He has, however, published several papers and three books on Irish Quakers, including one (The Watsons of Kilconnor, County Carlow, 1650–Present) on the history of his mother's family.
