= Thomas Ramsay (disambiguation) =

Thomas Ramsay (1877–1956) was a Scottish politician.

Thomas Ramsay or Tom Ramsay may also refer to:

- Sir Thomas Ramsay (businessman) (born 1907), son of William Ramsay, founder of Kiwi shoe polish
- Thomas Ramsay (Scottish Baptist) (1867–1934), Scottish lay pastor and businessman
- Thomas Donald Ramsay (born 1939), representative for the Texas House of Representatives
- Tom Ramsay (curler) (1901–1995), Canadian curler
- Tom Ramsay (Neighbours), fictional character in the Australian TV series Neighbours

== See also ==
- Thomas Ramsay Science and Humanities Fellowship
- Thomas Ramsey (disambiguation)
