= Judy Birmingham =

British-Australian archaeologist

Jean (Judy) Birmingham AM is a prominent English historical archaeologist, who has been based in Sydney, Australia, for most of her career. She is well known for her roles in the development of historical archaeology and cultural heritage management in Australia. In 2017 she was awarded a Member of the Order of Australia for her work in this field.

== Biography ==
Birmingham received her MA in Classics from the University of St Andrews in 1953 and latter attended the UCL Institute of Archaeology and received her MA in Archaeology from there in 1959. In 1961, an opening for an Iron Age specialist was created at the University of Sydney, and Birmingham was recommended for the post. Birmingham and her then-husband Michael travelled to Australia, where she taught as a lecturer, specialising in Iron Age Cyprus and Anatolia. She was, at that time, a specialist in Mediterranean and West Asian archaeology.

In 1966, Birmingham began to look for sites close to Sydney where her students could get basic training in archaeological techniques, including excavation. In 1967, Birmingham began running excavations at the site of Irrawang Pottery, the pottery works owned by James King at Irrawang just north of Newcastle. This project is considered to be one of the first examples of historical archaeology in Australia. In organising these excavations one of her former students, David Frankel (archaeologist), remembers her as being "at odds with the very traditional approaches of other archaeologists" in believing that "theory had to be matched by practice".

Excavations led by Birmingham also took place at Wybalenna Island. Her excavations there provided an archaeological view of the place where George Augustus Robinson housed the displaced Aboriginal Tasmanians. The participants included several Aboriginal people which was not considered standard at this time.

In 1973, Birmingham and historian Ian Jack proposed teaching a course in historical archaeology at the University of Sydney. As detailed by Jack, the course proposal was fought by the conservative members of the archaeology department; however the proposal was accepted and the first course in historical archaeology in Australia was taught by Birmingham, Jack, geographer Dennis Jeans and historian Ken Cable. The course also had a significant fieldwork component to give student essential practical training.

== Contribution to professional organisations ==
Birmingham was instrumental in forming the Australasian Society for Historical Archaeology (ASHA), which was founded as the Australian Society for Historical Archaeology in 1970. ASHA began at the University of Sydney and developed because of Birmingham's enthusiasm for historical archaeology. She edited early issues of the ASHA Newsletter, organised special publications and conferences. She served as the society's first secretary (1970-1980), and later served as president (1980-1991).

Birmingham was a Founder Member of Australia ICOMOS and contributed to the drafting of the Burra Charter. Birmingham was also an active member of the National Trust of Australia, including acting as Chairman of its Industrial Archaeology Committee (1969-1985).

== Awards and honours ==
In recognition of her contributions to ASHA, Birmingham was made an Honorary Life Member of the association. ASHA has also created an annual award named in her honour, the "Judy Birmingham Award for Best Historical Archaeology Consulting Report".

In 2001, Birmingham was awarded by the Australian Government a Centenary Medal for "service to Australian society and the humanities in prehistory and archaeology" and in 2017 she was awarded a Member of the Order of Australia for "significant service to higher education, particularly to historical archaeology, as an academic, and to professional associations." In the same year she was honoured with a lifetime achievement award at the National Trust of Australia's Heritage Awards.

== Oral history ==
Birmingham's oral history, recorded in 2012, is available at the National Library of Australia:

- Birmingham, Judy & Hanna, Bronwyn J. (2012). Judy Birmingham interviewed by Bronwyn Hanna in the Burra Charter oral history project [sound recording]

== Partial bibliography ==
- Zagora (1972), (Birmingham et al.), Sydney Up, ISBN 0-424-06200-3
- Old Sydney Burial Ground 1974, (Birmingham et al.), Australian Society for Historical Archaeology, ISBN 0-909797-05-6
- Australian Pioneer Technology. Sites and Relics (1979), (Birmingham et al.), Heinemann Educational Australia, ISBN 0-85859-185-5
- 10,000 Years of Sydney Life (1980), (Peter Stanbury, with Judy Birmingham, editor), The Macleay Museum, the University of Sydney, ISBN 0-909635-17-X
- Industrial archaeology in Australia: Rural industry (1983), (Judy Birmingham), Heinemann Publishers Australia, ISBN 0-85859-319-X
- Castle Hill Archaeological Report (1984), (Birmingham et al.), ISBN 0-7240-8366-9
- Papers in Australian Historical Archaeology, (Birmingham et al.)
- Archaeology and Colonisation (1988), (Birmingham et al.), American Society of Civil Engineers, ISBN 0-909797-15-3
- Birmingham, Judy & Australian Society for Historical Archaeology. (1992). Wybalenna: the archaeology of cultural accommodation in nineteenth century Tasmania : a report of the Historical Archaeological Investigation of the Aboriginal establishment on Flinders Island / Judy Birmingham. [Sydney, N.S.W.] : Australian Society for Historical Archaeology
- Transformations. The Art of Recycling (2000), (Birmingham et al.) ISBN 0-902793-45-4

== See also ==
- Industrial archaeology
- A Life in Archaeology: In Conversation with Judy Birmingham.
