= Antonio Sagona =

Antonio (Tony) Giuseppe Sagona (1956 – 2017), was an archaeologist and classics professor who taught at the University of Melbourne in Victoria, Australia.

Tony Sagona was born in Tripoli, Libya, on April 30, 1956. Accompanying his parents, Salvatore and Maria he migrated to Australia in 1960, initially settling in Williamstown, Victoria.

Sagona received his education at the all-boys school St Paul's College, Altona, completing his secondary education in 1973 and in the Humanities Department at the University of Melbourne. His PhD topic was the archaeology of the early Bronze Age Kura–Araxes culture of the Caucasus Region, which he completed in 1984. This was published as The Caucasian Region in the Early Bronze Age in 1984. Sagona tutored in the Humanities Department during his PhD candidature, and on the sudden death of his mentor and model, Bill Culican, he took over Culican's course and was appointed as a lecturer in Archaeology. He was promoted to senior lecturer in 1989, became an associate professor and reader in 1995, and was appointed to a full Professorship in 2006. He was granted the title of Emeritus Professor shortly before his death in 2017.

He has written a number of books on the archaeology of the Near East, with his fieldwork concentrating on ancient settlements, landscapes and cemeteries in Anatolia, the Caucasus and Syria.

His fieldwork has covers late prehistory to modern historic periods, with a focus on ancient settlements, landscapes and cemeteries in Turkey (Anatolia), the Caucasus, and Syria. His Work in Turkey included the first systematic archaeological investigations of Erzurum and Bayburt Provinces, helping to establish cultural sequences for the area east of the Euphrates River. He also collaborated with the Georgian National Museum in the southern Caucasus at the site of Samtavro. From 2007 he also undertook investigations into the World War I battlefields at Gallipoli, as part of the Joint Historical and Archaeological Survey of the ANZAC Battlefield, for the Australian Department of Veterans' Affairs, and the New Zealand Ministry of Culture and Heritage in collaboration with Çanakkale Onsekiz Mart University. An edition of the publication Orientalia Lovaniensia Analecta was dedicated in his honour.

Sagona was an elected a Fellow of the Australian Academy of the Humanities in 2005 and Fellow of the Society of Antiquaries of London in 2004. He was editor of the Ancient Near Eastern Studies journal and co-editor of its monograph series. He was awarded a Member of the Order of Australia in 2013.

Sagona died on 29 June 2017 from a cancer related illness.

== Publications ==
- Ancient Turkey, (with Paul Zimansky), 2009, Routledge
- The Archaeology of the Caucasus : From Earliest Settlements to the Iron Age Cambridge University Press, 2017, ISBN 9781107016590
- Anzac Battlefield: A Gallipoli Landscape of War and Memory, Antonio Sagona, Mithat Atabay, Christopher Mackie, Ian McGibbon, Richard Reid Cambridge University Press, 5 Jan. 2016
