= Thomas Ramsey =

Thomas Ramsey may refer to:

- Toad Ramsey (1864–1906), American Major League Baseball player
- Tom Ramsey (born 1961), former American football quarterback
- Thomas Ramsey (MP) for Wallingford (UK Parliament constituency)
- Thomas Ramsey (mayor) (1510–1590), Lord Mayor of London
- Thomas F. Ramsey (1858–1911), member of the Wisconsin State Assembly
- Tom Ramsey (politician), member of the Georgia State Senate

== See also ==
- Thomas Ramsay (disambiguation)
