= Adrian Gill (meteorologist) =

Australian meteorologist

Adrian Edmund Gill
- Born: 22 February 1937
- Died: 19 April 1986 (aged 49)
- Awards: Chree medal and prize (1985)
- Scientific career
- Fields: Meteorology and oceanography
- Thesis: The Stability of Axisymmetric Fluid Flows (1963)
- Doctoral advisor: George Batchelor

Adrian Edmund Gill FRS (22 February 1937 – 19 April 1986) was an Australian meteorologist and oceanographer best known for his textbook Atmosphere-Ocean Dynamics. Gill was born in Melbourne, Australia, and worked at Cambridge, serving as Senior Research Fellow from 1963 to 1984. His father was Edmund Gill, geologist, palaeontologist and curator at the National Museum of Victoria.

Gill was chair of the Tropical Ocean Global Atmosphere program. He was elected a Fellow of the Royal Society of London in 1986. His candidacy citation read: "Dr A. E. Gill is internationally recognised for his work in geophysical fluid dynamics and leads a small but highly productive team working on problems in dynamical oceanography and meteorology. He has made outstanding theoretical contributions to a wide range of topics, including the stability of pipe flow, thermal convection, circulation of the Southern Ocean, seasonal variability of the ocean, waves in rotating fluids, wind-induced upwelling, coastal currents and sea-level changes and coastally-trapped waves in the atmosphere, and he is particularly effective in the way he is able to interpret observations and guide the activities of observational workers".

== Honours ==
- Individual Merit Senior Principal Scientific Officer of the Meteorological Office.
- Florida State University has a professorship endowned in his honor.
- The Royal Meteorological Society annually awards an "Adrian Gill Award" to a member of the Society who has made a significant contribution in [fields] that interface between atmospheric science and... oceanography, hydrology, geochemistry and numerical methodologies.

== Selected publications ==
- Batchelor, G. K.; Gill, A. E. (1962). "Analysis of the stability of axisymmetric jets". Journal of Fluid Mechanics. 14 (4): 529. Bibcode:1962JFM....14..529B. doi:10.1017/S0022112062001421. S2CID 123452950.
- Gill, A. E. (1966). "The boundary-layer regime for convection in a rectangular cavity". Journal of Fluid Mechanics. 26 (3): 515–536. Bibcode:1966JFM....26..515G. doi:10.1017/S0022112066001368. S2CID 121330359.
- Longuet-Higgins, M. S.; Gill, A. E. (1967). "Resonant interactions between planetary waves". Proceedings of the Royal Society of London. Series A. Mathematical and Physical Sciences. 299 (1456): 120–144. Bibcode:1967RSPSA.299..120L. doi:10.1098/rspa.1967.0126. S2CID 120179723.
- Baines, P. G.; Gill, A. E. (1969). "On thermohaline convection with linear gradients". Journal of Fluid Mechanics. 37 (2): 289–306. Bibcode:1969JFM....37..289B. doi:10.1017/S0022112069000553. S2CID 120776161.
- Gill, A. E.; Davey, A. (1969). "Instabilities of a buoyancy-driven system". Journal of Fluid Mechanics. 35 (4): 775–798. Bibcode:1969JFM....35..775G. doi:10.1017/S0022112069001431. S2CID 122414069.
- "A discussion on ocean currents and their dynamics - Ocean models". Philosophical Transactions of the Royal Society of London. Series A, Mathematical and Physical Sciences. 270 (1206): 391–413. 1971. doi:10.1098/rsta.1971.0080. S2CID 133730380.
- Gill, A.E.; Niller, P.P. (1973). "The theory of the seasonal variability in the ocean". Deep Sea Research and Oceanographic Abstracts. 20 (2): 141–177. Bibcode:1973DSRA...20..141G. doi:10.1016/0011-7471(73)90049-1.
- Gill, A.E. (1973). "Circulation and bottom water production in the Weddell Sea". Deep Sea Research and Oceanographic Abstracts. 20 (2): 111–140. Bibcode:1973DSRA...20..111G. doi:10.1016/0011-7471(73)90048-X.
- Gill, A.E. (1974). "The stability of planetary waves on an infinite beta-plane". Geophysical Fluid Dynamics. 6 (1): 29–47. Bibcode:1974GeoFD...6...29G. doi:10.1080/03091927409365786.
- Gill, A.E.; Clarke, A.J. (1974). "Wind-induced upwelling, coastal currents and sea-level changes". Deep Sea Research and Oceanographic Abstracts. 21 (5): 325–345. Bibcode:1974DSRA...21..325G. doi:10.1016/0011-7471(74)90038-2.
- Gill, A. E.; Schumann, E. H. (1974). "The Generation of Long Shelf Waves by the Wind". Journal of Physical Oceanography. 4 (1): 83. Bibcode:1974JPO.....4...83G. doi:10.1175/1520-0485(1974)004<0083:TGOLSW>2.0.CO;2. ISSN 1520-0485.
- Anderson, David L.T.; Gill, A.E. (1975). "Spin-up of a stratified ocean, with applications to upwelling". Deep Sea Research and Oceanographic Abstracts. 22 (9): 583–596. Bibcode:1975DSRA...22..583A. doi:10.1016/0011-7471(75)90046-7.
- Wunsch, C.; Gill, A.E. (1976). "Observations of equatorially trapped waves in Pacific sea level variations". Deep Sea Research and Oceanographic Abstracts. 23 (5): 371–390. Bibcode:1976DSRA...23..371W. doi:10.1016/0011-7471(76)90835-4.
- Gill, A. E. (1979). "A simple model for showing effects of geometry on the ocean tides". Proceedings of the Royal Society of London. A. Mathematical and Physical Sciences. 367 (1731): 549–571. Bibcode:1979RSPSA.367..549G. doi:10.1098/rspa.1979.0103. S2CID 131071309.
- Gill, A. E. (1980). "Some simple solutions for heat-induced tropical circulation". Quarterly Journal of the Royal Meteorological Society. 106 (449): 447–462. Bibcode:1980QJRMS.106..447G. doi:10.1002/qj.49710644905.
- Gill, A. E.; Rasmusson, E. M. (1983). "The 1982–83 climate anomaly in the equatorial Pacific". Nature. 306 (5940): 229–234. Bibcode:1983Natur.306..229G. doi:10.1038/306229a0. S2CID 4356967. 1983
- Gill, A. E. (1984). "On the Behavior of Internal Waves in the Wakes of Storms". Journal of Physical Oceanography. 14 (7): 1129. Bibcode:1984JPO....14.1129G. doi:10.1175/1520-0485(1984)014<1129:OTBOIW>2.0.CO;2. ISSN 1520-0485.
