= Edmund Dwen Gill =

Australian geologist

Edmund Dwen Gill (11 December 1908 – 13 July 1986) was an Australian scientist specialising in geology, museology, palaeontology and geomorphology. He was also known for his work as deputy director of the National Museum of Victoria, president of the Royal Society of Victoria and a research fellow in the CSIRO Division of Applied Geomechanics.

== Life ==
Gill was born in Mount Eden, Auckland. In December 1935 he married Kathleen Winnifred Brebner (1912-) in Warrnambool, Victoria with whom he had three sons and a daughter. His eldest son was Adrian Gill, a leading oceanographer and meteorologist, who predeceased him by three months.

=== Education ===
Gill was educated at Gisborne High School before going overseas to study the Licentiate of Theology at the Melbourne College of Divinity. He then gained a Bachelor of Arts at the University of Melbourne and a Bachelor of Divinity at Melbourne College of Divinity.

=== Career ===
Gill first worked for the Baptist Union of Victoria as a director of their youth and religious education departments. However he became increasingly interested in science and in 1938 he published his first paper, on Yeringian trilobites in the Victorian Naturalist. Much of his career was focused around the National Museum of Victoria, where in 1944 he was made an honorary associate in palaeontology. His views on evolution were incompatible with those of the Baptist Union and in 1948 he resigned from the ministry and became the museum's Curator of fossils, succeeding Alexander Robert Keble (1884–1963). He went on to be appointed assistant director in 1964, deputy director in 1969 and remained at the museum until his retirement in 1973.

During his career Gill's work covered a broad range of scientific disciplines, publishing approximately 400 scientific papers in his lifetime. His papers covered a wide range of subjects and many had a particular focus on the landscape of western and coastal Victoria, and the Warrnambool region. He kept comprehensive field notes on sea level changes and marine processes in the area in his geological notebooks. In retirement he became a research fellow in the CSIRO Division of Applied Geomechanics, and continued to work on coastal processes.

Dr Gill, left his research about the region with Deakin University Library in Warrnambool.

== Honours and awards ==
- Australian Natural History Medallion (1973)
- Fellow, Royal Geographical Society
- Fellow, Geological Society of London
- Fellow, Geological Society of America
- Foundation member, Geological Society of Australia
- Foundation member, Australian Institute of Aboriginal Studies
- Vice President, Anthropological Society of Victoria
- President, Royal Society of Victoria
