= David Frankel (archaeologist) =

Australian archaeologist

David Frankel FAHA is Emeritus Professor in Archaeology, Faculty of Humanities and Social Sciences, Department of Archaeology and History at La Trobe University.

Frankel studied archaeology at the University of Sydney (BA (Hons) 1970, MA (Hons) 1973) and University of Gothenburg Sweden (PhD), where he specialised in Cypriot prehistory. He worked in the Department of Western Asiatic Antiquities, at the British Museum (1975–78) before returning to Australia in 1978 to take up a lectureship at La Trobe University. As a student he excavated in New Zealand and Israel as well as Irrawang Pottery and Elizabeth Farm House in New South Wales and participated in two seasons of Sydney University’s excavations at Zagora in Greece.

Frankel was elected a Fellow of the Australian Academy of the Humanities in 1993, and served on the Humanities Panel of the Australian Research Council (1996–98). He was awarded the Prime Minister’s Centenary Award for services to Australia society and the humanities in 2003 and is joint Editor-in-Chief of Studies in Mediterranean Archaeology. In 2015 he was awarded the Australian Archaeological Association's Rhys Jones Medal for outstanding contributions to the discipline. His research interests include Australian Aboriginal archaeology with particular reference to south-eastern Australia and the archaeology of the Bronze Age of Cyprus having excavated in Papua New Guinea, Moonlight Head midden and Koongine Cave in Australia, and Marki Alonia, Deneia and Politiko Kokkinorotsos in Cyprus.

== Bibliography ==
- D.Frankel. 2025. Archaeological Incidents and Accidents.
- D. Frankel. 2019. Digging up a Village. A Book about Archaeology. For primary-school age children.
- D. Frankel. 2017. Between the Murray and the Sea. Aboriginal Archaeology in South-eastern Australia. Sydney University Press, Sydney.
- D. Frankel and J. Major (eds), 2017. Victorian Aboriginal Life and Customs through Early European Eyes. La Trobe University EBureau, Melbourne. https://library.latrobe.edu.au/ebureau/ebook.html#victorian
- D. Frankel and J. Major, 2014. Kulin and Kurnai. Victorian Aboriginal Life and Customs. Messmate Press, Melbourne.
- D. Frankel, J.M. Webb and S. Lawrence (eds), 2013. Archaeology in Environment and Technology: Intersections and Transformation. Routledge, New York and London.
- J.M. Webb and D. Frankel. 2013. Ambelikou Aletri. Metallurgy and Pottery Production in Middle Bronze Age Cyprus. Studies in Mediterranean Archaeology CXXXVIII, Uppsala.
- G. Georgiou, J.M. Webb and D. Frankel, 2011. Psematismenos Trelloukkas. An Early Bronze Age Cemetery in Cyprus. Department of Antiquities, Cyprus, Nicosia.
- J.M. Webb, D. Frankel, K.O. Eriksson and J.B. Hennessy, 2009. The Bronze Age Cemeteries at Karmi Palealona and Lapatsa in Cyprus. Excavations by J.R.B. Stewart. Studies in Mediterranean Archaeology CXXXVI, Sävedalen.
- D. Frankel and J.M. Webb 2006 Marki Alonia. An Early and Middle Bronze Age Settlement in Cyprus. Excavations 1995–2000. Studies in Mediterranean Archaeology CXXIII:2. Sävedalen.
- C.F.M. Bird and D. Frankel, 2005. An Archaeology of Gariwerd. From Pleistocene to Holocene in Western Victoria. Tempus 8. (Archaeology and Material Culture Studies in Anthropology) University of Queensland, St Lucia.
- D. Frankel and J.W. Rhoads (eds), 1994. Archaeology of a Coastal Exchange System: Sites and Ceramics in the Gulf of Papua. Research Papers in Archaeology and Natural History No. 25. Division of Archaeology and Natural History, Research School of Pacific Studies, Australian National University, Canberra.
- D. Frankel, 1991. Remains to be Seen: Archaeological Insights into Australian Prehistory. Longman Cheshire, Melbourne.
- D. Frankel, 1983. Corpus of Cypriote Antiquities: 7. Early and Middle Bronze Age Material in the Ashmolean Museum, Oxford. Studies in Mediterranean Archaeology XX:7, Göteborg.
- D. Frankel, 1979.The Ancient Kingdom of Urartu. British Museum Publications, London.
- D. Frankel, 1979. Archaeologists at Work: Studies on Halaf Pottery. British Museum Publications, London.
- D. Frankel, 1974. Middle Cypriot White Painted Pottery: An Analytical Study of the Decoration. Studies in Mediterranean Archaeology XLII, Göteborg.
