= Sandor Gallus =

Hungarian-born Australian archaeologist & teacher

Sandor (Alexander) Gallus (15 November 1907 – 29 December 1996) was a Melbourne archaeologist, most famous for his investigations of Pleistocene Aboriginal occupation at Koonalda Cave in South Australia and the Dry Creek archaeological site in Keilor, Australia, which helped demonstrate the great antiquity of Aboriginal occupation of Australia.

== Early life and career ==
Sandor Gallus was born in Sopron, Hungary in 1907, eventually obtaining degrees at both Szeged and Budapest Universities. He worked from 1931 to 1945 in the Prehistory Department of the Magyar Nemzeti Múzeum (Hungarian National Museum), becoming its director. His first substantial publication related to early Hallstatt Iron Age decorated pots from the barrow cemetery and fortified settlement, which overlooked Sopron (Gallus 1934). He also published on local Neolithic, Bronze Age, and Iron Age material, as well as a newly identified Palaeolithic site (Gallus 1937).

Escaping the advancing Communist take-over in 1945 he moved to Austria, and then four years later, migrated to Australia in 1949.

== Migration to Australia ==
Gallus's five years in Melbourne were spent in various unskilled jobs, a common experience of many Central European intellectuals and professional people. The lack of recognition of his qualifications and the dearth of prehistory taught in Australian universities limited his options. John Mulvaney was the first archaeologist in Australia to obtain a lectureship when he was appointed in 1953 in the Department of History at the University of Melbourne.

Gallus took up a teaching position in the Victorian Education Department where he remained in one capacity or another until he retired. He pursued his archaeological interests through the Archaeological Society of Victoria becoming its president and then Honorary Member, and attracted a devoted and enthusiastic group of amateurs, physicists, geologists, and even local professional archaeologists. In June 1983 the AASV dedicated a special volume of The Artefactto Gallus.

In 1963, Gallus became an Associate of Current Anthropology, in whose pages he was a frequent commentator on such various and varied topics as genetics, human migration, artefact typology, and symbolic systems. Three years later, in 1966, he was elected a Member of the (then) Australian Institute of Aboriginal Studies from which he obtained some research funds.

In his Australian research, Gallus had two main themes; the Pleistocene spread of humankind and examination of material remains as evidence of population movements. He was particularly interested in demonstrating his belief in a very early, Pleistocene occupation of Australia, through excavations first at Koonalda Cave on the Nullarbor Plain (Wright 1971) and secondly at Keilor on the terraces of the Maribyrnong River.

His views were controversial, and although his claims for the antiquity of 75–100,000 year occupation are still unproven, both sites did demonstrate aboriginal presence in the Pleistocene with Koonalda's rock art and mining occurring between 14,000 and 24,000 BP, while in 1971, Jim Bowler helped prove the 36,000 to the 45,000-year-old presence of flaked implements and extinct megafauna at Keilor.

Gallus was prominent in the Hungarian diaspora community in Melbourne, becoming the first Melbourne President of the Australian Hungarian Association. In 1965 he published an article entitled 'Hungarian history: an analysis in the Hungarian language Australian Hungarian Association Calendar, and often talked of writing a complete cultural, social and political history of his native land although this never eventuated.

Sandor Gallus died on 29 December 1996 in Melbourne and in early January 1997 a memorial service was held at the Hungarian Community Centre outside Melbourne, where the service was read - as Gallus would probably have wished - in Latin. and his ashes were placed in the crypt of the church.

== Published works ==
- Gallus, S. 1934 A Soproni Burgstall alakos urnai (Diefiguralver- zierten Urnen vom Soproner Burgstall). Archaeologia Hungarica(Budapest)
- Gallus, S. 1937 Nehany ujabb magyarorszagi paleolit le1ohely(Einige neuen Palaolithfundstellen Ungarns). Archeologiai Hungarica(Budapest) 37-9: 12 1.
- GALLUS, A. 1968a. Parietal Art in Koonalda Cave, Nullarbor Plain, South Australia. Helictite 6(3): 43–49.
- GALLUS, A. 1968b. Archaeological excavations at Koonalda, Nullarbor Plain, 1957–1967. Journal of the Anthropological Society of South Australia 6(7):4-8.
- GALLUS, A. 1970. Expanding horizons in Australian prehistory. Twentieth Century 25: 66–75.
- GALLUS, A. 1971. Results of the exploration of Koonalda Cave, 1956–1968. In R. V. S. Wright (ed.), Archaeology of the Gallus Site, Koonalda Cave, pp. 87–133. Australian Aboriginal Studies 26, Australian Institute of Aboriginal Studies, Canberra.
- Gallus, Report, 1974, 'Koonalda Expedition', January 1975 http://www.ksharpe.com/word/AR71.htm
- GALLUS, A. 1977. Schematisation and symboling. In P.J. Ucko (ed.), Form in Indigenous Art, pp. 370–386. Australian Institute of Aboriginal Studies, Canberra.
- Gallus, S. 1983 Excavations at Keilor, Victoria. Report No. 3: Excavation in the 'D' clay. The Artefact 8(1–2): 1 1-42,
- Megaw, J.V.S. 1983 Sandor Gallus - Archaeologist in two hemispheres. The Artefact 8( 1 -2):3-8.
- Megaw, J.V.S. 1997 Sandor (Alexander) Gallus, Obituaries, Australian Archaeology, No. 44, June 1997: 56–57. http://search.informit.com.au/documentSummary;dn=539313701711361;res=IELIND
- Wright, R.V.S. (ed.) 1971 Archeology of the Gallus Site, Koonalda Cave. Canberra: Australian Institute of Aboriginal Studies. Australian Aboriginal Studies 26, Prehistory Series 5.
