= Biosis Pty Ltd =

Australian environmental consultancy firm

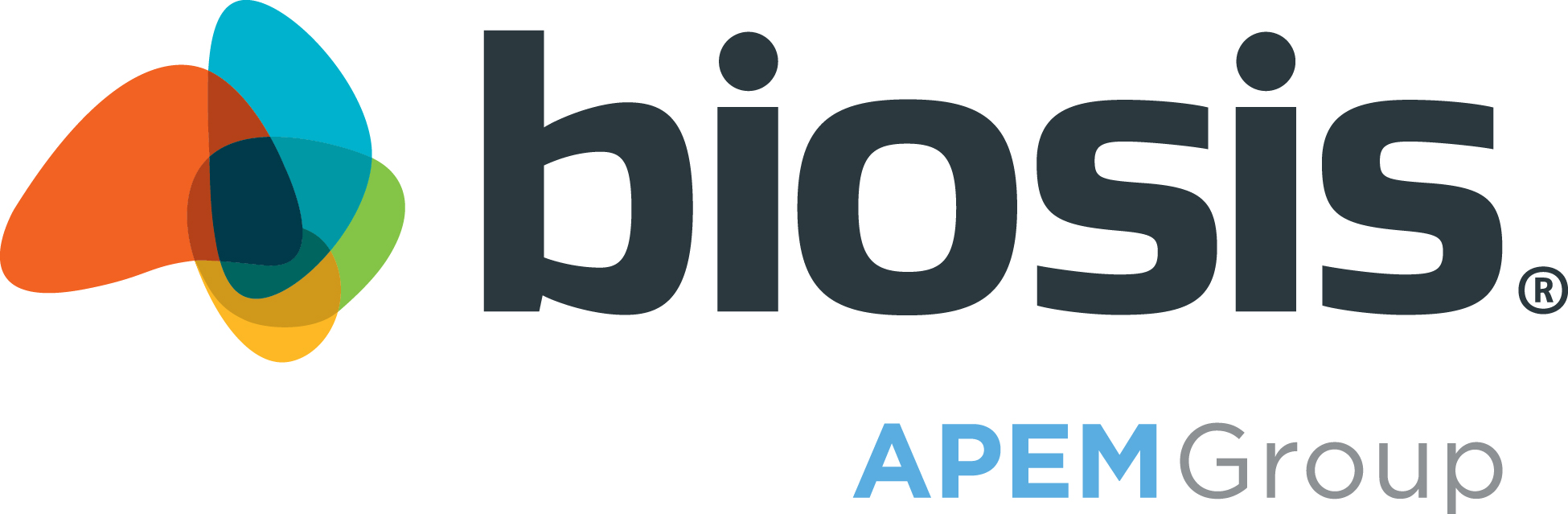
- Type: Proprietary limited company
- Industry: Environmental consulting
- Founded: 1983
- Headquarters: 38 Bertie Street, Port Melbourne, Victoria, Australia
- Key people: Charles Meredith – Retired Founding Director; Robert Baird – Former Chairman; Aaron Harvey – Former Director and CEO; Aaron Troy– Former Director and Chief Operating Officer
- Number of employees: 150
- Website: https://biosis.com.au/

Biosis Pty Ltd is an environmental consultancy firm in Australia. The company provides ecological, environmental planning, GIS, and heritage services for business, community, and government organisations. It works from several offices in south-eastern Australia, with its head office in Melbourne.

== Company history ==
Biosis Pty Ltd was founded in 1983 as Biosis Research Pty Ltd by ecologist Charles Meredith and several colleagues from an earlier venture called ABRG (Australian Biological Research Group). The company was among the first ecological consultancies in Australia. In 1995, Biosis purchased the archaeological consulting firm of du Cros & Associates, run by Hilary du Cros, after having been co-located for some years, adding archaeological and heritage research to its business. Meredith sold his share in the firm to senior members of staff in 2012. The firm has a proprietary limited structure registered in Australia.

In June 2024, the company announced that it was joining APEM Group: a global environmental consultancy headquartered in the United Kingdom. Biosis was the first Australian company to join the APEM Group.

== Operation ==
Biosis Pty Ltd has undertaken more than 18,500 consultancy projects in the fields of botany, zoology, aquatic ecology, Aboriginal and historic archaeology and cultural heritage in eastern Australia. It was one of the first specialist ecological and heritage consultancy firms to be established at a time when environmental issues were generally the realm of volunteer, community and government organisations.

The company has ten offices in south-eastern Australia, including Melbourne, Geelong, Ballarat and Wangaratta in Victoria, and Albury, Newcastle, Gosford, Sydney, Western Sydney and Port Kembla in NSW. Its head office is at 38 Bertie Street, Port Melbourne, Victoria.

== Research and publication ==
The company espouses best practice and independence in its work. It has produced several thousand ecological and heritage reports, including conservation management plans, archaeological surveys and heritage studies, for example the Bittern coastal wetland conservation plan. The company has been particularly active in developing bird strike risk models for wind farms throughout Australia, which has helped form case law under legislation dealing with climate change.

Biosis was awarded jointly the 2012 Australian Institute of Landscape Architects Land Management Award for its development of the Aurora Conservation Reserve Management Plan, and was a collaborative partner in Australian Research Council funded research on threatened bird species in 2009.
