= Keilor archaeological site =

Australian archaeological site in Victoria

The Keilor archaeological site was among the first places to demonstrate the antiquity of Aboriginal occupation of Australia when a cranium, unearthed in 1940, was found to be nearly 15,000 years old. Subsequent investigations of Pleistocene alluvial terraces revealed hearths about 31,000 years BP, making Keilor one of the earliest sites of human habitation in Australia. Remains of megafauna suggest a possible association with Aboriginal hunting.

== Location ==
The site is located at the confluence of Dry Creek and the Maribyrnong River, 1.5 km (0.93 mi) north of Keilor, Victoria at 37°42′15″S 144°50′16″E. The site was found when artefacts were exposed in sand quarries, and as a result of increased bank erosion of the river terraces due to runoff from the then recently opened Melbourne Airport.

== Discovery and excavation ==
The Keilor cranium was discovered by James White in October 1940 while excavating a sand deposit near the junction of the Maribyrnong River and Dry Creek, about 2 km (1.2 mi) north of Keilor, Victoria (Mahony 1943:3). Archaeologist Sandor (Alexander) Gallus, was among the first to recognise the importance of the river terraces in the 1960s and 1970s and excavated the site with teams from the Archaeological Society of Victoria, the Victoria Archaeological Survey and La Trobe University focusing on the lower stratigraphic layers known as the D-Clay and the underlying Older Dry Creek Alluvium.

== Dating ==
The Keilor cranium has been radiocarbon dated at between 12,000 and 14,700 years BP. Subsequent studies of the local geomorphology identified three terrace formations on the Maribyrnong River banks, which were linked to changes in sea level over the previous 150,000 years. In 1953, Edmund Dwen Gill calculated the age of the cranium to be about 14,700 years BP using radiocarbon dating and fluorine-phosphate analysis. Gallus excavated a hearth in 1971, from which charcoal was radiocarbon-dated to about 31,000 years BP, making Keilor one of the earliest sites of human habitation in Australia.

Remains of extinct megafauna species within the site were assessed as being possibly as recent as 20,000 years ago, although dating of the bones is problematic. However the site continues to be relevant to the megafauna extinction debate.

== Description of remains ==
The cranium and the few fragments of femur were heavily encrusted with carbonate when recovered. The cranium was initially considered large and robust but recent research comparing Keilor to a range of terminal Pleistocene and recent Australian Aboriginal crania have produced conflicting results. Thorne and Wilson concluded "cranial size in Pleistocene Australians was significantly greater than in Holocene Aboriginals... observable in the prehistoric crania from Kow Swamp-Cohuna, Mossgiel, Lake Nitchie and Keilor". However, later publications placed Keilor within the modern female range of variation for size and robusticity.

== Debate on origins ==
At the time of the discovery of the Keilor cranium, the origins of the continent's first human inhabitants was being debated. One argument suggested successive waves of culturally and biologically distinct people, reflected in the varying appearance of modern-day populations. Wunderly's concluded that Keilor "combined Australoid and Tasmanoid characteristics in about equal proportions". However this claim was disputed and the Keilor crania and Tasmanian populations were both considered to be within the range of the south-eastern mainland population.

== Management ==
The land was acquired in 1976 by the State Government under the Relics Act 1972 in recognition of the importance of the area to studies of Aboriginal history and local geomorphological processes. The acquisition was one of the first major efforts to conserve Aboriginal archaeology in Victoria and came with the formation of the Archaeological and Aboriginal Relics Office, which later became the Victoria Archaeological Survey (VAS). While the Victoria Archaeological Survey and La Trobe University Archaeology Department jointly excavated the site for several seasons between 1978 and 1981, the results were still inconclusive. The major question of the nature and extent of human/megafauna interaction remained unresolved. Plans for a major on-site education and interpretative centre were abandoned because of difficulties with soil erosion and a lack of stability. The land comprising the site is managed by First Peoples-State Relations. The archaeological site is known as "Murrup Tamboore" in the native language

== See also ==
- Lake Mungo remains
