= Roger Cribb =

Australian anthropologist and archaeologist (1948–2007)

- Cribb in 2006
- Born: Roger Llewellyn Dunmore Cribb; 6 January 1948
- Died: 24 August 2007 (aged 59)

Philosophical work
- Region: Australian Archaeology
- School: Processual archaeology
- Main interests: nomadic peoples; computer analysis; cultural landscapes

Roger Llewellyn Dunmore Cribb (6 January 1948 – 24 August 2007) was an Australian archaeologist and anthropologist who specialised in documenting and modelling spatial patterns and social organisation of nomadic peoples. He is noted for conducting early fieldwork amongst the nomadic pastoralists of Anatolia, Turkey; writing a book on the archaeology of these nomads; pioneering Australian archaeology and anthropologies' use of geographical information systems, plus genealogical software; and conducting later fieldwork documenting the cultural landscapes of the Aboriginal peoples of Cape York Peninsula.

== Overview ==
Dr Cribb's life's work is the work of a practical, applied social scientist who firmly believed anthropological models, grounded and parsimoniously applied, could reliably reach beyond our existing accumulated knowledge, into the archaeological past of some of our oldest cultures in some of the more sparsely populated regions of our world: i.e. the nomadic pastoralists of Anatolia (Turkey) and the gatherer-hunters of Cape York, (Australia).

Dr Cribb's research practice was to strive to undertake as much 'ethnographic' fieldwork as possible with the peoples whose heritage he wished to later unravel and reveal. His preference was to store his (and other peoples) data within purpose-designed databases, and then apply small, efficient purpose-designed computer programs to analyze the data and distill, reveal, confirm, plus extrapolate social and environmental organising principles and patterns. Organising principles and patterns 'discovered', were reapplied back into the original physical and biological landscapes, tested if possible, then extrapolated back in time

It is perhaps unfortunate that mid-career, for both mental and physical health reasons, Dr Cribb found himself and his broader projects (in Cape York) having to proceed without academic patronage or funding. From the early 1990s onwards Dr Cribb became increasingly disengaged from academic communities of scholars, tending to work instead within the grey (unpublished) fringes of more commercially driven (less 'pure') research projects and programs. Rapid developments in computer technologies and programming quickly overtook him, yet he continued for many years to work in those areas, with those peoples whose cultural landscapes he was most keen to understand, document, and help reveal to the world.

From Dr Cribb's works and his writings, it can be seen 'terra nullius' myths offended his belief in pre-existing, largely unrevealed human heritage deeply imprinted into otherwise apparently 'empty' landscapes

It might be said, Dr Cribb's most enduring professional contribution over a lifetime, was his work to counter all sense of 'terra nullius by recording large archaeological landscapes; facilitating archaeological heritage protection; and revealing forever the richness, density and vastness of some of the cultural landscapes still persisting in Anatolia (Turkey), and Cape York (Australia).

== Chronology of works ==
Image of Anatolia

- CRIBB, R (1974) Patterns of Racial Ideology: An Analysis in Terms of the Conflict Theory of Society. Unpublished Masters Thesis in Anthropology and Sociology, University of Queensland. Brisbane, Australia
- CRIBB, R (1982) The archaeological dimensions of near eastern nomadic pastoralism : towards a spatial model of unstable settlement systems Unpublished PhD Thesis, University of South Hampton, United Kingdom.
- CRIBB, R & WESTERN, J.S (1983) Cribbie: past community structure and the impact of resettlement on the inhabitants of Cribb Island, Brisbane. Unpublished report to the Commonwealth Department of Transport and Communications. University of Queensland, Brisbane, Australia
- CRIBB, R (1984) Greener Pastures: Mobility, Migration and the Pastoral Mode of Subsistence. Production Pastorale et Société Paris Number 14. Pages 11–46
- CRIBB, R (1984) Computer simulation of herding systems as an interpretative and heuristic device in the study of kill-off strategies. in CLUTTON-BROCK, j & GRIGSON, G (ed) Animals and Archaeology: Early Herders and their Flocks. British Archaeological Reports (B.A.R). Oxford.
- CRIBB, R (1985) The analysis of ancient herding systems: an application of computer simulation. in BARKER, G & GAMBLE, C (Eds) Beyond Domestication in Prehistoric Europe. Investigations in Subsistence Archaeology and Social Complexity. Academic Press. New York. Pages 75–106.
- CRIBB, R (1986a) A graphics system for site-based anthropological data. Australian Aboriginal studies. Number 2. Pages 24–30
- CRIBB, R (1986b) Introducing the Concept of a Dedicated Spatial Analysis Package for Archaeology. Archaeological Computing Newsletter. Number 9
- CRIBB, R (1986c) When the Tide Came in : Pleistocene-Holocene Sea-Levels, Archaeological Catchments and Population Change in Northern Australia. in DAY, M; FOLEY, R, & RUKANG, Ru (Eds) The Pleistocene Perspective: World Archaeological Congress, Southampton 1986. Allen & Unwin. London.
- CRIBB, R (1986d) Sites, people and archaeological information traps: a further transgressive episode from Cape York. Archaeology in Oceania'. Volume 21 Number 3. Pages 171-176
- CRIBB, R (1987) Aurukun Archaeology and Plant Survey 1987. Unpublished tapes and data sheets recording places and local experts descriptions of plants and places, deposited with the Australian Institute of Aboriginal Studies, Canberra
- CRIBB, R (1987) A preliminary report on archaeological findings in Aurukun Shire, western Cape York. Queensland archaeological research. Number 3. Pages 133-158
- CRIBB, R (1988) Report to the Australian Institute of Aboriginal Studies on the results of the 1987 Aurukun shell mound trip. Unpublished Report to the Australian Institute of Aboriginal Studies, Canberra.
- CRIBB, R & SUTTON, P (1988) The Aurukun database project. Unpublished report to the Australian Institute of Aboriginal Studies. Canberra.
- CRIBB, R; WALMBENG, R; WOLMBY, R & TAISMAN, C (1988) Landscape as cultural artefact: shell mounds and plants in Aurukun, Cape York Peninsula. Australian Aboriginal Studies. Number 2. Pages 60–73
- CRIBB, R & MINNEGAL, M (1989) Spatial analysis on a dugong consumption site at Princess Charlotte Bay, North Queensland. Archaeology in Oceania. Volume 24. Number 1. Pages 1–12
- SUTTON, Peter, MARTIN, David, von STURMER, John, CRIBB, Roger & CHASE, Athol (1990) Aak: Aboriginal Estates and Clans between the Embley and Edward Rivers, Cape York Peninsula. 1000 pp Restricted Access Publication. South Australian Museum. Adelaide, Australia
- CRIBB, R (1990) Archaeology of Mount Mulligan: A Quick Reconnaissance. Unpublished report to the Aboriginal and Torres Strait Islander Commission, Canberra
- CRIBB, R (1991a) Nomads in Archaeology. Cambridge University Press. Cambridge
- CRIBB, R (1991b) Getting into a flap about shell mounds in northern Australia : a reply to Stone. Archaeology in Oceania. Volume 26. Number 1. Pages 23–25
- CRIBB, R (1991c) One lousey matchbox : a review of the Aboriginal Land Act 1991, Torres Strait Islander Land Act 1991 procedures manual : a discussion paper. Unpublished paper prepared for the Tharpuntoo Legal Service. Cairns, Australia.
- CRIBB, R (1991d) Aboriginal Heritage in Queensland: Some Suggestions on the Collection, Control and Ownership of Data and Information: A Preliminary Discussion Paper. Unpublished paper prepared for the Tharpuntoo Legal Service Aboriginal Corporation
- CRIBB, R (1991e) Archaeological assessment of the Spalenka Dunefield, ATP 3968M, Mining lease 1383, Cape Flattery Silica Mines Pty Ltd Unpublished Report prepared for Hopevale Community Council and Tharpuntoo Legal Service, North Queensland, Australia
- CRIBB, R (1992)Preliminary Report on the Excavation of an Aboriginal Midden Site at Bailey's Creek Mouth. Unpublished report for Concrete Constructions Pty Ltd. Cairns, Australia.
- CRIBB, R (1993) Modelling relationships : a computerised approach to Aboriginal genealogy, family history and kinship studies. Australian Aboriginal Studies. Number 1. Pages 10–21.
- CRIBB, R (1993) Report to A.N.P.W.S and the Kuku Djungan Aboriginal Corporation on the Ngarrabullgan Heritage Survey Project: 21 May - 31 August 1993. Unpublished Report to the Australian National Parks and Wildlife Service. Canberra.
- CRIBB, R (1994) Report on Traditional Ownership and Aboriginal heritage: Wangetti Crocodile Farm Project. Unpublished report to the Queensland Department of Lands.
- CRIBB, R & HOLLINGSWORTH, L (1994) Report to the Wet Tropics Authority for the Wangetti Management Plan: Aboriginal Heritage. Unpublished Report for the Yirrganydji Tribal Aboriginal Corporation (in association with the Djbugay peoples). Cairns, Australia
- BAILEY, G; CHAPELL, J.B; CRIBB, R (1994) The origin of Anadara shell mounds at Weipa, North Queensland, Australia. Archaeology in Oceania Volume 29 Number 2. Pages 69–80
- CRIBB, R (1995) Towards a Strategy for the Management of Aboriginal Cultural Heritage in the Wet Tropics. in FOURMILE, H; SCHNIERER, S; & SMITH, A (Eds) An Identification of Problems and Potential for Future Rainforest Aboriginal Cultural Survival and Self-Determination in the Wet Tropics. James Cook University's Centre for Aboriginal and Torres Strait Islander Participation, Research and Development. Cairns, Australia. Pages 36–53.
- DAVID, B; GRAINER, J.R; WASON, S; GRAINER, E; GRAINER, J I & CRIBB, R; (1995) Ngarrabullgan: archaeological sites and the management of a Kuku Djungan place. In WARD, Graham & WARD, Lucina (Eds) Australian Rock Art Research Association, Occasional AURA Publication. Number 9. Pages 53–60.
- CRIBB R (1996a) An Assessment of the Definition of National Estate Boundaries for Groups of Shell Mounds on the Weipa and Andoom Peninsulas. Unpublished Report to Comalco Aluminium Inc, the Australian Heritage Commission, and the Cape York Land Council
- CRIBB, R (1996b) Shell mounds, domiculture and ecosystem manipulation on western Cape York Peninsula. VETH, P & HISCOCK, P (eds) Archaeology of northern Australia: regional Perspectives. Tempus: archaeology and material culture studies in anthropology. University of Queensland, St Lucia. Volume 4. Pages 150-174
- CRIBB, R (2000) An Assessment of Comalco's Cultural Heritage Proposals. Unpublished Report to the Cape York Land Council
- CRIBB, R (2000) The Shell Eaters. Early incomplete draft of an unpublished draft manuscript Roger Cribb was working on, but never finished. Cairns. Australia
- CRIBB, R (2006) Getting Around: Mobility, Lifestyle and Culture among Indigenous People. Unpublished seminar presented as part of James Cook University's School of Anthropology and Archaeology Seminar Program. Cairns, Australia.
