= Claudius Madrolle =

French explorer and travel guide editor (1870–1949)

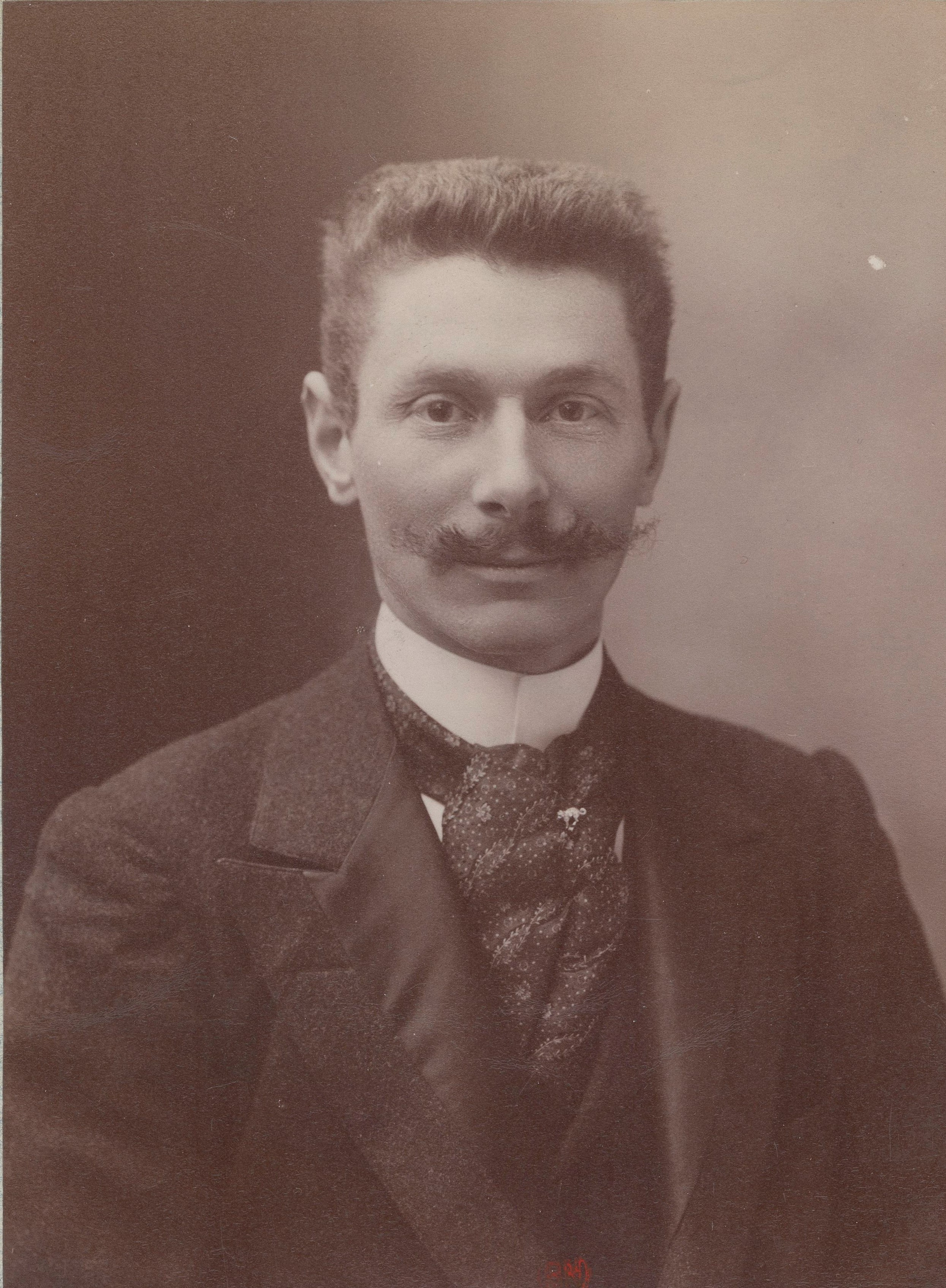
Portrait of Claudius Madrolle by Nadar

Claudius Madrolle (22 July 1870 – 16 June 1949) was a French explorer in Africa and Asia and editor of travel guides who specialized in East Asia. Publishers included Comité de l'Asie Française, Hachette and the Société d'Éditions Géographiques, Maritimes et Coloniales. In 1902, thanks to this young and wealthy French explorer, was published the first of a serie of travel guides to the Far East. From the beginning, he designed his project to match the spirit of well-known guides such as Baedeker, Joanne or Murray. A collection indeed, as a total of 70 guides, 11 of them in English, were published between 1902 and 1939. This period, during which Far East countries were slowly embracing tourism, was also a period of considerable political and social turmoil. For Claudius Madrolle, these changes added serious hurdles to the completion of his project.

== Works ==
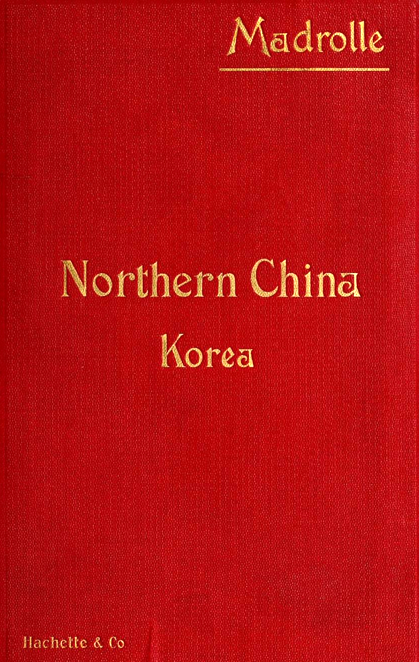
Cover of Madrolle's Northern China, 1912

- Claudius Madrolle (1894). Notes d'un voyage en Afrique Occidentale (in French).
- Claudius Madrolle (1895). En Guinee (in French).
- Claudius Madrolle (1900). Hai-Nan (in French).
- Claudius Madrolle (1902). Indo-Chine; Canal de Suez, Djibouti et Harar (in French).
- Claudius Madrolle (c. 1904). Chine du Sud (in French). (Index)
- Claudius Madrolle (1916). Chine du Sud, Java, Japon (in French) (2nd ed.). Paris: Hachette – via HathiTrust.
- Claudius Madrolle (1907). Tonkin du sud; Hanoi (in French). Comite de l'Asie Francaise.
- Claudius Madrolle (1912), Northern China, Paris: Hachette & Company, OCLC 8741409, archived from the original on 15 July 2008
