= The Artefact (journal) =

- Discipline: Archaeology
- Language: English

Publication details
- History: 1970-present
- Publisher: Archaeological and Anthropological Society of Victoria (Australia)
- Frequency: Biannually

Standard abbreviations
- ISO 4: Artefact

Indexing
- ISSN: 0044-9075

Links
- Journal homepage; National Library Australia; Australian Heritage Bibliography

The Artefact is a peer-reviewed academic journal published annually by the Archaeological and Anthropological Society of Victoria.

The Archaeological Society of Victoria was founded in 1964 and printed its first newsletter in September 1965. When Newsletter Number 3 was published on June 17, 1966, it was the first to bear the name of The Artefact. This was subtitled the official newsletter of the Archaeological Society of Victoria until 1975. From March 1976, renumbered Volume 1, Number 1, it was officially upgraded to a research journal specialising in the "ethnohistory and archaeology (prehistoric, ethno- and historical) of the Pacific region, with the intention to include major papers, short research reports, and book reviews relating to discoveries, claims, hypotheses, and publications in both Australian and world archaeology and anthropology. While it is a small publication from a volunteer- and amateur-run society, its reach has been extensive, having published some of the first evidence of the great antiquity of Aboriginal occupation in Australia with the Keilor excavation reports of Dr Sandor Gallus, and being cited by scholars around the world. As early as 1977, Wayne Orchiston noted, "That The Artefact is gaining acceptance as a professional research journal is manifest by its rapidly-expanding circulation—it now goes to all states of Australia and to 11 overseas countries; the exchange arrangements made with overseas institutions; and the orders coming in for back numbers and reprints.".

The journal is abstracted and indexed in the Australian Public Affairs Information Service, now provided via the Informit database, and is available in most state and academic libraries in Australia, New Zealand and many other countries. It was also indexed in the Anthropological Literature and Anthropological Index Online databases.
