= Koongine Cave =

Cave in South Australia

- location in South Australia Koongine Cave (Australia)
- 37°57′39″S 140°32′4.1″E
- Location: [[]]
- Region: South Australia

Koongine Cave is located in the Limestone Coast of South Australia.

The cave is situated in a limestone ridge approximately 4 km (2.5 mi) from the coastline. It was occupied approximately 10,000 years ago for a period of approximately 1,500 years leaving up to 2 m (7 ft) of sediments behind, rich in artefacts and ecofacts.

Finger markings made by Indigenous Australians can be found on the walls of the cave.
