= Thomas Ramsay Science and Humanities Fellowship =

Australian fellowship

The Thomas Ramsay Science and Humanities Fellowship is an Australian fellowship awarded by the Museum of Victoria, to fund research in science or the humanities related to the museum's collections.

== History ==
The Thomas Ramsay Science and Humanities Fellowship was created in 1978, under a bequest from the local philanthropist Sir Thomas Ramsay, who was interested in Australian history, education and science. He was a member of the Science and Humanities Committee of the Museum of Victoria from 1979 until 1987.

== Purpose ==
Its purpose is to foster research and writing across both the sciences and the humanities, with the intent that the work focus on some aspect of the Museum of Victoria's collections, research, and activities.

== Recipients and works ==
- Pamela Conder was awarded the fellowship due to the intersection of art and zoology in her work.
- Bernadette Hince. Hince researched the variety of English used in Antarctica and produced a dictionary of words, meaning, and expressions specific to the region. The fellowship funded research for a full year.
- Danielle Clode (1998). Clode told the story of Australian natural history through objects in the museum. The writer of the foreword of her book, Tom Griffiths, was another fellowship recipient.
- Gary Presland (2001)
- Gareth Knapman (2008). Knapman contributed a chapter to Curating Empire: Museums and the British Imperial Experience based on his Fellowship funded work at the museum.
