= Graham Connah =

British-born archaeologist

Graham Edward Connah AM (11 August 1934 - 25 November 2023) was a British-born archaeologist who worked extensively in Britain, West Africa and Australia.

Connah was born in Cheshire, UK on 11 August 1934, and educated at Wirral Grammar School, and Cambridge University, receiving a PhD in 1959, after which he was a research assistant until 1961. Among his influences were David Clarke and Paul Ashby. In 1961 he obtained a position as archaeologist in the Department of Antiquities, with the Federal Government of Nigeria. He next served as a research fellow, Institute of African Studies, University of Ibadan, Nigeria in 1964; then senior research fellow, Institute of African Studies, University of Ibadan in 1968; and senior lecturer, Department of Archaeology, University of Ibadan in 1970.

In the following year, he moved to Australia to take a position at the University of New England, Armidale, NSW, as lecturer in the Department of Classics and Ancient History. He became the head of the Department of Prehistory and Archaeology at UNE in 1974 after the previous head of Archaeology Isabel McBryde shifted to ANU at the end of 1973. In 1985 he was made foundation professor and head of the Department of Archaeology and Palaeoanthropology.

In the 1990s he was visiting fellow, at the Humanities Research Centre, Australian National University and School of Archaeology and Anthropology, Faculty of Arts, Australian National University; and the Department of Archaeology and Ancient History, Uppsala University, Sweden.

Connah's main research field was African archaeology, concentrating on the origins of urbanism and state in Nigeria and Uganda over the last 6000 years. African Civilizations is his best known work on this topic. He was also one of the pioneers of Australian historical archaeology, with his major contribution being The Archaeology of Australia’s History. He was founding editor of the journal Australasian Historical Archaeology from 1983 to 1988), and President of the Australasian Society for Historical Archaeology from 1993 to 1997).

== Awards ==
Connah was made a Fellow of the Royal Anthropological Institute of Great Britain and Ireland (FRAI), a Fellow of the Society of Antiquaries of London (FSA), Fellow of the Australian Academy of the Humanities (FAHA) and was awarded the Member of the Order of Australia (AM) and Australian Centenary Medal.
