= William Culican =

Australian archaeologist and academic (1928–1984)

William "Bill" Culican FAHA (21 August 1928 – 24 March 1984) was an Australian archaeologist and lecturer in biblical archaeology and pre-classical antiquity at the University of Melbourne.

== Life ==
Born at New Barn Farm, Great Harwood, Lancashire, Culican read classics and archaeology at the University of Edinburgh after a period in the Army, then won a scholarship to Queen’s College, Oxford. His studies centred on Egyptian, Mediterranean and middle eastern subjects, and he learned Egyptian, Sumerian and Akkadian. He came to Australia and obtained a position as lecturer in Semitic studies at the University of Melbourne in 1960, senior lecturer in 1964, transferred to the department of history in 1966, and became reader in 1972. He was a Fellow of the Humanities Research Council (1966) and Foundation Fellow of the Australian Academy of the Humanities (1969). In 1965 he founded the Archaeological Society of Victoria which evolved into the Archaeological and Anthropological Society of Victoria (president 1982–83).

In 1967–68, Culican and John Taylor along with students, family and friends undertook excavations on the Fossil Beach Cement Works site near Mornington, Victoria. Perhaps unusual for archaeologists, the resulting monograph was published within a couple of years. This may be the first historical archaeological excavation in Australia (or possible a close tie with Jim Allen's, Port Essington PhD). Culican's "modest" report (which won several prizes) was undertaken in the spirit that not to do so would be a "dereliction of archaeological duty", despite one visiting nun remarking of the site that "It is no Ur of the Chaldees."

During the 1970s he worked in Iran, the Levant, Sicily, Africa and Europe, Marsala, Sicily (1972), was director of the Melbourne excavations at el Quitar, Syria (1982), and the excavation of an Aboriginal ochre mine at Mount Gog, Tasmania (1983). Iran and Phoenicia were Culican’s two central fields of research. He published on the Phoenicians, The Medes and Persians (1965) and The First Merchant Venturers (1966). His definitive chapter on Phoenician colonisation appeared posthumously in the Cambridge Ancient History (1992). He also planned books on Persian cities and Iranian metal work.

Culican died of a heart attack and diabetes on 24 March 1984. His student, Antonio Sagona, who had just completed his PhD and was tutoring in the department, took over Cullican's teaching duties, and continued his legacy, developing the Archaeology course that Culican had pioneered. The William Culican Memorial Award is awarded to the student with the best thesis in the areas of archaeology or ancient history by the University of Melbourne annually in his honour.

The 2007 Combined Australian Archaeological Societies Conference, in Sydney, named one of their meeting rooms 'Culican' in honour of his contributions to historical archaeology.

== Bibliography ==
- The first merchant venturers : the ancient Levant in history and commerce by Culican, William, 1928–1984, London Thames & Hudson, 1966.
- The Medes and Persians (Ancient peoples and places series; vol.42) by Culican, William, London Thames and Hudson, 1965.
- Fossil Beach cement works, Mornington, Victoria: an essay in industrial archaeology by William Culican and John Taylor, Deception Bay, Queensland, Refulgence Publishers, 1972
