= Australian Geographer =

- Discipline: Geography of Australia
- Language: English
- Edited by: Chris Gibson

Publication details
- History: 1928-present
- Publisher: Geographical Society of New South Wales; Taylor & Francis
- Frequency: Quarterly
- Impact factor: 1.115 (2016)

Standard abbreviations
- ISO 4: Aust. Geogr.

Indexing
- ISSN: 0004-9182 (print); 1465-3311 (web)

Links
- Journal homepage

Australian Geographer (The Australian Geographer until 1975) is a quarterly peer-reviewed academic journal published by the Geographical Society of New South Wales since August 1928. Covering all aspects of Australian geography, it is currently copublished with Taylor & Francis.
