= National Academies Forum =

- Type: unincorporated
- Founded: 1995
- Defunct: May 2010
- Headquarters: Melbourne, Australia
- Key people: Stuart Macintyre, President
- Website: acola.org

The National Academies Forum was established in 1995 as the peak organisation for the four Australian learned academies. It represented:

- Academy of the Social Sciences in Australia
- Australian Academy of Science
- Australian Academy of Technological Sciences and Engineering
- Australian Academy of the Humanities

The Forum was funded by a grant-in-aid from the Department of Education, Science and Training. It was succeeded in 2010 by the Australian Council of Learned Academies.

== National Scholarly Communications Forum ==
The National Scholarly Communications Forum (NSCF) was an organisation, sponsored by the National Academies Forum, which organised events and conferences where issues pertaining to scholarly communication were discussed.
