= Dennis Jeans =

British-born Australian geographer

Dennis Norman Jeans (7 August 1934 – 3 April 2020) was a British-born Australian geographer and university academic who had a significant role in the interpretation of Australian landscapes in the second half of the twentieth century.

== Education ==
Jeans was born in Bournemouth, England on 7 August 1934, the eldest of four children in a relatively poor family. He obtained a government scholarship enabling him to attend the fee-paying Bournemouth School which taught a syllabus that included world regional geography comprising equal amounts of physical and human geography. However, his walks through the South Downs were probably more influential in deciding his direction and interests.

In 1952 he enrolled at University College London, along with another future geographer, Les Heathcote, studying under eminent historical geographer Clifford Darby, where he was introduced to early versions of quantitative geography. He adopted these concepts for his subsequent PhD thesis at the London School of Economics, analysing census data: The distribution of the wholesaling industry in Britain. On the basis of his thesis he was offered a position as Assistant Lecturer at the University of Liverpool in 1958.

== Move to Australia ==
Difficulties in obtaining a suitable permanent job in Britain and better prospects appearing elsewhere, saw Jeans travel to Australia in 1959, having been offered positions at universities in both New South Wales and Queensland. At Sydney University, Jeans established himself in the Geography Department, but worked extensively with other department figures and so had an influence in History and Archaeology. Collaboration with academics from other departments, including archaeologist Judy Birmingham, and historian Ian Jack, led to the first university course on historical archaeology in Australia.

== Publications ==
Jeans' research at the University of Sydney with economic geographer Mal Logan, (later Vice–Chancellor of Monash University), on the distribution of manufacturing in Sydney where they observed the rapid suburban expansion in the outskirts of the city, resulted in articles on population change in post-war Sydney and growth problems in Sydney’s new suburbs.

Jeans then undertook research on the role of early colonial surveyors in the layout of NSW towns, using archives of the Crown Lands Department and extensive fieldwork trips. His major work as a result of this work was An Historical Geography of NSW to 1901. He was editor of Australian Geographer from 1968 to 1973, and editor of Australia: a geography (1977). A second edition expanded to two volumes in 1986 The Natural Environment and 1987 Space and Society.

The collaboration with Birmingham and Jack produced two extensively illustrated, high quality publications aimed at enhancing the public appreciation of historical and industrial archaeology in Australia. Australian Pioneer Technology in 1979 and its sequel Industrial Archaeology in Australia, four years later helped establish the concepts and story of Australia’s unique industrial heritage in the public mind, after gestated in academia for some time.

Worldcat records 36 works in 92 publication for Jeans.

In the wake of the popular success of Australian Pioneer Technology the newly established Heritage Council of New South Wales commissioned Jeans and historian Peter Spearritt to research the evolution of the NSW landscape and prepare a short paper. The resulting project produces a substantial body of writing and photographs which led the Heritage Council to underwrite publication of Jeans and Spearritt's book The Open Air Museum: the cultural landscape of NSW.

Jeans contribute the NSW chapter to The Heritage of Australia, The Illustrated Register of the National Estate.

== Honours ==
Jeans was elected an Honorary Fellow of the Royal Australian Historical Society in 2005, a rare honour for a geographer.

== Later life ==
Ill health plagued him for many years, resulting in his early retirement in 1994. In his later years, although retired, he took historical geography beyond Immanuel Wallerstein’s world systems theory, linking capitalist transitions on Australia's periphery and engaging the ideas of Barthes, Baudrillard, de Certeau and Foucault. He was described as one of the most influential historical geographers of Australia [who] interpreted the landscapes of Australia in incisive new ways that perhaps only migrants could achieve in such an enlightened and expressive manner.

Jeans died on 3 April 2020 leaving a wife, two brothers, a sister and two children.
