= Hilary du Cros =

Australian archaeologist

Hillary du Cros is an Australian archaeologist and cultural tourism teacher who has worked in Hong Kong, Macau, Canada, Britain and Australia. She is currently Associate Professor, Hong Kong Institute of Education, teaching in the area of Cultural Tourism in the Department of Cultural and Creative Arts. She has made significant contributions to the challenge of developing cultural heritage sites, including in various journals and full-length books.

== Education ==
She completed a Phd at Monash University in 1996 on the topic Committing archaeology in Australia, which was published as Much More than Stones & Bones: Australian Archaeology in the Late Twentieth Century in 2002. Du Cros had begun her higher education in Australia, earning a BA from the University of Sydney.

== Career ==
du Cros worked as an archaeologist and cultural heritage consultant from 1984 to 1998, operating her own consultancy firm from 1991 to 1998, 'du Cros & Associates' in Melbourne, Australia. In 1998 she sold her consulting business to Biosis Research and moved to Hong Kong, teaching .

She was appointed Senior Research Coordinator for the UNESCO Observatory for Research in Local Cultures and Creativity in Education from 2011 to 2015 and has published in Annals of Tourism Research, Journal of Sustainable Tourism, Historic Environment, and the Journal of Heritage Tourism, as well as a number of books. Du Cros was an Honorary Research Associate at the University of New Brunswick Canada from 2010, and a Visiting Research Fellow at the University of Birmingham in 2013. She was Director of Asiatic Cultural Management in 2017 and the 2018 E.G. Whitlam Research Fellow at Western Sydney University studying national policy on indigenous places. She has been a Project Officer and Associate at Aboriginal Affairs NSW from 2024.

== Publications ==
du Cros has produced over a hundred publications including several books, as well as book chapters, journal articles, conference papers and over 250 consultants reports.

- Much More than Stones & Bones: Australian Archaeology in the Late Twentieth Century, Melbourne University Press. 2002 ISBN 9780522850208
- Cultural tourism : the partnership between tourism and cultural heritage management, with Bob McKercher, Routledge, 2002
- Cultural Heritage Management in China: Preserving the Cities of the Pearl River Delta, with Yok-shiu F. Lee, UK: Routledge, 2007, ISBN 9780415397193, 0415397197
- World Heritage-Themed Souvenirs for Asian Tourists: A case study from Macau. In Cave, J. (ed.) Tourism and Souvenirs: Global Perspectives from the Margins. London, Channel View Publications:176-189. 2013.
- The Arts and Events (with Lee Jolliffe) 2014
- Cultural Tourism: The Partnership Between Tourism and Cultural Heritage Management (with Bob McKercher) Routledge, 2002 Google Books
