= Caroline Bird (archaeologist) =

Australian archaeologist

- Education: University of Western Australia
- Scientific career
- Fields: Archaeology
- Thesis: Prehistoric lithic resource utilisation: a case study from the Southwest of Western Australia
- Doctoral advisor: Sylvia Hallam and Charles Amsden

Caroline Bird FAHA is an Australian archaeologist and educator. She specialises in women's studies, cultural heritage, and indigenous studies in the archaeological context, specifically early Australian archaeology. Bird's other focuses include lithic technology and art.

Bird has conducted archaeological fieldwork and laboratory research in the UK, Europe, Australia, and Egypt. Bird works on sites dating to various periods, ranging from Neolithic to historical Australia.

== Education ==
Bird studied archaeology and anthropology at Cambridge University, Deakin University, and the University of Western Australia. She received her BA in archaeology and anthropology (honors) from Cambridge University in 1977, followed by a Masters in Science and Technical Studies at Deakin University in 1997. Then, Bird went on to pursue a Ph.D. in archaeology at the University of Western Australia and was awarded her degree in 1985.

== Career ==
Bird has taught archaeology and cultural heritage university and technical education (TAFE) classes in Western Australia and Victoria. Bird also developed and oversaw the site officer training program at the Victoria Archaeological Survey, and helped to expand the school curriculum regarding Aboriginal and Intercultural Studies in Western Australia.

In February 2013, Bird joined Archae-aus, an organization based in Perth, Western Australia committed to providing specialist historical and maritime heritage consultation and education services. Within the organization, Bird has been involved in public presentations and publication (producing a book on the Archae-aus project "Kakutungutanta to Warrie Outcamp - 40,000 Years in Nyiyaparli Country") and continues to conduct fieldwork as a senior project officer. Bird has also worked as a member of the Australian Association of Consulting Archaeologists in Western Australia.

== Scientific contributions ==
Bird's most widely cited and praised article is "Woman the Toolmaker: Evidence for Women's Use and Manufacture of Flaked Stone Tools in Australia and New Guinea", published in 1993. This article took a feminist approach to archaeology where Bird aimed to confront and discredit the once commonly held gender-role assumption that "women hunt and men gather". Bird's article helped to develop feminist archaeological theory and fuel discussion concerning the prevalence of male bias in the research process, inadequate ethnographic accounts, and the discipline of archaeology as a whole.

Bird's other work include research on radiocarbon chronologies. Bird and David Frankel have written extensively on dating sequences in Australia, illuminating new evidence regarding early colonization and population histories and distributions.

Recently, Bird has been involved in heritage and indigenous studies research in connection to her membership with Archae-aus. In her 2016 article, "Reflections on CB08-500 Alternative Narratives, Aboriginal Heritage and Significance Assessment in Western Australia," Bird argued for the importance of incorporating indigenous narratives into the archaeological research process. Bird's article asserted that such inclusivity in archaeological reporting is necessary to progress the discipline and can also aid in engaging a wider audience in discussions concerning heritage and community values.

She was elected a Fellow of the Australian Academy of Humanities in 2022.

== Awards and recognitions ==
- John Mulvaney Book Award from the Australian Archaeological Association (2015, for Kakutungutanta to Warrie Outcamp - 40,000 Years in Nyiyaparli Country, received along with Edward McDonald)
- Best Poster at the Australian Archaeological Association Awards Conference (2016, won for "Issues of Scale and Resolution in Interpreting Surface Artefact Scatter in the Inland Pilbara", received along with Jim Rhoads, Fiona Hook and McDonald)

== Select publications ==
- Bird, C. and D. Frankel. 1991. "Problems in Constructing a Prehistorical Regional Sequence: Holocene South-east Australia." World Archaeology. 23 (2): 179-192. doi:10.1080/00438243.1991.9980170.
- Bird, C. 1993. "Woman the Toolmaker: Evidence for Women's Use and Manufacture of Flaked Stone Tools in Australia and New Guinea." 22-30.
- Bird, Caroline; Frankel, David; University of Queensland. Anthropology Museum (1996), An archaeology of Gariwerd : from Pleistocene to Holocene in Western Victoria, Anthropology Museum, University of Queensland, ISBN 978-0-909611-50-7
- Bird, C., A. Dias, F. Hook, M. Jimenez-Lozano, H. Tierney. 2014. "Time and Efficiency in Data Recovery: An Experiment Comparing Wet and Dry Sieving in Pilbara Rockshelter Excavations." JAACA. 2: 1-8. ISSN 2202-7890.
- Bird, C. and J. Rhoads. 2015. "Rockshelters as Indicators of Mobility Patterns in the Inland Pilbara." Archaeology in Oceania. 50 (S1): 37-46. doi:10.1002/arco.5055.
- Bird, C., F. Hook, J. Rhodes. 2016. "Reflections on CB08-500 Alternative Narratives, Aboriginal Heritage and Significance Assessment in Western Australia Reflections on CB08-500." Hunter Gatherer Research. 2: 327-243. doi:10.3828/hgr.2016.23. ISSN: 476-4261.
- Frankel, D. and C. Bird. 2013. "Integrating Hunter-gatherer Sites, Environments, Technology and Art in Western Victoria." In Archaeology in Environment and Technology: Intersections and Transformations edited by D. Frankel, J. Webb, and S. Lawrence. 69-43.
