= Irrawang Pottery =

In 1833–56, James King established and operated a pottery at Irrawang in the lower Hunter Region of New South Wales. This site is now known as the Grahamstown Dam.

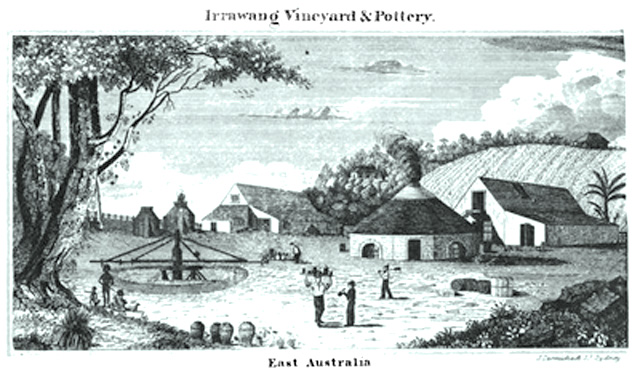
Carmichael Irrawang Vineyard and Pottery 1839

== History ==
James King, a Scottish immigrant, established Irrawang Pottery in 1833. The pottery operated until 1856, during which time it became well known for its production of ceramics that catered to both local and broader markets.

== Excavation and archaeological significance ==
The site of the Irrawang Pottery was excavated starting in August 1967 by students and volunteers under the Archaeology Society of the University of Sydney, directed by Judy Birmingham. The excavation work continued for over a decade and remains under-published. Originally intended as a training exercise for archaeologists before their fieldwork in the Middle East, the project generated enough momentum to lead to the establishment of the Australian Society for Historical Archaeology in 1970 and the introduction of a historical archaeology course at the University of Sydney in 1974.

== Pottery production ==
Irrawang Pottery produced a variety of ceramic wares, including household items such as jugs, jars, and tiles. The pottery techniques used were influenced by European traditions but adapted to local materials and conditions.

== Materials and techniques ==
The clay used at Irrawang was sourced locally and was known for its high quality. Pottery items were hand-thrown on a wheel and often decorated with simple glazes and patterns. Kilns at Irrawang were designed to reach high temperatures necessary for stoneware production.

== Economic and cultural impact ==
Irrawang Pottery played a significant role in the local economy, providing employment and fostering skills development in the region. The pottery items produced were used both locally and exported, contributing to the cultural heritage of New South Wales.

== Legacy and preservation ==
Today, the legacy of Irrawang Pottery is preserved through archaeological studies and museum collections. Artifacts from the site are displayed in various museums, providing insights into early colonial industry and craftsmanship in Australia.
