= Jim Allen (archaeologist) =

Australian archaeologist

Jim Allen (11 September 1938 – 19 November 2025) was an Australian archaeologist specialising in the archaeology of the South Pacific.

Allen led the first professional excavation of a European site in Australia, the 1840s military settlement of Victoria, which was established at Port Essington at the northernmost point of the Northern Territory. He also worked on the Lapita culture, tracing the expansion of Polynesian settlement through its distinctive pottery style. In the 1990s, he played a prominent role in the debate over the forced repatriation of Aboriginal remains.

Allen was the Foundation Professor of Department of Archaeology at La Trobe University from 1985 to 1993. Prior to that, he was the Head of the Department of Prehistory at the Australian National University from 1982 to 1984. From 1993, he was a professorial fellow of the Australian Research Council and research associate at La Trobe. In 2012 he was elected a foreign associate of the United States National Academy of Sciences.

Allen died on 19 November 2025 at the age of 87.
