= Anthropological Society of Victoria =

The Anthropological Society of Victoria was formed in 1934, in response to the efforts of gifted lecturer Frederic Wood Jones who attracted an enthusiastic non-academic audience to his public lectures in the 1930s.

In 1976 it amalgamated with the Archaeological Society of Victoria to form the Archaeological and Anthropological Society of Victoria.
