= Australasian Society for Historical Archaeology =

- Founded: 1970
- Type: Professional Body
- Location: Sydney, Australia
- Services: Historical Archaeology, conservation and protection of cultural heritage places in Australia
- Website: www.asha.org.au

The Australasian Society for Historical Archaeology (ASHA) was founded as the Australian Society for Historical Archaeology in 1970 by Judy Birmingham (University of Sydney). Its aims are to promote the study of historical archaeology in Australia.

== Origins ==
ASHA came out of the developing interest in archaeology in Australia in the 1970s, and in particular the increasing interest generated by uncovering of Colonial period archaeology in Port Arthur, Sydney Cove, The Rocks and other parts of New South Wales, as well as the first historical archaeology course at the University of Sydney, in 1974.

In 1991 the society was extended to include New Zealand and the Asia-Pacific region generally, and its name was changed to the Australasian Society for Historical Archaeology. In the mid-1990s the Society's committee moved from being Sydney based to being a more Australasian wide committee (Neville Ritchie, the then president lived in New Zealand) reflecting the growth of historical archaeology in the region.

The society's activities include public lectures and an annual conference with papers presented by national and international speakers. It promotes the exchange of information and reference material relating to historical archaeology in Australia and overseas.

== Publications ==
Australasian Historical Archaeology
- Discipline: Archaeology
- Language: English

Publication details
- History: 1980–present
- Publisher: Australasian Society for Historical Archaeology (Australia)
- Frequency: Annually

Standard abbreviations
- ISO 4: Australas. Hist. Archaeol.

Indexing
- ISSN: 1322-9214

Links
- Journal homepage; National Library Australia; Australian Heritage Bibliography

ASHA publishes the ASHA Newsletter and the journal Australasian Historical Archaeology, (distributed free to members of the Society), as well as the Occasional Papers series and monographs. Initially ASHA published only a Newsletter which was important in conveying relevant news and information (often research findings). In 1983 the society began publishing the Australian Journal of Historical Archaeology under the editorship of Graham Connah. This provided the only venue for publishing the results of historical archaeological research in Australia. In 1981 the journal was renamed to reflect the contribution of New Zealand Historical Archaeology and became the Australasian Historical Archaeology, and has remained the main journal in Australia for publication of research and excavation results from Historical Archaeological Projects.

The first volume included 'A first bibliography of historical archaeology in Australia', which was subsequently updated. It has been important in developing theory and practice in Historical Archaeology, with early analytical articles such as Graham Connah's 'Stamp-collecting or increasing understanding', which he followed up with the answer in 1998 in 'Pattern and purpose in Historical Archaeology'. This was followed by Mackay and Karskens' review of Connah's appraisal, focusing on the ...contribution of other forms of public archaeology in Australia in the late twentieth century.

== See also ==
- Australian archaeology
- Historical archaeology
- Historical archaeology in Australia
