= Archaeological Society of Victoria =

The Archaeological Society of Victoria was formed in 1964 from the efforts of University of Melbourne academic William (Bill) Culican in response to the enthusiastic response to his archaeology lectures run through the CAE. In 1976 it combined with the Anthropological Society of Victoria to create the Archaeological and Anthropological Society of Victoria or AASV. Among its contribution to the archaeology discipline in Victoria, it undertook excavations at Dry Creek, Keilor in the early 1970s, to uncover evidence of Pleistocene Aboriginal occupation.
