= Archaeological and Anthropological Society of Victoria =

Melbourne incorporated association

The Archaeological and Anthropological Society of Victoria or AASV is an incorporated association formed in 1976 in Melbourne, Australia through the amalgamation of two earlier societies, the Anthropological Society of Victoria formed in 1934, and the Archaeological Society of Victoria formed in 1964. The former was created from the efforts of gifted lecturer Frederic Wood Jones who attracted an enthusiastic non-academic audience to his public lectures in the 1930s. The latter was created in response to the Centre for Adult Education (CAE) archaeology lectures of University of Melbourne academic William (Bill) Culican. The AASV publishes the occasional journal The Artefact.

The AASV offer the Alpha prize for the best PhD presentation. Past winners include Jesse Martin (La Trobe University), Jason Gibson (Monash University); 2016: Stacey Gorski (University of Melbourne); Anneliese van der Ven (University of Melbourne) – Re-awakening the Power of Persepolis; Natalie Langowski (University of Melbourne); Marcia Nugent (University of Melbourne); Aleksandra Michalewicz (University of Melbourne); Caroline Spry (La Trobe University).
