= Ted Williams (elder) =

Aboriginal Australian elder and activist of the Yugambeh people

Ted Williams is an Aboriginal Australian elder of the Yugambeh people. He is known for his advocacy work with Yugambeh culture and various media appearances. In 2017, he launched the Queen's Baton for the 2018 Commonwealth Games alongside then Queen Elizabeth II and fellow elder Patricia O'Connor.

== Personal life ==
Williams is a member of the Yugambeh people. He is a descendent of local Aboriginals, William Williams and Emily Logan, the daughter of Bilin Bilin. William and Emily were Mununjali people employed by Australian politician Robert Martin Collins. In 2021, Ted unveiled a renewed plaque for the Williams Memorial Stone at Tamrookum, which had originally been erected by his father, Cyril Williams

== Career ==
Alongside students at Griffith University Williams worked to narrate a traditional story for the development of a digital game. In 2017, he travelled to London as part of the official Queensland delegation, where he launched the Queen's Baton for the 2018 Commonwealth Games alongside then Queen Elizabeth II and fellow elder Patricia O'Connor. Williams and O'Connor called for unity amongst Yugambeh people during a public feud regarding the Commonwealth Games Mascot - Borobi. Ted was present when Borobi was announced as the Australian Team mascot for the 2022 Commonwealth Games in Birmingham. As Chair of the Yugambeh Region Aboriginal Corporation, Williams expressed the communities concern for the Indigenous employees of Dreamworld Corroboree and the materials on display in the precinct should the park not reopen the attraction.
