= Tulgigin clan =

Aboriginal Australian people

The Tulgigin clan are one of nine distinct named clan estate groups of the Yugambeh people and the name refers to the Indigenous people of the Tweed area in the Tweed Shire, New South Wales, Australia.

== Name ==
The ethnonym Tulgigin has been related to a Yugambeh word, Tulgi, which refers to the "dry forests" with -gin meaning "people" and thus means "Dry Forest People". Their country was typified by the sclerophyll environment.

== Language ==
The Tulgigin people spoke Nganduwal, of which a few hundred words have been preserved; it is a dialect of the Yugambeh language.

Comparisons with neighbouring clan word lists in the Tweed Valley showed they spoke the same variety of language.

== Country ==
Their tribal boundaries are said to have extended south of the Tallebudgera Creek to the Tweed River, west to Mt. Wollumbin, and the sea the east.

According to John Allen's map, the Tweed clan were located south of the Kombumerri clan.

== See also ==
- Yugambeh people
- Wanggeriburra clan
- Kombumerri clan
- Mununjali clan

== Sources ==
- Allen, John; Lane, John (1914). "Grammar, Vocabulary, and Notes of the Wangerriburra Tribe" (PDF). Annual Report of the Chief Protector of Aborigines for the year 1913. Brisbane: AIATSIS. pp. 23–36.
- Crowley, Terry (1978). The middle Clarence dialects of Bandjalang. Australian Institute of Aboriginal Studies.
