= Gugingin clan =

Aboriginal Australian people

The Gugigin clan are one of nine distinct named clan estate groups of the Yugambeh people and the name refers to the Indigenous people of the Logan area, Queensland, Australia.

== Name ==
The ethnonym Gugigin has been related to a Yugambeh word, Gugin, which refers the north with -gin meaning "people" and thus means "Northern People". They were the northernmost clan of the Yugambeh.

== Language ==
The Gugigin people spoke a dialect of the Yugambeh language.

== Country ==
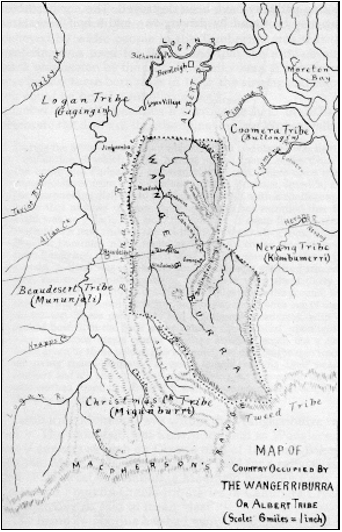
Partial Yugambeh clan map circa 1913

Their tribal boundaries are said to have extended west to Oxley creek, south to Jimboomba and the Pimpama river, north to Mt Cotton and east to Russell Island and surrounds. According to John Allen's map, the Gugigin were the northernmost clan, located north of the Mununjali clan on the Logan River, the Wangerriburra in Albert Valley.

== See also ==
- Yugambeh people
- Wanggeriburra clan
- Kombumerri clan
- Mununjali clan

== Sources ==
- Allen, John; Lane, John (1914). "Grammar, Vocabulary, and Notes of the Wangerriburra Tribe" (PDF). Annual Report of the Chief Protector of Aborigines for the year 1913. Brisbane: Anthony James Cumming for the Queensland Government. pp. 23–36.
- Crowley, Terry (1978). The middle Clarence dialects of Bandjalang. Australian Institute of Aboriginal Studies.
