= Yuke =

Yuke may refer to:

- Yukhoe, a variety of hoe (raw dishes in Korean cuisine)
- A slang word for Euclid Trucks, and more broadly an articulated or off-road Dump truck, also spelled "Euc"
- Yukes, a race in the Final Fantasy Crystal Chronicles universe
- Yuke, a callsign for Union Of Yuktobania Republic people from Ace Combat series
- Patricia O'Connor (elder), née Yuke (born 1928), Australian Aboriginal elder
- Electric unicycle, a single-wheel motorized personal transporter
- Yuke, an American rapper based in New York City
