= Yugambeh =

Yugambeh may refer to:

- Yugambeh people, an Aboriginal Australian people of South-East Queensland and the Northern Rivers of New South Wales
  - Yugambeh language, their language
  - Yugambeh Museum, a museum of their culture and language
- Yugambeh–Bundjalung languages, a language family
