= Yugambeh people =

Group of Aboriginal Australian clans

Yugambeh clans
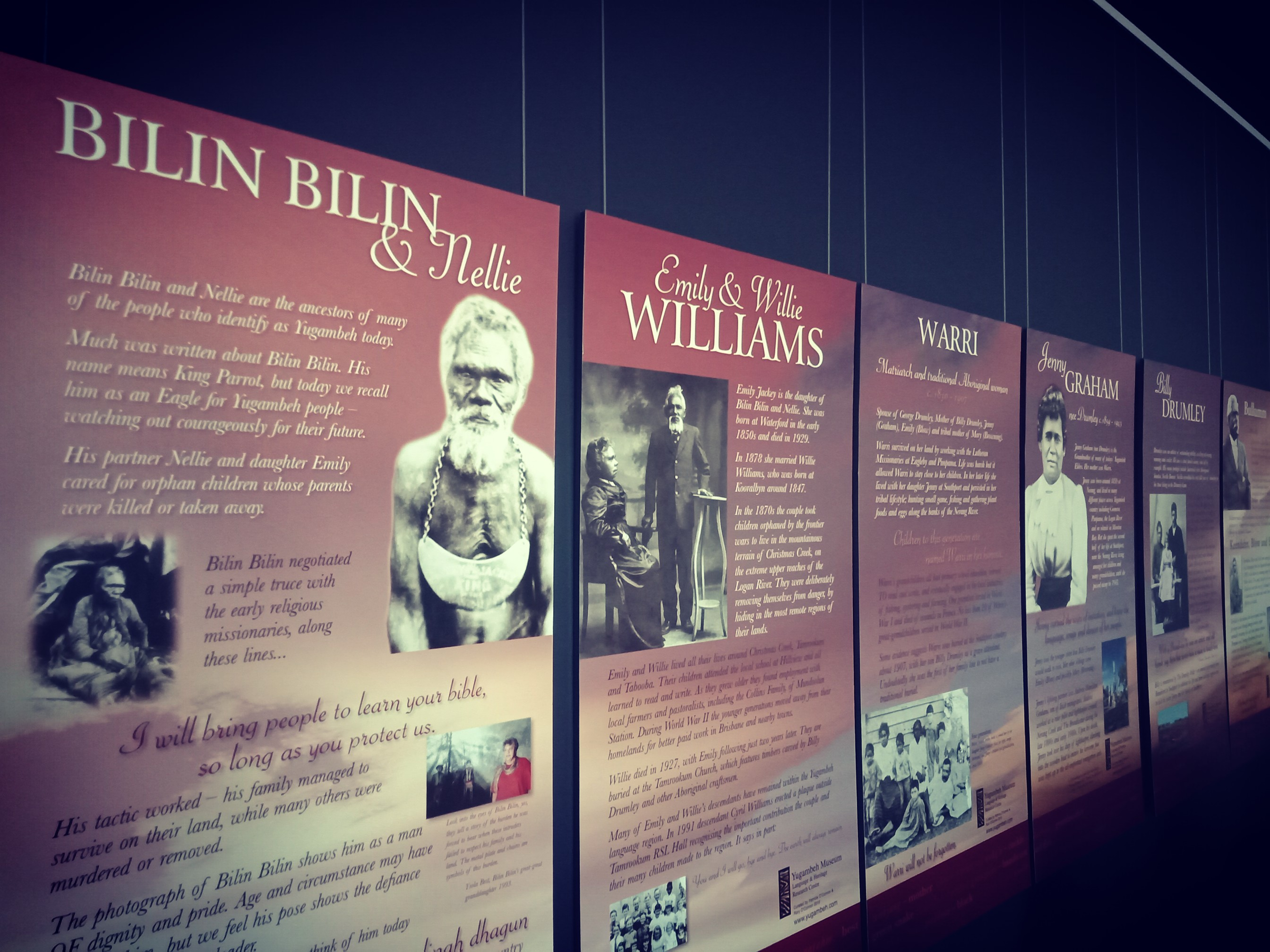
- Ancestor exhibition at the Yugambeh Museum Language and Heritage Research Centre

Total population
- ~10,000 (2016)

Languages
- Yugambeh, Australian English

Religion
- Dreaming, Christianity

Related ethnic groups
- Yugara, Gidhabal, Bundjalung

- Person: Mibunn

The Yugambeh (/ˌjʊɡʌmbɛər/ YOO-gum-BERR (see alternative spellings)), also known as the Minyangbal (/ˌmɪnjʌŋbʌl/ MI-nyung-BUHL), or Nganduwal (/ˌŋɑːndʊwʌl/ NGAHN-doo-WUL), are an Aboriginal Australian people of South East Queensland and the Northern Rivers of New South Wales, their territory lies between the Logan and Tweed rivers. A term for an Aboriginal of the Yugambeh tribe is Mibunn (also written as Miban/Mibanj, Mibin, Mibiny, Mebbon, Meebin), which is derived from the word for the wedge-tailed eagle. Historically, some anthropologists have erroneously referred to them as the Chepara (also written as Chipara, Tjapera), the term for a first-degree initiate. Archaeological evidence indicates Aboriginal people have occupied the area for tens of thousands of years. By the time European colonisation began, the Yugambeh had a complex network of groups, and kinship. The Yugambeh territory is subdivided among clan groups with each occupying a designated locality, each clan having certain rights and responsibilities in relation to their respective areas.

Europeans arrived within their proximity in the 1820s, before formally entering Yugambeh territory c.1842. (Note: Evidence given by Allan Cunningham, 13 February 1832, "Report from Select Committee on Secondary Punishments 1821–32".. cited by J. G. Steele, Brisbane Town in Convict Davs 1824–1843, (St Lucia, Queensland University Press, 1974), p. 164; R. I. Longhurst, 'Settlement and Development of Queensland's Gold Coast to 1889 '.. Settlement of the Colony oi QiLeensisnd- (Brisbane, Library Board of Queensland, 1978), pp. 4–5.) Their arrival displaced Yugambeh groups, and conflict between both sides soon followed throughout the 1850/60s By the 20th century, they were being forced onto missions and reserves despite local resistance. Other Yugambeh people found refuge in the mountains or gained employment among the Europeans. The last of the missions/reserves in the area closed in 1948 and 1951, though people continued to occupy them. Throughout the 70s-90s, the Yugambeh founded organisations and businesses in culture/language, housing and community care, wildlife and land preservation, and tourism. It is estimated there were between 1,500 and 2,000 Aboriginal people in the watersheds of the Logan, Albert, Coomera and Nerang before the 1850s. The 2016 Australian census records 12,315 Aboriginal people in the four local government areas, a portion of these are non-Yugambeh Aboriginal peoples who have moved into the area for work, or as a result of forced removals.

== Name and etymology ==
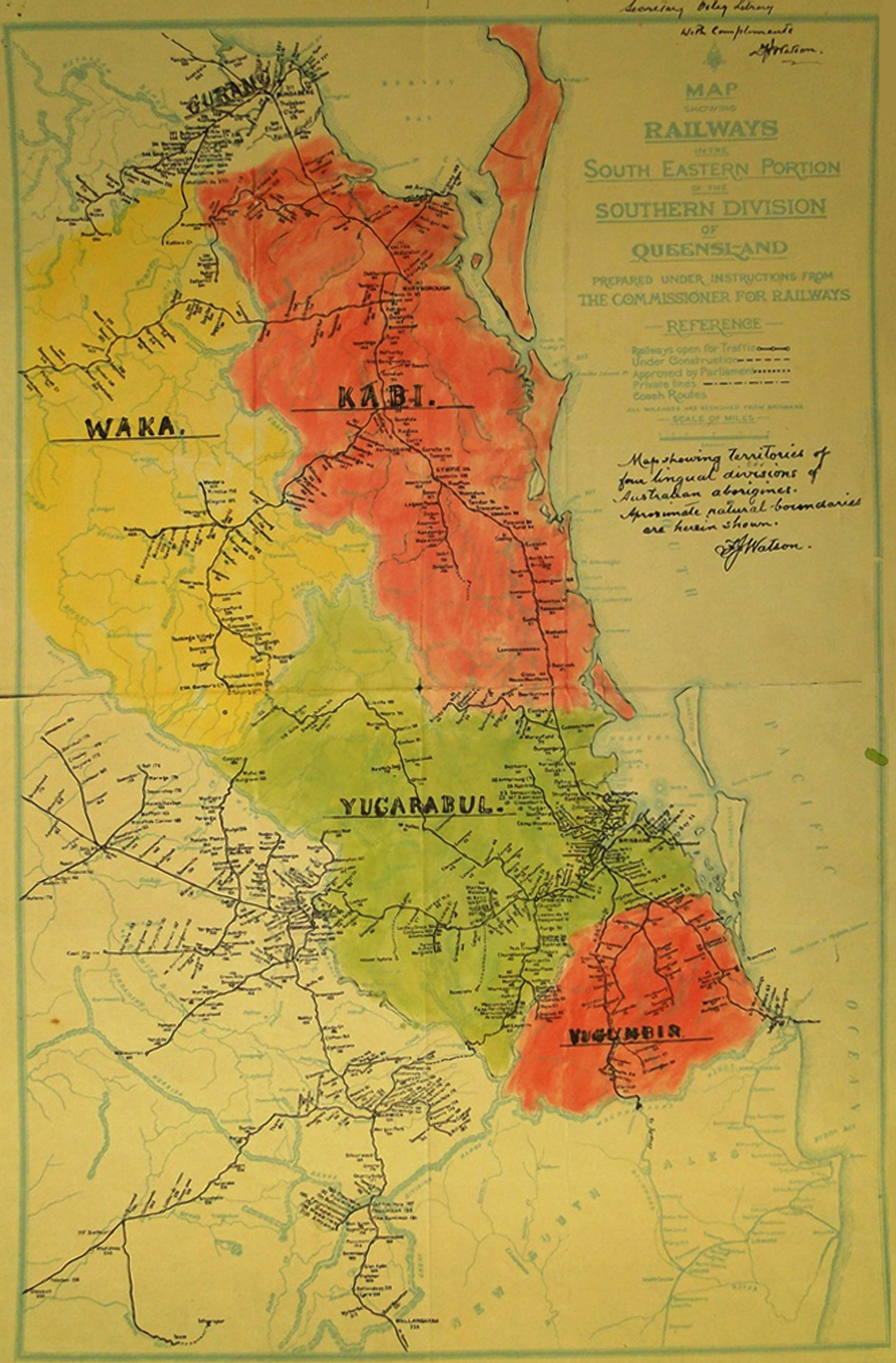
Watson's map of south-east Queensland tribes, circa 1944

Yugambeh is the traditional language term for the Aboriginal people that inhabit the territory between the Logan river and the Tweed river. Their ethnonym derives from the Yugambeh word for "no", namely yugam/yugam(beh), (Note: "The name Yugambeh (or Yugam) follows another common convention of language names in the area, by naming the language by its word for 'no'.. Yugambeh (or its older form Yugumbir) is just the word for 'no' (or more accurately 'no' plus the suffix -beh or -bir)." (Sharpe 1998, p. 2)) reflecting a widespread practice in Aboriginal languages to identify a tribe by the word they used for a negative, this is typical of the area, as Kabi, Wakka, Jandai, Guwar all mean "no" as well. Yugambeh refers to people descended from speakers of a range of dialects spoken in the Albert and Logan River basins of South Queensland, stretching over the area from the Gold Coast west to Beaudesert, while also including the coastal area just over the border into New South Wales along the coast down to the Tweed Valley. Tindale listed a number of alternative names and spellings for the Jukambe including: Yugambir, Yugumbir, Yoocumbah, Yoocum, Jukam, Yukum, Yögum, Yuggum, Jugambeir, Chepara, Tjapera, Tjipara, Chipara. The Yugambeh use the word Miban/Mibanj /Mibin meaning wedge-tailed eagle to denote an indigenous person of the group, (Note: The word, referring to the indigenous people, means "Eaglehawk" (Prior et al. 1887, p. 213).) and is the preferred endonym for the people; Gurgun Mibinyah (Language of Mibin [Man/Eagle]) being used to describe their dialects; Yugambeh, Nganduwal, and Ngarangwal.

=== Bundjalung misnomer ===
Yugambeh descendants state that the name Bundjalung, applied by Europeans and adjacent peoples, is a misnomer. The Aboriginal dialects spoken from Beenleigh/Beaudesert south to the Clarence River are said by linguists to be a single language or linguistic group. In traditional culture, there was no general name for this "language", this being noted as early as 1892. Smythe, writing in the 1940s in the Casino area, noted that some of his informants stated "Beigal" (Man or People) was the tribal name, others though stated there never was a shared named in use. As "Bandjalang", aside from being a specific group's name, was offered as a cover all term, Smythe did the same, calling the entire linguistic group "Bandjalang" for convenience Each speech community originally had their own distinctive names for their dialects, and adopted the term "Bundjalung" in the period after European arrival with Crowley believing that originally, Bandjalang was only the name of the dialect spoken on the South Arm of the Richmond River (that is Bungawalbin Creek), but in time, other group local groups amalgamated under the term in the face of the European invasion. Bundjalung would eventually supplanted most other local dialect names. The Aboriginal people who lived in the area that became Queensland never used the name Bundjalung, and northern groups have maintained their dialect names. While some Bundjalung people refer to the Yugambeh as (Northern) Bundjalung, local Aboriginal people emphatically prefer to use Yugambeh.

=== Other misnomers ===
There are terms used for more than one group, like "Minyangbal", – those who say minyang "what", which is used to refer to the Yugambeh, Galibal, and Wiyabal people, while also being the self-name for the Minyungbal people at Byron Bay and on the Brunswick River. Discussion about the correct names for dialects is difficult because there are who groups stopped using names altogether. This was compounded by the fact that what one group may call itself may be different from what another group calls it, which may again be different from what a third group uses. Margaret Sharpe noted that one group which said gala for "this" might refer to another as Galibal, because they pronounced the word gali. Similarly, a group which said nyang for "what" might call the "Galibal" group Minyangbal, because these "Galibal" said minyang (miñang) for "what". Such was the case for the Gidhabal people at Woodenbong who referred to the Beaudesert and Logan people as the Yugambeh or Minyangbal, because the Gidhabal people said yagam for "no" and nyang for "what", while the Yugambeh people said yugam for "no" and minyang for "what". Other terms are not tribal names, like "Chepara", used by the 19th century anthropologist Alfred William Howitt, which is actually "Gibera" – a first-degree initiate, the initial consonant being realised as a fricative. When asked who the local people were, the informant, who at the time would not have had a very effective command of English, had simply told him the group he was meeting were all first-degree initiates.

== Language ==
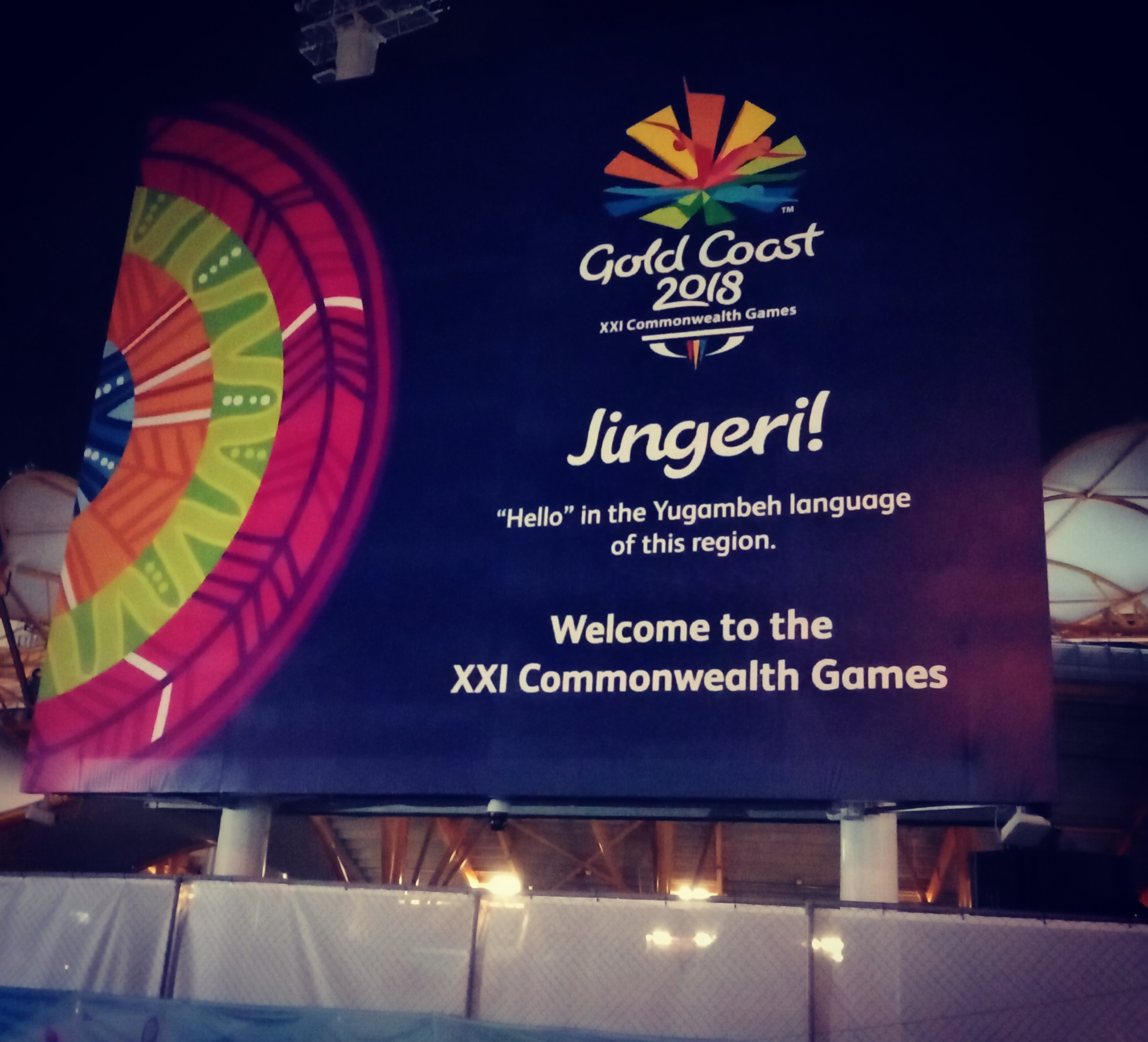
Yugambeh language used on signage during 2018 Commonwealth Games

The Yugambeh language (also termed the Mibin dialects) is a dialect cluster of the wider Bandjalangic branch of the Pama–Nyungan language family, which is neutrally called the Tweed-Albert Group.Yugambeh was included in the Australian Standard Classification of Languages as Yugambeh (8965) in 2016. Results from the 2021 Census indicated there were 208 Yugambeh speakers, up from the 2016 results of 18 speakers.

The northern dialects represent a distinct homogenous linguistic group, one of their distinctive features being a high percentage of Yagara language words. The language varieties spoken on the Gold Coast across to the Logan River could more appropriately be termed the Mibin dialects, according to Jefferies, the difference of Mibiny and Baygal for the word for "Man/people" is due to socio-political developments and not simply dialect splits, with Bannister commenting that the Yugambeh differed from the Bandjalang proper and Gidabal, due to distinct terms for basic concepts such man and woman, while grammatical studies show that the Yugambeh dialects did differ in some degree from other Bandjalang groups both lexically and morphologically.'

=== Dialects ===
The particular number of dialects (and their degree of mutual intelligibility) are differently described depending on the source.

- According to Terry Crowley, the branch has 7 dialects.
  - Margaret Sharpe, drawing on Crowley, additionally includes the Geynyan dialect.
  - Anthony Jefferies, also drawing on Crowley, refers to Yugam(beh), Ngarangwal/Ngarahkwal, Nganduwal, and Minyungbal of Byron, as the 'Mibin Dialects'
- Shaun Davies, reperforming Crowley's original analysis, finds a single language with two mutually intelligible regional varieties and excludes Geynyan and the Byron Bay Minyungbal from the branch.
- Archibald Meston, the Chief Protector of Aborigines, writing in 1923, identifies a single "dialect" spoken in the area from the Nerang to the Logan, which he identified as Yoocum/Yoocumbah.
- The Yugambeh Museum say their language is spoken in the Logan, Gold Coast, Scenic Rim, and Tweed areas.

The Minyungbal of Byron are regarded by Tindale as a distinct group. Davies, noting that Crowley admitted to likely errors in his analysis, reconducted the analysis and found only a single Tweed-Albert Language, which is alternatively referred to as Yugam(beh) (Note: Culham said yugambe: was the negative, and Mrs. Weizel referred to the language as Yugam (Cunningham 1969, p. 96).) (also spelt Yugambir,) Minjangbal/Minyangbal, (Note: According to the Gidabal at Woodenbong, the coastal people are supposed to have called the inland clans Minyangbal (Cunningham 1969, p. 97).) or Nganduwal (as well by the various clan names, such as Manaldjali. ) Ngarangwal – spoken between the Logan River and Point Danger, is said by Davies to only differ by a few words, e.g. the third-person singular female pronoun. Livingstone's Minyung, spoken at Byron Bay and on the Brunswick River and called a "sister dialect" to that spoken to the north, which he alternatively called Nghendu, is considered by Davies to be part of a separate linguistic branch. For Norman Tindale, the term Nganduwal was an alternative name of the Byron Bay Minyungbal tribe, which he regarded as a distinct group.

The Logan area ran along its western edges, while its eastern limits were on the Tamborine Plateau, Canungra and just short of the Coomera River. It was first recorded in substantial form by the Jimboomba schoolteacher John Allen on the basis of a vocabulary supplied to him by the Wangerriburra clansman Bullum in 1913, and later described in more detail by Margaret Sharpe who took down detail notes from her informant Joe Culham, one of the last speakers (d.1968) of this variety of the dialect. Nils Holmer completed his Linguistic survey of south-eastern Queensland in 1983, a chapter of which included vocabulary and an analysis of grammar of the language as spoken by the Manandjali (Mununjali) living in Beaudesert and the surrounding area.

== Country ==
The Yugambeh territory lies between the Logan and Tweed Rivers, while Norman Tindale estimated their territorial reach as extending over roughly 1,200 square miles (3,100 km^{2}), along the Logan River from Rathdowney to its mouth, and running south as far as the vicinity of Southport. Their western frontier lay around Boonah and the slopes of the Great Dividing Range. Tindale places his Kalibal in the upper Nerang and western Tweed valley, and Minyungbal in the Lower Nerang and eastern Tweed valley. There are problems with Tindale's mapping, since he generally located his groups where Margaret Sharpe puts the Yugambeh people. Fison and Howitt writing in the late 19th century describe their country as "to the south of Brisbane, somewhat inland, but also along the coast" to as far as Point Danger, and "about the head of the Albert, Logan and Tweed rivers". The Yuggera are to their west and north, the Quandamooka to their north-east (North Stradbroke and Moreton Island), the Githabul to their south-west, and the Bundjalung to their south. According to Tindale, the Minyungbal held some 600 square miles (1,600 km^{2}) of territory running northwards from Cape Byron as far as Southport. Their inland extension ran to Murwillumbah and Nerang Creek.

== Society ==
Linguistically, the Yugambeh speak language varieties of the wider Yugambeh-Bundjalung language group, their language forming a discrete dialect group. Culturally researchers, like Anthony Jefferies, have noted the Yugambeh have more affinity with their northern Yagara-speaking neighbours. Anthony Jefferies, having noted the Yugambeh, as well as Gidhabal, seem to have more linguistic and cultural affinity with the Durubulic language speakers to their north than with their southern Bundjalung neighbours, observed key differences between them:

- The use of separate section names / social division terms
- Distinct kinship systems in place (although with shared terminology)
- Differences of scarring patterns

=== Social divisions ===
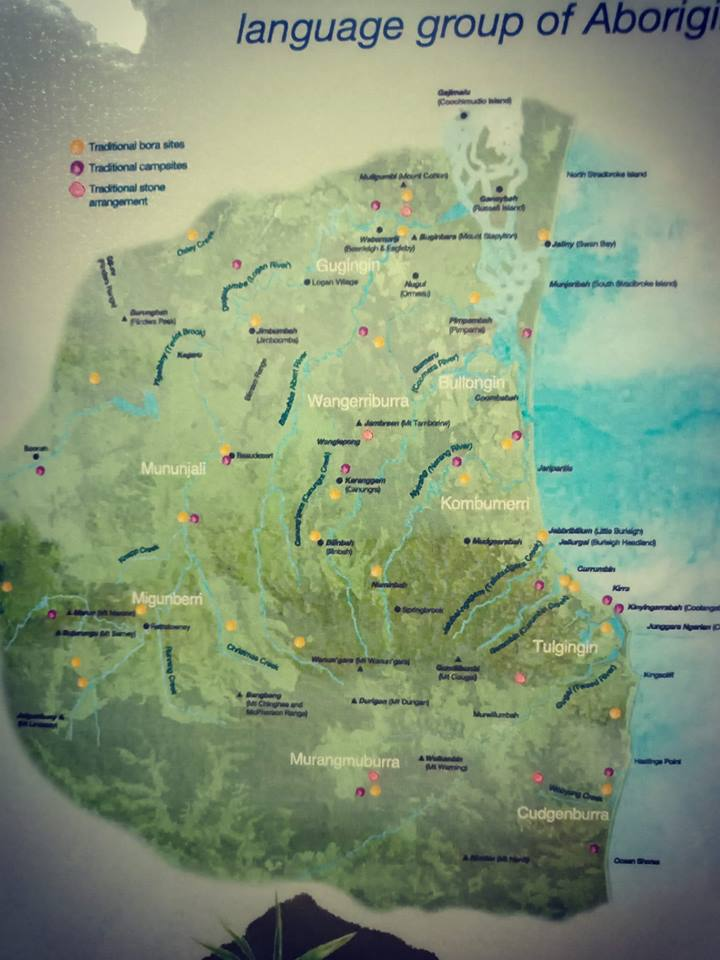
Yugambeh clan map, exhibited at the Yugambeh Museum, as well national park signage at Tamborine, Tallebudgera and Springbrook

R. H. Mathews visited the Yugambeh in 1906 and picked up the following information concerning their social divisions, which were fourfold. Mathews noted specific animals, plants and stars as associated with the divisions. This system of social divisions was shared with the neighboring Gidabal, and Yagara people. To the south, the Bundjalung section names were different, being Wirroong, Marroong, Woomboong, and Kurpoong respectively.

Mother	Father	Son	Daughter
Baranggan	Deroin	Bandjur	Bandjuran
Bandjuran	Banda	Barang	Baranggan
Deroingan	Banda	Barang	Bandagan
Bandagan	Bandjur	Deroin	Deroingan

==== Kinship ====
Among the Yugambeh-Bundjalung languages there were two kinship systems a Wahlubal/Inland system and a Mibiny system, with Anthony Jefferies documenting an Aluridja type system, found in south Bandjalang dialect groups while a Senior Cousin/Junior Cousin kinship system was found amongst the Yugambeh (Mibiny), Yagara, and Ngugi groups. The Yugambeh kinship system is classificatory, i.e. all members of the same social division are classificatory siblings, and not marriageable. Their genealogical terms are extended beyond all blood relatives to include the members of that relatives social division. I.e. a woman of the same division of your mother is her sister, and therefore one's mother as well. The Mibiny kinship system is similar to the Iroquois kinship system, your mother's sisters are called Waijang "mother", and your father's brother's are called Biyang "father", they in turn will call you muyum/muyumgan "son/daughter". A distinction is made between cross-cousins called Yirabung and parallel cousins called Gujarang, parallel cousins are not considered marriageable. In the Yugambeh system, a mother's brother is called Gawang and a father's sister is called Ngaruny, they call their nephews/nieces, burrijang/burrijanggan, and nyugun and nyugunmahn respectively. The Ngaruny-Nyugun/Nyugunmahn relationship is of special importance as it is used to identified suitable marriageable partners, a ngaruny will find one of her sisters and make a match for her nyugun/nyugunmahn. This is distinct from the southern Wahlubal system used by the Bundjalung with Jefferies finding that whilst the Waalubal system has a single term /nyugu:n/ "nephew/niece", without gender distinction, the northern systems which have the same term but differentiated for gender.

=== Clans ===
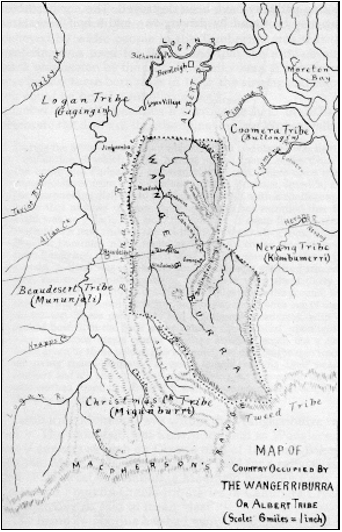
A partial map showing the Wanggeriburra and neighbouring Yugambeh clans – circa 1913

In common with their northerly neighbours, i.e. the Yagara, Quandamooka, Kabi-Kabi, and Wakka-Wakka, the Yugambeh are divided into a number of subgroups. Each nation was divided into a number of locality groups, with each group occupying a designated area of the territory. Each locality had a unique name, derived from a feature of the group's territory, i.e. its geography, geology, flora, or fauna. Family groups did not often travel into the country of other Yugambeh family groups without reason. Clans would frequently visit and stay on each other's estates during times of ceremony, dispute resolution, resource exchange, debt settlement and scarcity of resources, but followed strict protocols governing announcing their presence and their use of other's lands. Each group also has ceremonial responsibilities in their respective countries, like those that ensure that food and medicinal plants grow and that there is a plentiful supply of fish, shellfish, crabs, and other animal food in general. The clan group boundaries tend to follow noticeable geological formations such as river basin systems and mountain ranges. There were a number of permanent camps owned by each clan, which were frequented in a set yearly planned pattern. For everyday living the clan usually broke into smaller family-based groups. They would aggregate at certain times of the year for annual celebrations, which were also a time for inter-clan trade. Co-operation of smaller groups or extended families for large-scale activities occurred when appropriate, such as kangaroo drives. The Yugambeh clans annually gathered on the coast for the mullet feast. The Anthropologist Alfred William Howitt offers a brief traditional history of how the Yugambeh, came to be subdivided into clans, stating that in consequence of internal feuds the nation became broken up into clans. After some time however, the clans became again friendly once more, and had been so ever since. Bullum, a Yugambeh man from the Wanggeriburra clan helped draw a map of his clans territory in 1913, which shows the names and general locations of 7 neighbouring clans. The exact number of clans was not noted in the earlier literature, Howitt, noting at least 7 clans in 1904 stating that not all could be remembered by his informants Recent sources mention a total of 9, or 8 clans across the Yugambeh area.

Yugambeh clans
Name	Location	Alternative names
Gugingin; Northerners (gugin =north).	The lower Logan River, lower Albert River.	Logan tribe, Guwangin, Warrilcum (waril=big river)
Wanggeriburra; Whiptail wallaby people. (Note: From wan'gari, the pretty-faced whip-tailed wallaby (Macdonald 2009, pp. 29–30).)	Middle Albert River basin and Coomera River headwaters. (Note: The Wangerriburra tribe occupied the country in the basin of the middle Albert River and the headwaters of the Coomera River. Their territory stretched from Cedar Creek on the north to the Macpherson Range on the south; and from the Birnam Range on the west to the Upper Coomera and the Nerang Watershed on the east. It contained the well-known Tamborine Mountain. Its greatest length from north to south was 33 miles, its greatest breadth, 15 miles (Cunningham 1969, p. 97))	Tamborine tribe
Bullongin; River people	Coomera River basin.	Balunjali
Tulgigin; Dry-Forest People	The Northern Lower-Tweed River basin.	Chabooburri
Kombumerri; Mudgrove-worm People. (Note: According to Germaine Greer, Archibald Meston called people in this area Talgiburri, equivalent to what Margaret Sharpe transcribes as the Dalgaybara, a word meaning "people of the dalgay or dry sclerophyll forest" rather than saltwater people. Greer argues that there is an apparent confusion, asserting that "The Kombumerri called themselves people of the dry forest; Bullum called them mangrove-worm (cobra) eaters, and now they describe themselves as 'saltwater people'." (Greer 2014, pp. 118–119))	The Nerang River basin.	Talgaiburra
Mununjali; Hard/baked black ground People. (Note: "the soil at Beau desert is a rich black when freshly ploughed." (Cunningham 1969, p. 97))	Beaudesert.	Manaldjali
Murangbara; Water-Vine People	The Upper-Tweed River basin. Bray puts them on the north side of the northern arm of the Tweed.	Moorung-Mooburra (Note: Joshua Bray wrote:"Moorung-moobar", whom, according to Tindale, were a group living north of the "Murwillambara", both of whom he considered Kalibal (Tindale 1974, pp. –78–79).)
Kudjangbara; Red-Ochre People	The Southern Lower-Tweed River Basin. The area ten miles in from coast between the Tweed and Brunswick Rivers.	Cudgenburra, Coodjinburra, Goodjinburra
Migunberri; Mountain Spike People	Christmas Creek.	Balgaburri, Migani, Miganbari, Migunburri, Migunni

=== Confederacy ===
According to Anthony Jefferies, the Mibiny (Yugambeh/Ngarangwal/Nganduwal) are part of a larger extra-linguistic group he referred to as a "confederacy" or "messmate"; he called the Chepara (Djipara) this confederacy which combined the Yagara-speaking groups north of the Logan River with the Mibiny dialect groups south of the river. Jefferies, quoting Sutton, defines these large groups as sets of hundreds to few thousands people who intermarried each other regularly, shared many if not all of each other's languages, and whose countries tended to cover adjacent parts of a river drainage system,. It is within these larger groupings where one would find commonality of marriage rules, collaboration in ceremonies, military allies, and many surface similarities among languages. Besides sharing their section system, both groups share ritual scarring patterns, with a dividing line running through the Yugambeh-Bundjalung language speakers with those to the north of the line have patterns that match groups further north (Yagara-speaking groups), while those to the south have patterns which align with groups further south (Gumbaynggiric-speaking groups). The Mibiny and Yagara also share their kinship system (with each group employing their own language).

== History ==
=== Pre-European arrival (pre-1824) ===
Archaeological evidence indicates that Aboriginal people have lived in the Gold Coast region for tens of thousands of years. When early European settlers first arrived in the region they found a complex network of Aboriginal family groups speaking a number of dialects of the Yugambeh language. There were nine clan groups:the Gugingin, Bullongin, Kombumerri, Tul-gi-gin, Moorang-Mooburra, Cudgenburra, Wanggerriburra, Mununjali and Migunberri. These clan groups were exogamous, and men found wives from a clan other than their own. Yugambeh people camped on the banks of rivers and along the coast where plentiful resources provided a stable living. It was noted by early visitors that the local people used a variety of technology in their daily lives, including canoes. Each Yugambeh clan had their own allocated area of country, and domain over that area, it was typically where they hunted and lived. Visitations between clans was frequent for a variety of reasons. Each group also had ceremonial responsibilities in their respective countries, connected to the upkeep of resources, and the maintenance and visitation of djurebil – sacred personal or increase sites. Waterholes were an important economic resource, and would later be the subject of much conflict between Yugambeh people and the European arrivals. Each family group had a number of permanent camps established and moved from camp to camp in response to seasonal changes, their movements were not unplanned wandering but was a planned and logical response to environmental conditions. The Gugingin of the Logan area were noted as expert net makers, using fine cone-shaped nets to trap fish and larger nets 15 metres (49 ft) wide to trap kangaroos. When moving between camps, groups would leave their excess equipment and other belongings behind in a small shelter made like a tripod covered with bark; it was a point of honour that belongings left in this way were never stolen. The coastal clans of the area were hunters, gatherers and fishers. The Quandamooka of Stradbroke Island had dolphins aid them in the hunting and fishing processes. On sighting a shoal of mullet, they would hit the water with their spears to alert their dolphins, to whom they gave individual names, and the dolphins would then chase the shoal towards the shore, trapping them in the shallows and allowing the men to net and spear the fish. Some traditions state that this practice was shared by the Yugambeh Kombumerri clan. The dolphin is known to have played an important role in a legend of the Nerang River Yugambeh, according to which the culture hero Gowonda was transformed into one on his death.

=== Early European exploration and colonisation (1824–1860) ===
A penal colony was established by European settlers in 1824, just north of the Yugambeh clans, which was encircled by a 50-mile exclusion zone. (Note: Evidence given by Allan Cunningham, 13 February 1832, "Report from Select Committee on Secondary Punishments 1821–32".. cited by J. G. Steele, Brisbane Town in Convict Davs 1824–1843, (St Lucia, Queensland University Press, 1974), p. 164; R. I. Longhurst, 'Settlement and Development of Queensland's Gold Coast to 1889 '.. Settlement of the Colony oi QiLeensisnd- (Brisbane, Library Board of Queensland, 1978), pp. 4–5.)

The Brisbane area was open to free settlement in 1842. Reverend Henry Stobart wrote of the Yugambeh in 1853, remarking on the abundance of resources in the area, and noted in particular thriving stands of walking stick palms, endemic to the Numinbah Valley and in Yugambeh called midyim, a resource already being harvested for sale in England. By this time the Yugambeh were already cautious of government officials, with women and children hiding from strangers until it was determined they were not government representatives. Henry Stobart commented:

The Aborigines in this part rarely see white men, except very bad specimens of them – sawyers chiefly, engaged in cutting timber – from whom they have learnt little else of our language excepting oaths, and by whom, they are, I fear, in too many cases treated very inhumanely

The Yugambeh suffered from violent attacks undertaken by the Australian native police under their colonial leaders. According to the informant John Allen, over 60 years old at the time, and referring to his earliest memories sometime in the 1850s, a group of his tribe were surprised by troopers at Mount Wetheren and fired upon.

The blacks—men, women, and children—were in a dell at the base of a cliff. Suddenly a body of troopers appeared on the top of the cliff and without warning opened fire on the defenceless party below. Bullumm remembers the horror of the time, of being seized by a gin and carried to cover, of cowering under the cliff and hearing the shots ringing overhead, of the rush through the scrub to get away from the sound of the death-dealing guns. In this affair only two were killed, an old man and a gin. Those sheltered under the cliff could hear the talk of the black troopers, who really did not want to kill, but who tried to impress upon the white officer in charge the big number they had slaughtered.

In 1855 an incident caused by a local tribesman sparked off a running spree of killings as troopers sought to kill the culprit. Allen recounted the story thus:

'About 1855. A German woman and her boy were killed at Sandy Creek, Jimboomba, near where is now the McLean Bridge, by a blackfellow known as "Nelson." The murderer was coming back from Brisbane on horseback and met the woman and boy on the road walking to Brisbane. The man was caught soon after committing the crime, but escaped from custody. He was a Coomera black, but sometimes lived with the Albert and Nerang tribes. The black troopers knew this, and were constantly on his tracks but never caught him. They had no scruples in shooting any blacks in the hope that the victim might be the escaped murderer. From 30 to 40 blacks were killed by troopers in this way, but "Nelson" died a natural death in spite of it all, some years after in Beenleigh.'

In 1857, he recalled, again under the direction of Frederick Wheeler, a further massacre took place on the banks of the Nerang River (which may have followed theft on William Duckett White's Murry Jerry run there):

A party of " Alberts," among whom was old blind Nyajum, was there camped on a visit to their friends and neighbours of the Nerang and Tweed. There had been a charge of cattle-killing brought against the local tribes, and someone had to pay. The police heard of this camp, and, under command of Officer Wheeler, cut it off on the land side with a body of troopers. The alarm was given. The male aboriginals plunged into the creek, swam to the other side, and hid in the scrub. The black troopers again were bad marksmen—probably with intent—as the only casualties were one man shot in the leg and one boy drowned. The old blind man had been hidden under a pile of skins in a hut, but was found by the troopers and dragged out by the heels. The gins told the troopers he was blind from birth. The troopers begged the officer not to order the poor fellow to be killed. The gins crowded round Wheeler imploring mercy for the wretched victim; some hung on to the troopers to prevent them firing. But prayers were useless; Wheeler was adamant. The gins were dragged off or knocked off with carbines, and the blind man was then shot by order of the white officer.'

In another incident, which took place in 1860, six Yugambeh youths were kidnapped from camps in the area of the Nerang River area and forcibly transported to Rockhampton where they were to be inducted into, and trained to carry out punitive missions, by Frederick Wheeler, an officer with a notorious record for brutality. On witnessing the murder of one of the trainees, the small group planned their escape and, one night, snuck away to embark on an epic walk of some 550 kilometres back home. Fearing betrayal, they shied clear even of other Aboriginal groups of their route which followed the coast on their left. After three months trekking, one youth climbed a tree and cried out Wollumbin! Wollumbin! (Mount Warning), much in the manner of the Greeks in Xenophon's Anabasis. They had made it back home. One of the youths, Keendahn, who was ten years old at the time, was so traumatised by the experience that he would hide in the bush for decades later, whenever word of police in the vicinity reached their camps.

William E. Hanlon's family of English immigrants settled there around 1863. He states that the Yugambeh were friendly from the outstart:

There were many blacks in the district, but on no occasion did they give us any trouble. On the contrary, we were always glad to see them, for they brought us fish, kangaroo tails, crabs, or honey, to barter for our flour, sugar, tea, or "tumbacca."

Hanlon wrote of the areas rich resources. In a single morning he and 4 friends shot down 200 bronzewing pigeons and large stands of much sought after red cedar, pine and beech were harvested by incoming woodcutters, while stands of the now highly prized tulip wood were burnt off as "useless". Returning to the area in the early 1930s after a half century absence, he wrote:

I found the rivers denuded of all their old and glorious scrubs, and their whilom denizens were neither to be seen nor heard. The streams themselves seemed to be sullen and sluggish, and polluted, and wore an air of being ashamed of their now-a-days nudity. Utility and ugliness were the dominant notes everywhere. In many places the physical features of the places were changed or entirely obliterated; watercourse and chain of ponds of my day were, nearly all, filled in with the accumulated debris of the past half century or so.

=== Mission era (1860–1960) ===
Non-indigenous arrival brought a negative impact on the local people, like alcohol and disease; conflict and displacement of Yugambeh groups from traditional food sources as settlers acquired land for agricultural purposes. The struggles of the original inhabitants was recognised by government authorities, but too often efforts failed to achieve much. Pastor Johann Gottfried Haussmann founded the first mission in the newly separate colony of Queensland in 1866 at Beenleigh, this mission Bethesda was said by Haussmann to be a "heathen mission" to the local Aboriginals in the wider Albert-Logan area:

My main tasks shall be, provided the Lord permit me to live, to do Mission work amongst the poor heathen. This was the reason I actually came to Australia.

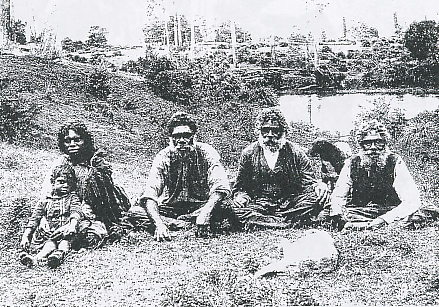
L–R: Polly holding Molly Boyd, Jimmy Boyd, Kipper Tommy and Coomera Bob on the Nerang River circa 1910

In 1866, a large corroboree of 200 was held nearby which Haussmann attended, meeting a few men whom he had instructed at Zion Hill Mission. Since November, the Yugambeh of the Logan and Albert rivers had started gathering at Bethesda (Wherever missions were established in Australia, Aboriginal people understood very quickly that Christmas was an excellent time to visit – there would be festivities, ceremonies and an all-pervading spirit of gift giving.) Pastor Haussmann is said to have used this increase of visitors as an opportunity to negotiate a contract with the "chief" to pay him five shillings weekly, presumably work was expected in return, but he used the time also to "speak to them about the well being of their souls", gathering them every day under a tree in order to recite hymns and prayer and reading from the New Testaments, which Haussmann would then explain to them. Haussmann's reports record a number of identities at Bethesda, from October to December 1867 a man named Jack was taught by Haussmann regularly, and had learnt to read and write, a King Rohma (a chief of the tribe), and a Kingkame (or Kingkema, or Kingcame) who brought his family to attend devotions each day, he also acted as a mediator to Haussmann's industrial mission at Nerang. In 1869, the German Lutheran Church, again led by Haussmann, secured land for a mission on the western bank of the Nerang River at Advancetown, here they established the "Nerang Creek Aboriginal Industrial Mission". Similar to what Haussmann had begun at Bethesda, the mission's purpose was to Christianise and provide support to the Yugambeh people. Starting at initial 1,000 acres (400 ha), the Nerang mission grew to a reserve of 5,000 acres (2,000 ha), it was not successful however, with only some minor works occurring before the reserve was cancelled in 1879. Due to an inability to make their mortgage repayments on their sugar business, Haussmann's Bethesda Mission saw its demise. The discouraging progress of indigenous conversion at Bethesda hindered the Mission-work and there was a lack of financial support from the government and the wider Christian network. Falling sugar prices, rust infestations at Bethesda, the incompetency of the mission's machinery and increased competition from neighbours all combined to push the Haussmann's operation into an irreparable financial situation and Bethesda Mission closed in 1881.

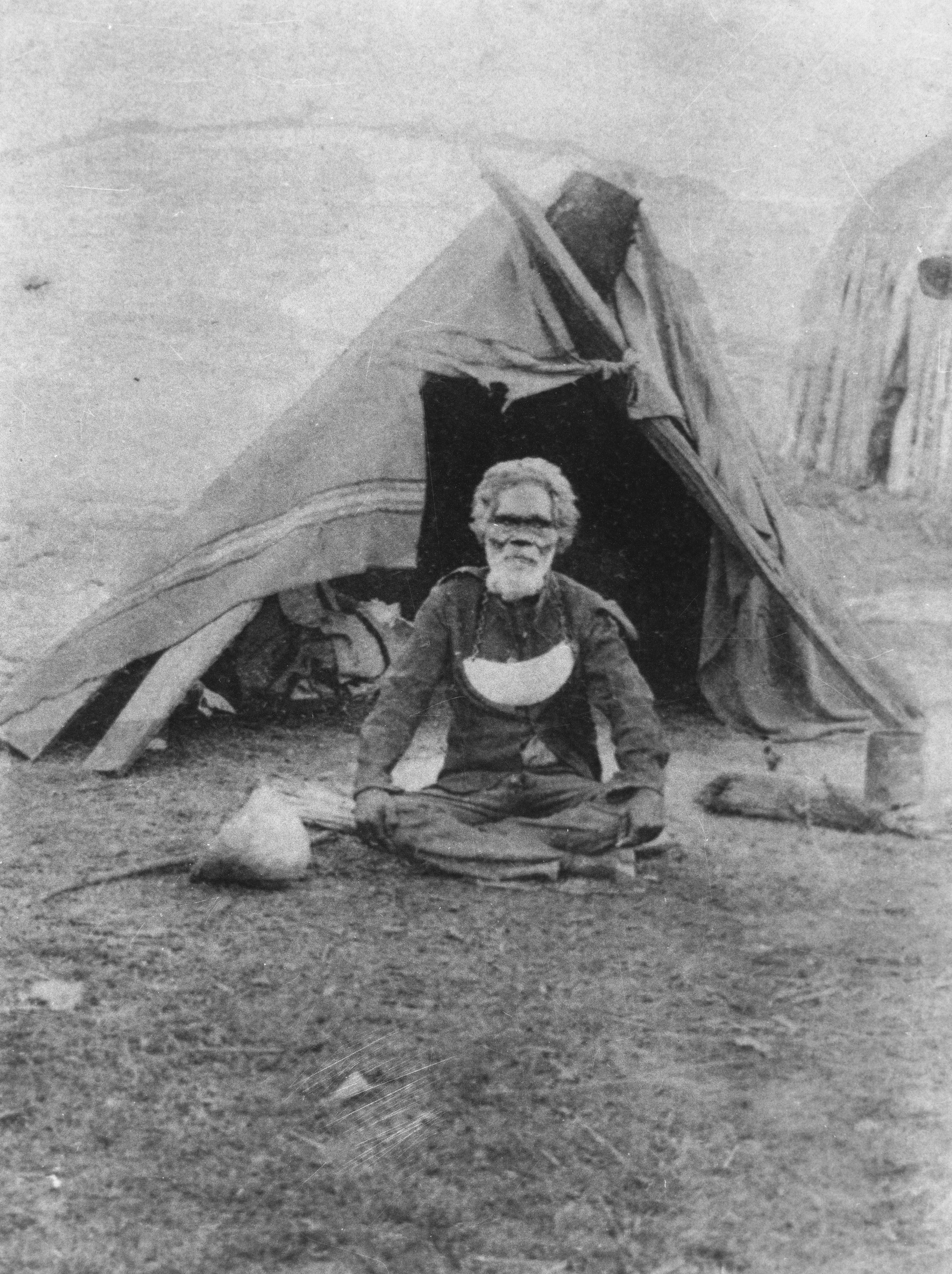
Bilin Bilin, sitting outside a tent at the Deebing Creek Aboriginal Mission, ca. 1900

Deebing Creek Aboriginal Mission and Industrial School was established in 1887, it operated at South Deebing Road until 1915 when it was moved to Carmichael Road, and became known as Purga. Deebing creek saw the mixing of numerous tribes, the Chief Protector of the Aborigines – Archibald Meston, removed Aboriginal people from the Brisbane, Fassifern and Logan areas to Deebing Creek, a place where, he hoped that Aboriginals from different tribes would be able to live amicably with one another. As settlers encroached Yugambeh lands were alienated from their traditional users and by the turn of the century they were being forced to go to these reserves. Many Yugambeh remained in their traditional country and found employment with farmers, oyster producers and fishermen, timber cutters and mills constructed for the production of resources like sugar and arrowroot. Yugambeh people protested their removal from the lands of their fathers and mothers, with protests occurring from groups at Boonah, Beaudesert, Beenleigh and Southport. These arguments were not accepted by European authorities and groups were sent to centralised reserves 'for their own beneft'. The Aborigines Protection Act of 1897 saw the removal of many of the remaining Yugambeh people from their land to Aboriginal missions and reserves throughout Queensland, but Yugambeh people did resis pressure to move, like Bilin Bilin who was able to stay on his country until old age forced him to relocate to the mission at Deebing Creek. Deebing creek had a school and a number of huts and continued to operate until 1948. With many uncertainties and difficulties, some Yugambeh people found refuge in the mountains of the hinterland, while others were employed on farms, in the timber industry or as domestic servants. On the coast, others were able to be involved in the fishing, oyster and tourism industries. At the advent of both world wars, Yugambeh people attempted to enlist but, like other Aboriginal Australians, had their efforts to join the armed forces resisted due to official policy that saw them as unsuitable because of their "racial origin". In a few cases however they were successful, with 10 Yugambeh people serving in World War I, then subsequently 47 in World War II, they have fought in every major conflict from World War I to the 1991 Gulf War. After service, their contributions were rarely recognised by historians or brought to the attention of the public, and they were not paid the same as other returned soldiers. A number of Yugambeh people sought refuge on Ukerabagh Island in the mouth of the Tweed River, which provided any isolated environment to maintain their culture, and by the early 1920s a small community had grown. Australia's first indigenous member of the Australian parliament Neville Bonner was born on Ukerabagh in 1922. In 1927, the NSW Aborigines Protection Board declared the island an Aboriginal Reserve, which allowed to be serviced with government rations. Not all Aboriginal people moved to Ukerabagh by choice, some were sent there by local police to keep them away from white settlements. The island was also home to Torres Strait Islanders who had come to work on the Tweed. Its status as an Aboriginal Reserve was revoked in 1951, but families continued to live there.

=== Recent history (since 1960) ===
Through 1968 to 1983, Yugambeh people were studied by linguists, those interviewed were living in the Beaudesert and surrounding areas, Woodenbong, and the Tweed. Anthropologists mapping Aboriginal groups in Queensland also found a number of Yugambeh living at Cherbourg Mission in the 70s. In 1974, members of the Mununjali clan started the Beaudesert Aborigines and Islander Cooperative society. In the late 70s families who resided on Ukerabagh Island protested against proposed development, and in 1980 the area was gazetted as the Ukerebagh Island Nature Reserve. In the early 1980s a number of Yugambeh, sitting around a dining room table, discussed an idea that lead them to found the Kombumerri Aboriginal Corporation for Culture which grew into one of Australia's most successful Aboriginal-owned language organisations, and is a major contributor to the indigenous cultural landscape of south east Queensland. The Yugambeh, represented by the Kombumerri Aboriginal Corporation for Culture with the support and assistance from the Gold Coast City Council, erected a War Memorial on the site of the Jebribillum Bora Park Burleigh Heads at Burleigh Heads in 1991, now known as Jebribillum Bora Park. The memorial consists of a stone taken from nearby Mt Tamborine, a sacred site to the Yugambeh clans. Sources provide three transcriptions for the inscription, which means "Many Eagles (Yugambeh warriors) Protecting Our Country":

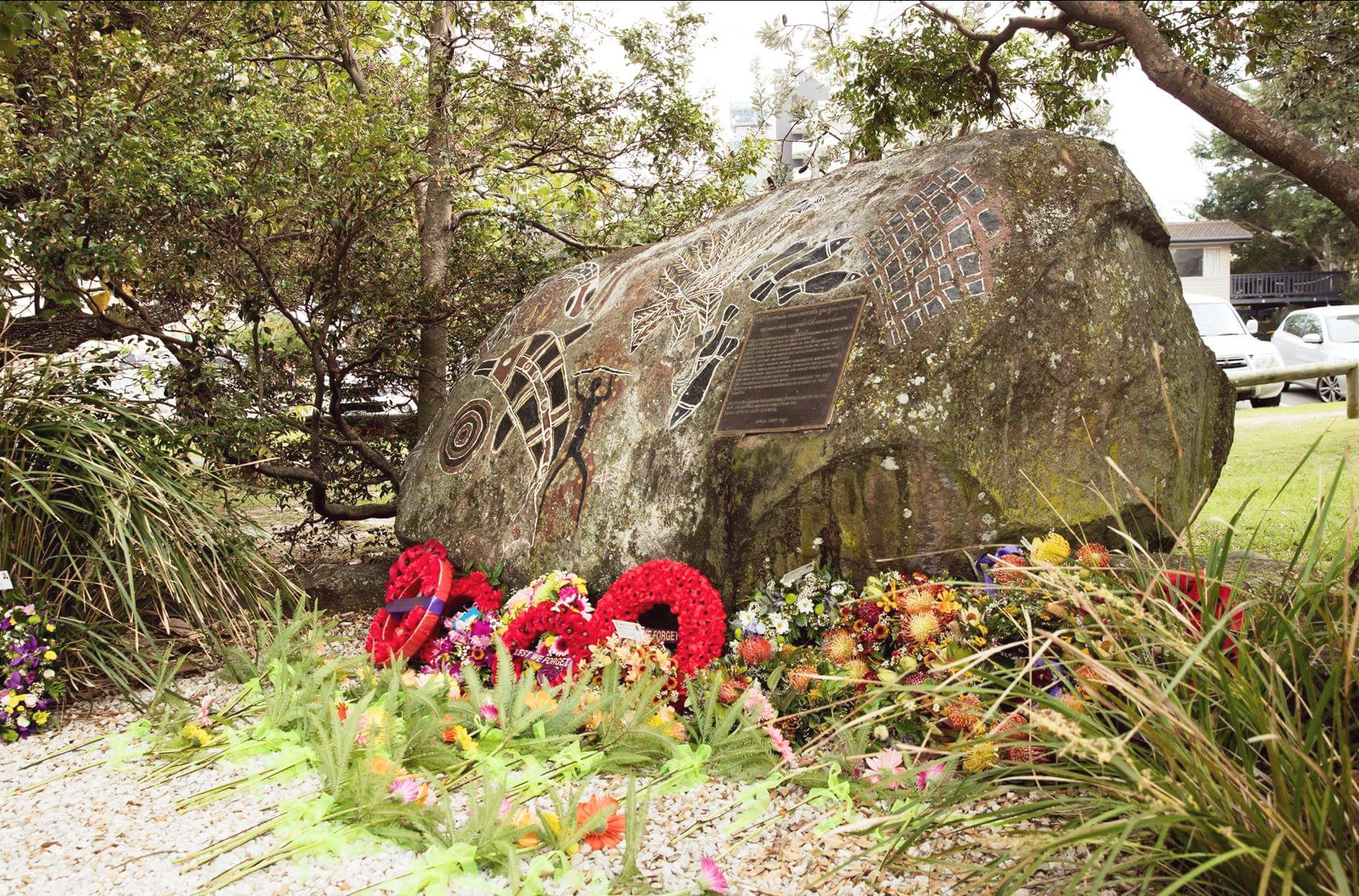
Yugambeh War Memorial, Burleigh Heads

- Mibun Wallal Mundindehla Ŋaliŋah/Njalinjah Dhagun
- mibun wallul mundindehla nalinah dhagun
- Mibunn Wallull Munjindeila Ngullina Jagun

The corporation established the Yugambeh Museum, Language and Heritage Research Centre at the corner of Martens Street and Plantation Road in Beenleigh. It was opened in 1995 by Senator Neville Bonner, Australia's first Aboriginal Federal Parliamentarian. The museum is the main resource for objects and information relating to the ongoing story of the Yugambeh people, their spiritual and cultural history, and their language. The museum organises education programs, exhibitions and events, including traditional ceremonies. The Museum houses over 20 distinct exhibits composed of over 300 panels. The Yugambeh Museum also maintains records and research on Yugambeh descendants who served in the armed forces. The Gold Coast Aboriginal and Islander Housing Co-operative was founded in 1981, the result of a successful local movement of Aboriginal people on the Gold Coast lobbying for affordable housing to help those in need, this society went on to come Kalwun Development Corporation in 1994. With authorisation from the Yugambeh people, Kalwun operates the Jellurgal Aboriginal Cultural Centre which offers bus and walking tours of the Gold Coast, and is fully owned and operated by the local Aboriginal community. The same year of Kalwun's founding, the Beaudesert Aborigines and Islander society started Mununjali housing, the society continued to exist, however is solely run by Mununjali under a Memorandum of Understanding. Mununjali Housing and Development Company Ltd is the umbrella for:

- Jymbi (Family) Centre – A family support service that offers counselling, court support, referrals, client support services and day/overnight programs.
- Jymbilung House Home and Community Care – A housing provider and aged care facility.
- The Mununjali Pace Program – The Parental and Community Engagement program (PaCE) is a service provided to parents to support their children's education and involvement in school.

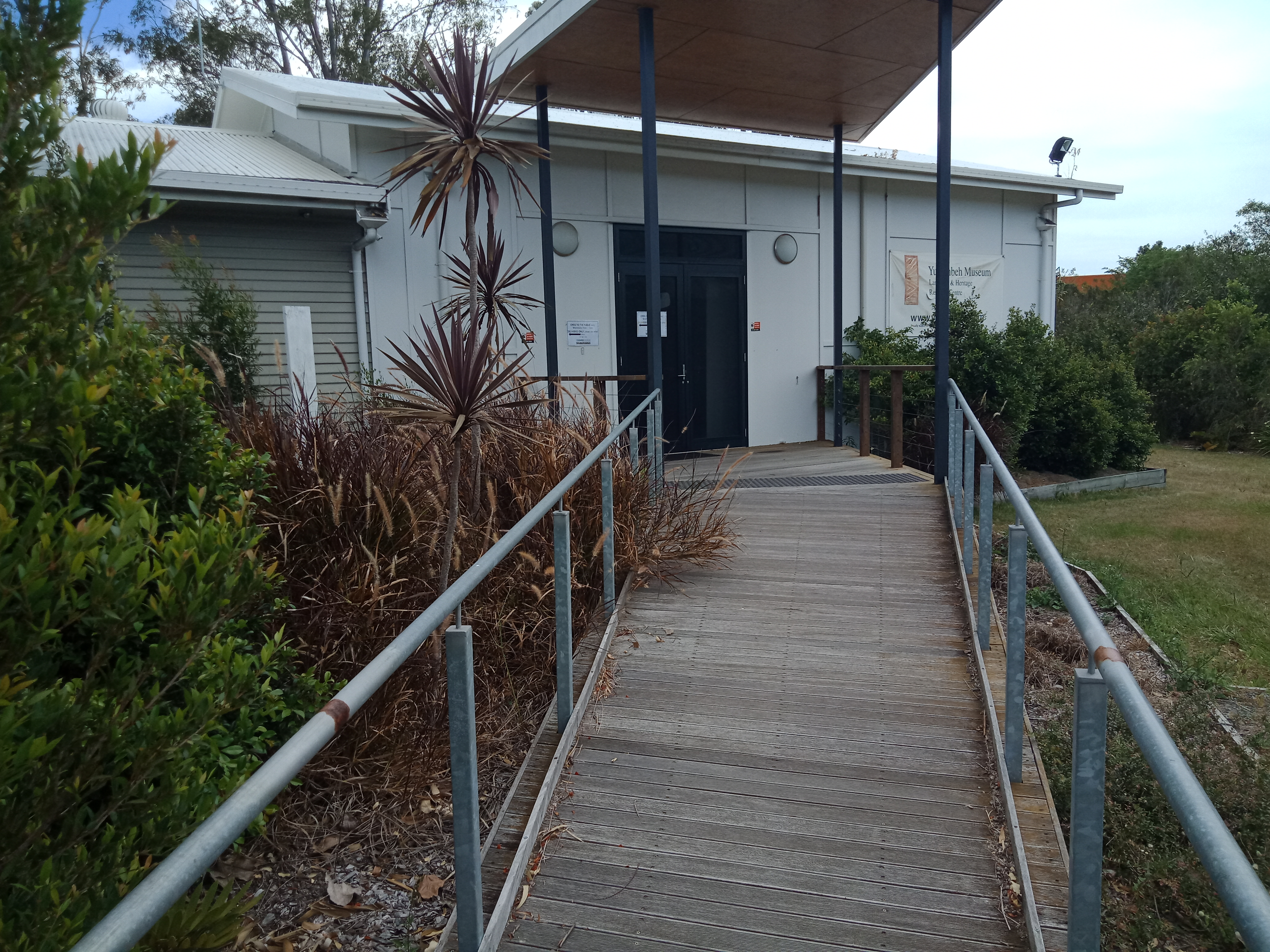
Yugambeh Museum

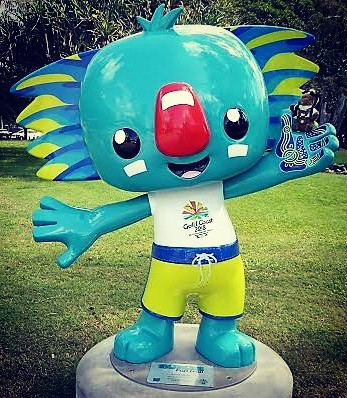
Borobi

In 1998 the Ngarangwal, operating Ngarang-Wal Land Council made a successful application to the Indigenous Land Corporation which purchased a 100 acres (40 ha) of land at the bottom of Tamborine their behalf, this land was declared the Guanaba Indigenous Protected Area in November 2000. The Guanaba Indigenous Protected Area, part of Kombumerri traditional land, is located at the base of Mount Tamborine, west of the suburb of Guanaba and covers 100 hectares of dense rainforest, vine thickets, eucalypt woodlands, picturesque creeks and indigenous wildlife species. Early colonial timber harvesting and cattle grazing devastated much of the wild- and plant life of the general area, which the Yugambeh relied on for their sustenance, but plants and animals, such as the Brush-tailed rock-wallaby, the three-toed snake-tooth skink and the spotted-tail quoll in Guanaba escaped much of this early damage given the steepness of the escarpment, which made accessing its timber reserves very difficult. Feral dogs and cane toads are a major threat to the area, which remains a key habitat for the endangered Fleay's frog, and is said to be one of the last places where breeding colonies of the endangered long-nosed potoroo still exist. The Yugambeh train young people of their community in traditional ways at Guanaba, and work with conservation experts to ensure the conservation of the area's landscape integrity. Members of the Tweed Aboriginal community run the Minjungbal Aboriginal Cultural Centre, which is a popular meeting place for Goori people and other Aboriginal peoples. Built next to a Bora Ring, which can be seen from the walking tracks. The museum exhibits informative videos, Aboriginal art, and traditional dance and song on the outdoor performance area. Aboriginal tour guides offer tours through the museum and site, telling you about its relics, plants and animals, explaining how Aboriginal life was in the area before colonisation. From early 2015, three years before the 2018 Commonwealth Games, the Yugambeh people were involved with the Gold Coast 2018 Commonwealth Games Corporation's (GOLDOC) community consultation establishing a Yugambeh Elders Advisory Group (YEAG) consisting of nine local aunts and uncles. A Reconciliation Action Plan (RAP) was developed for the Commonwealth Games 2018, and endorsed by YEAG, this was the first International Sporting Event and Commonwealth Games to have a RAP. The Games Mascot was named Borobi, a word from the local Yugambeh language, meaning Koala; it was the first Australian sporting mascot to have an indigenous name, which was described as "a huge credit to our Elders and their work to revive language in everyday use", and "a powerful message to the rest of the world". Yugambeh elders Patricia O'Connor and Ted Williams, travelled to London to launch the Queen's

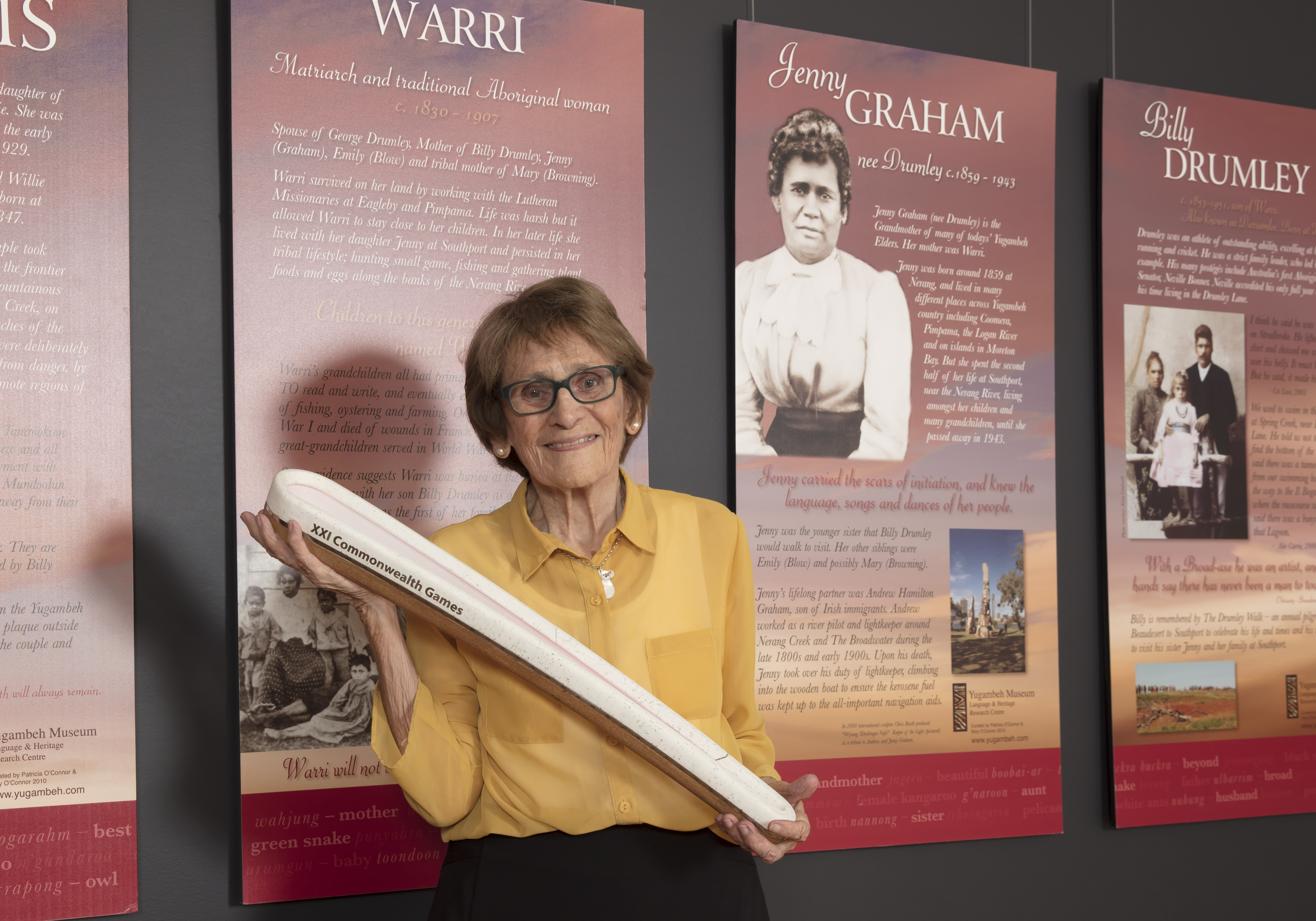
Patricia O'Connor with the Queen's Baton at the Yugambeh Museum

Baton Relay- marking the first time traditional owners had attended the ceremony. After a 288-day journey, the Queen's Baton was passed from New Zealand to Australia in the Māori Court of the Auckland Museum, wherein a traditional farewell ceremony to farewell and handover the baton the Ngāti Whātua elders of Auckland passed the Queen's Baton to representatives of the Yugambeh people. Yugambeh performers were present to respond to the Maori farewell ceremony. Yugambeh culture was incorporated into the Queens Baton with the use of native macadamia wood, known in Yugambeh language as gumburra. A story given by Patricia O'Connor served as the inspiration for the Baton, as Macadamia nuts were often planted by groups travelling through country, to mark the way and provide sustenance to future generations – upon hearing the story, the baton's designers decided to use macadamia wood as a symbol of traditional sustainable practice.

When I was a little girl, probably seven or eight years old, I was cracking Queensland nuts. My grandmother said "when I was a little girl I planted those nuts as I walked with my father along the Nerang river" and she said "you call them Queensland nuts, I call them Goomburra". She planted them when she walked with her dad, and as an adult she saw them bearing fruit.

== Economy ==
The native economy can be described as well-planned, with a deliberate effort to make maximum use of resources. This was achieved by a regular annual cycle in step with seasonal changes, and boosted with well-thought-out inter-clan trade. Tools and implements were produced from local material where possible.

=== Cuisine ===
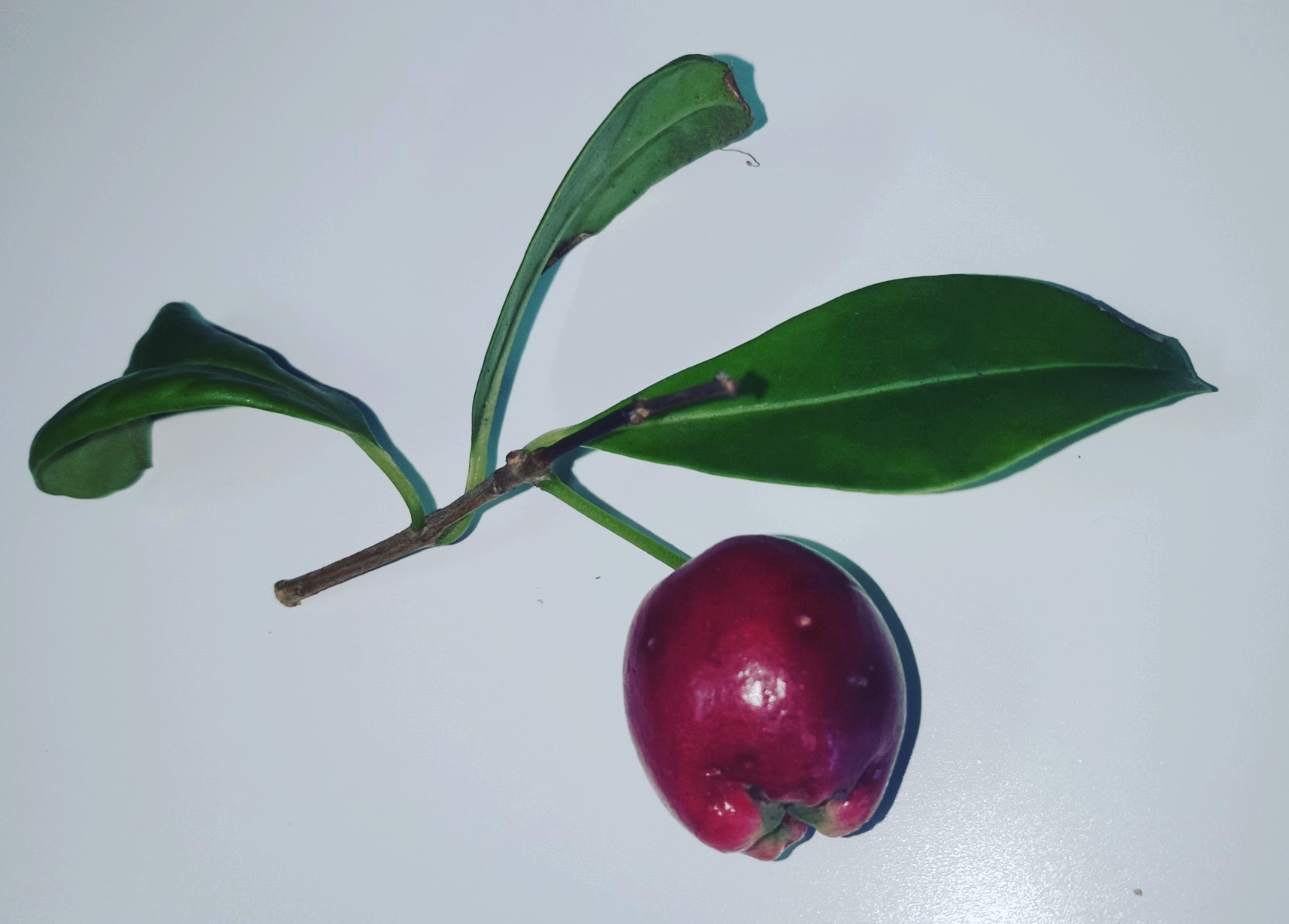
Lilli pilli (Syzygium australe)

The traditional Yugambeh diet consisted of flora and fauna native to their region, almost anything that could be eaten was, though certain species were avoided for totemic reasons. The native fern-root (Telmatoblechnum indicum) was a staple and major source of starch, and its preparation required careful pounding so as not to break the internal rhizomes, which could pierce the throat. Other plant roots were also eaten, like bulrush, native rosella (Hibiscus heterophyllus), club rush (Schoenoplectus litoralis), cotton tree (Hibiscus tiliaceus). Pink swamp lily (Murdannia graminea) and fringed lily (Thysanotus tuberosus) tubers were taken to eat as well. The native fruits of the blue quandong (Elaeocarpus grandis), crab apple (Schizomeria ovata), blueberry lily (Dianella caerulea), native cherry (Exocarpos cupressiformis), tuckeroo (Cupaniopsis anacardioides), lilli pilli (Acmena smithii), scrub cherry (Syzygium australe), native tamarind (Diploglottis australis), wombat berry (Eustrephus latifolius) and various Ficus species were consumed, in addition to the berries of the barbwire vine (Smilax australis), passionfruit (Passiflora aurantia), raspberry (Rubus hillii), roseleaf bramble (Rubus rosifolius) and pink-flowered raspberry (Rubus parvfolius). The seeds of certain wattles species were ground into flour and mixed with water into a paste, and banksia flowers were swirled in water to make a honey flavoured drink. The leaves of the David's heart (Macaranga tanarius) were used as serving plates for food. Conical fishing nets were used for catching fish, and larger nets, some 15m wide, were used for catching kangaroos. The most basic way of cooking involved ground heated by a fire which was extinguished and cleared. Food would be placed on the heated earth until cooked, this was a common way of cooking shellfish like oysters or mud whelks. A fire was kept burning while larger portions of food like meat were cooked. Alternatively, the food was sealed inside an earth oven in a pit while it cooked. This is a suitable way to cook birds, especially emus (Dromaius novaehollandiae). Groups would gather on the coast to fish during the annual autumn/winter run of sea mullet (Mugil cephalus). Similarly, the Yugambeh clans would travel to the biennial bunya nut (Araucaria bidwillii) feasts held at the Bunya Mountains. Other species consumed were freshwater mullet, the long-necked turtle (Chelodina longicollis) and the short-necked turtle (Emydura), and eel. The eggs of the brush turkey (Alectura lathamii) were highly sought. Most waterbird species were eaten; ducks were hunted using boomerangs to frighten them into carefully positioned nets. The teredo worm (Teredo navalis) was attained by the deliberate felling of swamp oaks (Casuarina glauca) into estuaries that attracted the worm.

=== Medicine ===
Dozens of species of plants were used for medicinal purposes, and local people continue to use them to this day. Animals byproducts were also used like the fat from the lace monitor (Varanus varius), which was rubbed into the body, while inorganic substances like clay was used a vermifuge. The inner bark of Acacia melanoxylon was used for skin disorders, as was the bark of Acacia falcata, while the bark from Moreton Bay ash (Corymbia tesselaris) was infused to treat dysentery. Gum procured from the bloodwood (Corymbia gummifera) was used to treat ringworm, while spotted gum (Corymbia citriodora) resin was used for toothaches. Insect bites were treated with the sap of bungwall (Blechnum indicum) or bracken (Pteridium esculentum); prepared bungwall may have been an antihelminthic. Milky mangrove (Excoecaria agallocha) sap was used to treat heat ulcers. A poultice was made from the a rhizome paste of the cunjevoi (Alocasia macrorrhizos), which was used for burns, and a lather was made from rubbing the leaves of the soap tree (Alphitonia excelsa), which was used to disinfect skin. The leaves of multiple plants were used in a variety of medicinal ways: an infusion of water chestnut (Eleocharis dulcis) leaves was used a healing agent, an infusion of native raspberry leaves was a stomach ache treatment, and chewing the leaves of the grey mangrove (Avicennia marina) relieved the pain of marine stingers. Some plants were also burned for medicinal purposes like lemon scented barbwire grass (Cymbopogon refractus), whose smoke provided an anaesthetic effect. Goats-foot (Ipomea pes-caprae) leaves were burnt to relieve headaches and charred bracket fungi (Phellinus) was used in healing.

=== Technology ===
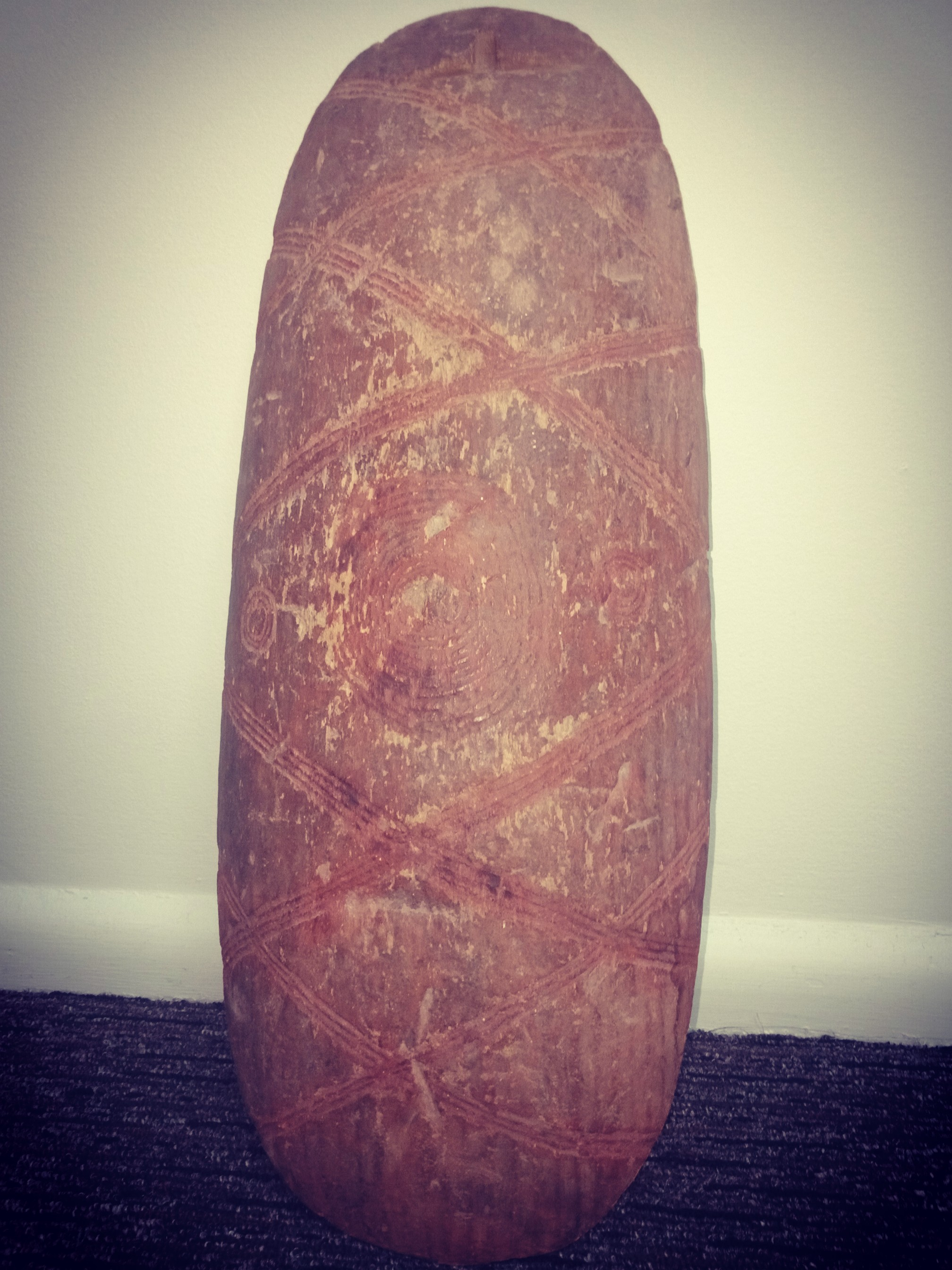
Yugambeh shield from the Tamborine area, circa 1920s

Plant material, animal parts and various inorganic compounds were the raw materials of much Yugambeh technology. The inner bark of many tree trunks was used for rope production, and fine strings were made from grasses. The cotton tree (Hibiscus tiliaceus) was used to produce rope for all kinds of purposes, while the inner bark of the kurrajong (Brachychiton populneus) was used for fishing line. Kangaroo sinew was used to fasten implements or sowing possum skins and echidna spines were used to pierce the skins. These manufactured ropes were used for net production – nets with large meshes were made from strong ropes and used for dugong and wallaby hunts, while finer rope was used in fish nets. Mat rush (Lomandra longifolia and Lomandra hystrix) was used to weave dillybags. These bags were used for a variety of purposes and were made in a number of sizes, some being quite large. The sap of the hoop pine (Araucaria cunninghami) was used as a cement, and Xanthorrhoea species were valued as well a source of glue. Shelters were made from a light frame covered in sheets of bark tied down with rope; native ginger leaves (Alpinia caerulea) were used in hut making and paperbark bark (Melaleuca quinquenervia) was used to thatch the roofs. Weapons like spears were made from various Acacia species and hardened in fire, while boomerangs and nullahs were made from the lancewood tree (Dissiliaria baloghioides). The women's implements digging sticks are made from the hardest woods, often ironbark; their points, like those of spears, were hardened by fire. Shields, worked from large lumps of wood, were made from the spotted gum (Corymbia citriodora) and grey mangrove (Avicenia marina). Where it was impractical to use a spear or net to fish (such as small waterholes or broken creeks), various species of plants were used as fish poisons, these included peeled stalks of smartweed (Persicaria hydropiper), crushed leaves of soap tree (Alphitonia excelsa), tie bush (Wickstroemia indica), snake vine (Stephania japonica), white cedar (Melia azederach), cunjevoi (Alocasia macrorrhizos), and quinine bush (Petalostigma pubescens) and the crushed bark of Acacia falcata, Acacia melanoxylon, and Acacia tomentosus; the inner bark of the foam tree (Jagera pseudorhus), a noted fish poison, has high concentrations of saponins. These paralysed the lungs of the fish, making them float to the top of the water, and easier to catch.

== Culture ==
=== Oral culture ===
The seasonal pattern of plants and animals varied, appearing at particular times of the year, and were used as indicators of the season. The migratory patterns of birds was well known, and their seasonal migrations were used to determine if certain resources were available/unavailable. For the Wanggeriburra, the lorikeet indicated the forthcoming mullet season along the coast, while the pied currawong indicated black bream were available. The flowering of particular plant species was also used to indicate resource availability; hop bush (Dodonaea triquetra) indicated the best time for oysters, silk oak (Grevillea robusta) indicated turtles and eels, while tea tree (Melaleuca bracteata) indicated the mullet were available. Species, like Macadamia, had dual uses, such as being planted along travel routes as a food source as well as functioning as markers for travellers. Local groups used oral poems to encode this information. An example of one was recorded by J.A. Gresty, which goes:

Kambullumm wongara
Woojerie bingging
Woodooroo wongara
Woojerie kunneeng

Gresty explained this poem as encoding seasonal information relating to the silky oak and tea tree and the correlation of their flowering to the turtle and mullet seasons respectively. Knowledge of cultural practices, inter-relations, beliefs, and laws was held in stories. These stories, known as Bujeram (The Dreaming), stretch across clan groups, creating what are known as songlines and in some cases explain the creation of prominent features of the landscape or other natural phenomena. In Yugambeh tradition the people descend from one of three brothers, Yarberri or Jabreen who travelled to the north and established the sacred site of Jebbribillum, the point at which he emerged from the waters onto the land. The origin story concerns the legend of three brothers, each of whom established one of the tribes of the area. It tells of the arrival to this part of the eastern Australian coastline by 3 men/mythical culture heroes (Berruġ, Mommóm and Yaburóng)and their wives and children in a canoe.

Long ago, Berruġ together with Mommóm (and) Yabúrong came to this land. They came with their wives and children in a great canoe, from an island across the sea. As they came near the shore, a woman on the land made a song that raised a storm which broke the canoe in pieces, but all the occupants, after battling with the waves, managed to swim ashore. This is how 'the men' the paiġål black race, came to this land. The pieces of the canoe are to be seen to this day. If any one will throw a stone and strike a piece of the canoe, a storm will arise, and the voices of Berrúġ and his boys will be heard calling to one another, amidst the roaring elements. The pieces of the canoe are certain rocks in the sea.

At Ballina, Berrúg looked around and said, nyuġ? and all the paiġål about there say nyuġ to the present day. On the Tweed he said, ġando? (ngahndu)and the Tweed paigål say ġando to the present day. This is how the blacks came to have different dialects. Berrúġ and his brothers came back to the Brunswick River, where he made a fire, and showed the paiġål how to make fire. He taught them their laws about the kippåra, and about marriage and food. After a time, a quarrel arose, and the brothers fought and separated, Mommóm going south, Yaburóng west, and Berrúġ keeping along the coast. This is how the paiġål were separated into tribes.

The legend of the Three Brothers is used to explain the kinship bonds that extend through the Yugambeh-Bundjalung language groups, one Yugambeh descendant writing:

These bonds between Bundjalung and Yugambeh people are revealed through genealogy, and are evident in our common language dialects. Our legends unite us.

Yugambeh people are the descendants of the brother Yarberri who travelled to the north. In Yugambeh legend he is known as Jabreen. Jabreen created his homeland by forming the mountains, the river systems and the flora and fauna. The people grew out of this environment.

Jabreen created the site known as Jebbribillum when he came out of the water onto the land. As he picked up his fighting waddy, the land and water formed into the shape of a rocky outcrop (Little Burleigh). This was the site where people gathered to learn and to share resources created by Jabreen. The ceremony held at this site became known as the Bora and symbolised the initiation of life. Through the ceremony, people learned to care for the land and their role was to preserve its integrity.

Another traditional story tells of battle which resulted in the creation of many landforms and rivers across the region. This battle, between the creatures of the sky, land, and sea, took place at the mouth of the Logan river; W.E. Hanlon recorded a version of this story in his reminiscences, which he titled "The Genesis of Pimpama Island":

In the old days "plenty long before whiteman bin come-up" (the legend runs), all that part of Moreton Bay, from Doogurrumburrum (Honeycomb), now Rocky Point, at the mouth of the Logan River, to Kanaipa (Ironbark spear) was the theatre of a titanic war between all the denizens of the land, the air, and the water then inhabiting that region. In those times the country bordering on this watery tract was high and dry, not like it is now, all swamps and marshes—and mosquitos. The real reason of this epic conflict is obscure, but it is generally supposed that the three main divisions of animal life—terrestrial, aerial, and aquatic—fought, triangularly, for supremacy; birds, flying foxes, sharks, purooises, "goannas", snakes, etc., all participated in the strife. Yowgurra, the goanna, was early in the fray, armed with a spear; but, just as he joined in the melee, Boggaban, the sparrow hawk, swooped down and snatched the spear (juan) out of the grasp of Yowgurra. With this in its hands, it flew over the water and drove the spear into the back of a porpoise that just at that moment exposed itself. The porpoise, with a spear sticking it its back, exerted itself to a mighty blast and blew the weapon out; but there ensued such an incessant torrent of mingled blood and water from the spear wound that all the neighbouring territory became inundated, of channels and creeks of that portion of the Bay, and from this cause originated Pimpama Island Tajingpa (the well), Yawulpah (wasp), Wahgumpa (turkey), Coombabah (a pocket of land), etc., all great areas of swampy country.

The Migunberri Yugambeh have a story of two men, Balugan and Nimbin, and their hunting dingoes, Burrajan, a male, and Ninerung, a female, (Note: "Burrajan was the male dingo and his name may be connected with the word burangdjin, meaning dress or clothes, as in the case of dingo tails worn by adult men at ceremonies. Ninerung was the female dingo; this word is probably the same as ngurun or yurugin." (Steele 1984, p. 79)) whose adventures in chasing a kangaroo from Mt Widgee to the Ilbogan lagoon, mention the location of many djurebil or sacred personal or increase sites, and form the background for explaining the geological features of mountain formations along the McPherson Range. The kangaroo finally leapt into the lagoon where he changed into a warrajum or rainbow serpent, thereafter capable of metamorphosing into many shapes. As they made their way to camp on Mt.Widgee, "wild" blacks from the Beaudesert area (Mununjali clan land) netted them, and set about cooking the two. Smoke from their fire alerted their owners, Balugan and Nimbin, who had been searching for their dogs, and they came across the two half-roasted. They revenged themselves against the other blacks, and wrapped their dingoes in bark for burial back at Mt. Widgee, but, as they carried the corpses away, parts of the animals' bodies dropped off, marking such djurebil places as Mumumbar ( from mummum, forepaw). The two hunting dogs were then buried at the top of the Widgee Falls, above the creek of that name, where they were petrified here at the djurebil of Gundelboonber, with one facing east, the other west. Legend had it that they came back to life at night and would roam throughout the Tweed Valley.

The Ilbogan lagoon is thought in local Aboriginal lore to be connected by a passage to another lagoon, Bungropin, ("the place of parrots") by the Mununjali, and the aquatic warrajum was believed to be capable of travelling underground between the two sites. In 1850, the Moreton Bay Courier reported that a guest at a house close to Bungropin said she had sighted there a creature, whose description she provided the paper. (Note: Moreton Bay Courier, 9 February 1850. The description runs as follows: The head appeared to be elongated and flattened, like the bill of a platypus. The body, from the place where it joined the head, to about five feet backward, seemed like that of a gigantic eel, being of about the ordinary thickness of a man's body. Beyond this it was of much larger apparent size, having the appearance of being coiled into innumerable folds. Beyond those coils was what seemed to be the tail of the animal, which had somewhat the shape of the tail of a fish, but is described as having the semi-transparent appearance of a bladder. The head, which was small and narrow in proportion to the size of the body, was furnished with what seemed to be two horns, which were quite white. Under the circumstances it was, of course, difficult to judge accurately of the whole length of the animal, but, by comparison with other objects, it is supposed that the parts visible above the water must have been thirty feet in extent.)

=== Marriage ===
The Yugambeh believe that Yabirri (Yahbrine, Jabreen) taught them their laws of marriage. Being exogamous, prospective husbands amongst the Yugambeh clans visited and stayed in the territories of their future wives for 1–2 years as, allowing their possible future in-laws to judge their suitability in character and economic provision. This rite was known was Ngarabiny.

A man marries a woman who belongs to the same section and generation as his mother's brother's daughter, and who is, according to the terminology, a relative of the same kind. But she must come from another part of the country, and must not be closely related to him. The normal procedure was described to me as follows. A woman who is "father's sister" to a boy, possibly his own father's sister, would look out for a wife for him. Finding a woman who was her "sister", but not closely related to herself or her nephew, she would induce the latter to promise her daughter in marriage to the boy.

A father's sister is known as a Ngaruny, and she reciprocally calls one Nyugun/Nyugunmahn. A rotation existed within the marriage culture, with men finding wives from one direction, while women found their husbands from the opposite.

The aborigines of the Tweed, Nerang, Coomera, and Albert Rivers were all on very friendly terms and were united by inter-family relation-ships, so that the so-called marriage by capture was between these tribes often a mere formality. Older men from one tribe would pay a visit to another and convey the information that they had a number of attractive young women of marriageable age. "What about some of your young fellows coming over and fighting us for them some night?" they would say. "Why, we were just thinking we might do that one night", would be the reply; "it might be about two nights after full moon." Back would go the visitors and tell their own men that it was just possible the tribe from over the river might be over to capture some of the young women, and about two nights after full moon would seem a likely time. "When they come over, fight them, but don't fight them so hard that they will be too badly knocked about to carry off a few brides."

=== Music ===
Yugambeh music tradition made use of a number of instruments such as the possum skin drum (noted as a woman's instrument), the gum leaf, and the clapsticks. The woman's drumming was noted by many of the early European arrivals and along with the gum leaf were considered distinctive instruments of the area. A corroboree held at Mudgeeraba was said to feature over 600 drumming women, while in the early 20th century gum leaf bands were formed; the first record of such appearing in the Beaudesert Times in 1937.

... last Saturday the natives of Beaudesert and district held a dance at the Technical Hall to assist the funds of the Ambulance Brigade ... A bus load of coloured folk from the Tweed district added to the numbers ... the Gumleaf Band also rendered an item ...

Yugambeh musicians also incorporated western instruments into their songs, such as the accordion (known in Yugambeh language as a "Ganngalmay") and guitar. Candace Kruger, a Yugambeh yarabilgingan (song woman), has been active in creating and teaching a youth choir whose main objectives are to sing (yarrabil) and learn the Yugambeh Language. The choir has performed at a number of national and international events held on Yugambeh country. Kruger, along with other Yugambeh people including her daughter Isabella and cousin, Lann Levinge, have worked with Elders to preserve the Morning Star and Evening Star Songline in a piece commissioned by the Australian Music Examinations Board.

=== Death ===
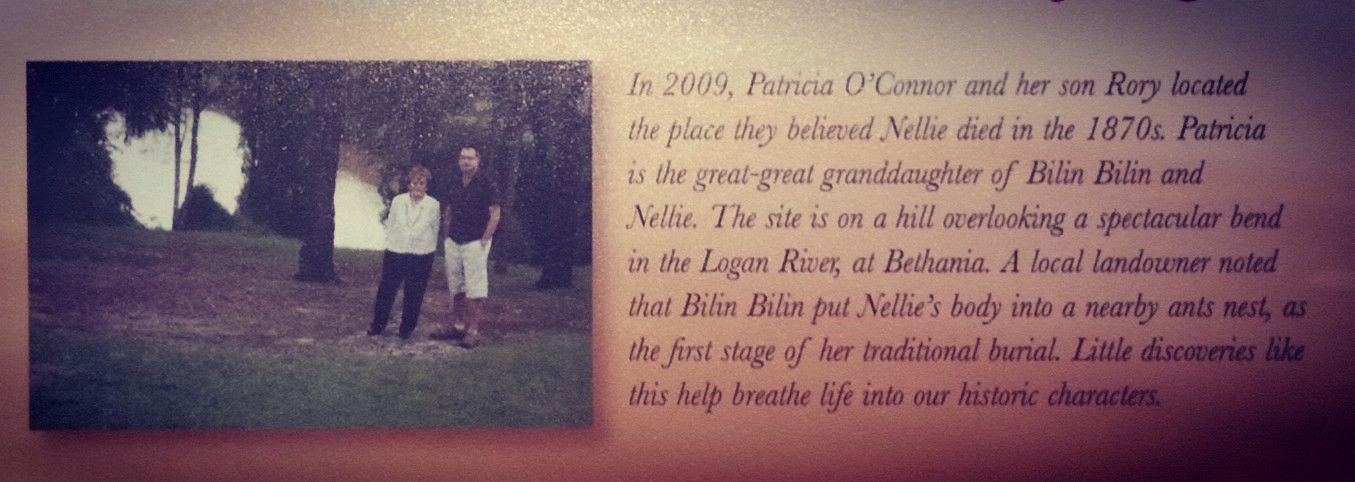
Bilin Bilin Ancestor Panel describing the burial of his wife, Nellie

Yugambeh informants allude to one of more souls, one that lingers at the grave, another that upon death "climbs up to Balugan" in the land of the dead, a third associated with a person's sacred site- djurebil, and possibly the moggai (mokwi), which may have been a distinct spiritual entity haunting the grave and the place of death. Human remains were considered sacred, and burial sites were kept clear of out of respect. Great attention was paid to avoid disturbing previous burials, however if this was to occur, it was imperative to treat the remains with the appropriate respect and ceremony. Burial was a two-staged process, the first of which involved wrapping the body in paper bark and later a blanket tied with a possum-fur string, and temporary interring them within a white ant's nest for a designated time, after which the body was retrieved and a family member, typically the widow of the deceased, would travel with the body during a period of mourning after which they were permanently interred. (Note: Wall Text, Ancestor Panels, Kungala Centre, Yugambeh Museum, Language & Heritage Research Centre, Beenleigh, QLD) On the Tweed River, the body was interred on a hillside in a sitting position, hunched up, probably by the breaking of bones or ligaments. The Migunburri buried their dead in caves and rock clefts. The Beaudesert Mununjali would talk to the corpse while it was being carried slung on a pole to the grave site, trying to elicit by questioning who the sorcerer might have been who caused the death. The body was said to buck violently if the culprit's name was mentioned.

== Native title ==
As of 2019, Yugambeh native title claims on their traditional country have yet to find endorsement by the National Native Title Tribunal. A Kombumerri claim was filed in 1996 over their clan territory, but was not accepted. This was followed by a Kombumerri People #2 claim in 1998, this application was also rejected. A larger Eastern Yugambeh People claim was filed in 2001, it was also rejected. The Eastern Clans Native Title Claim in the Federal Court was filed on 5 September 2006 under the application name Gold Coast Native Title Group (Eastern Yugambeh), and accepted by the Register on 23 September 2013. The application, naming ten Apical Ancestors, referred to territory encompassing lands and waters across the Gold Coast local government area within the state of Queensland. It was dismissed on 13 September 2014 with a Part Determination that Native Title did not exist on lands granted a prior lease. On the rejection of this claim, The Yugambeh clans filed a Native Title Claim in the Federal Court on 27 June 2017 under the application name Danggan Balun (Five Rivers) People. Their claim was accepted for registration by the Registrar on 14 September 2017. It was further amended on 28 August 2020 naming twenty-three Apical Ancestors and encompasses lands and waters across five local government areas within the state of Queensland.

== Notable people ==
=== Arts ===
- Ysola Best - Author, elder
- Shaun Davies – Linguist, activist, media personality
- Lionel Fogarty - Poet
- Rory O'Connor - Author, journalist
- Stephen Page – Artistic director, dancer, choreographer, film director
- David Page – Musician, composer
- Hunter Page-Lochard – Actor
- Ellen van Neerven – Writer
- Chelsea Watego – Academic, writer
- Kirk Page - Actor

=== Business ===
- Phillipa McDermott - Businesswoman

=== Leaders ===
- Bilin Bilin – Indigenous community leader
- Billy Drumley – Indigenous community leader
- Lambert McBride – Activist
- Patricia O'Connor – Elder, language reviver
- Ted Williams - Elder

=== Sports ===
- Tyan Prindable - Australian rules footballer (Collingwood)
- Tony Currie - Rugby league player, Qld, Australia, Rothmans Medallist
- Jamal Fogarty – Rugby league player
- Gary French - Rugby League player
- Lloyd McDermott – Rugby union player, Australia's first indigenous barrister
- Germaine Paulson - Rugby league player
- Thewbelle Philp - Sprinter
- Jamie Sandy - Rugby league player
- Ashley Taylor - Rugby league player
- D’Arcy Short - Cricket Australia

== Alternative spellings and names ==
- Chepara
- Chipara
- Coodjingburra (Note: Transcribed by Tindale as 'Kudjangbara.' (Tindale 1974, p. 79))
- Cudgingberry (name of a Minyungbal clan at Cudgen)
- Gando Minjang
- Gandowal
- Gendo (exonym referring to their language)
- Jugambeir
- Jukam
- Minjangbal (heard at Woodenbong in 1938)
- Minyowa
- Minyung
- Ngandowul
- Tjapera
- Tjipara (horde near Brisbane)
- Yögum
- Yoocum
- Yoocumbah
- Yugambir
- Yuggum
- Yugumbir
- Yukum

Source: Tindale 1974, p. 171

== Some words ==
- dagay (white man/ghost)

== See also ==
- Broadbeach Aboriginal burial ground

== Sources ==
- "2016 Census Community Profiles: Gold Coast (C)". quickstats. Australian Bureau of Statistics.
- "2016 Census Community Profiles: Logan (C)". quickstats. Australian Bureau of Statistics.
- "2016 Census Community Profiles: Scenic Rim (R)". quickstats. Australian Bureau of Statistics.
- "2016 Census Community Profiles: Tweed (A)". quickstats. Australian Bureau of Statistics.
- "Aboriginal Cultural Heritage". Tweed Regional Museum. Archived from the original on 15 June 2016.
- "About Us | Jellurgal Cultural Centre". jellurgal.com.au.
- Aird, Michael (1991). "The reconstruction of cultural heritage". Ngoonjook (6): 61–62.
- Alexandra, Jason; Stanley, Jane (August 2007). Aboriginal Communities and Mixed Agricultural Businesses - Opportunities and future needs (Thesis). Rural Industries Research and Development Corporation, Australian Government.
- Allen, John; Lane, John (1914). "Grammar, Vocabulary, and Notes of the Wangerriburra Tribe" (PDF). Annual Report of the Chief Protector of Aborigines for the year 1913. Brisbane: AIATSIS. pp. 23–36.
- "Application Details". National Native Title Tribunal.
- "Application Details". National Native Title Tribunal.
- "Application Details". National Native Title Tribunal.
- "Australian Standard Classification of Languages (ASCL), 2016: What has changed". Australian Bureau of Statistics. 28 March 2017.
- Bannister, Dennis Daniel (1982). "Aboriginals of the Gold Coast and Hinterland". JOL. Brisbane, QLD.
- Best, Ysola (1994). "An Uneasy Coexistence: An Aboriginal Perspective of Contact History in southeast Queensland" (PDF). Aboriginal History. 18 (1/2): 87–94.
- Best, Ysola; Barlow, Alex (1997). Kombumerri, Saltwater People. Port Melbourne: Heinemann Library Australia. ISBN 978-1-863-91037-8. OCLC 52249982.
- "Bilin Bilin". CBHS Year 5 History.
- Black, C.F. (2017). A Mosaic of Indigenous Legal Thought: Legendary Tales and Other Writings. Routledge. ISBN 978-1-315-39109-0.
- "Borobi the Commonwealth Games Mascot! | Aboriginal and Torres Strait Islander Languages". State Library of Queensland. 6 April 2016. Archived from the original on 24 February 2017.
- Bray, Joshua (21 February 1901). "Tribal districts and customs". Science of Man. 4 (1): 9–10.
- Buchanan, Robyn (1999). "Aboriginal Culture". Logan: Rich in History, Young in Spirit (PDF). Logan City Council. pp. 8–18.
- "Burleigh Bora ring to host memorial service for Gold Coast's Yugambeh and Aboriginal servicemen". Gold Coast Sun. 2 November 2017.
- "Burleigh Heads Aboriginal War Memorial". Queensland War Memorial Register. 16 March 2009.
- Calley, Malcolm (1959). Bandjalang Social Organisation. University of Sydney.
- "Census 2016, Language spoken at home by Sex (SA2+)". Australian Bureau of Statistics. Archived from the original on 26 December 2018.
- "Company History". Kalwun Development Corporation.
- Crosby, Eleanor (2010a). Turnix Report 179. Bahrs Scrub Cultural Heritage Study, Part 1 Report to Logan City Council (PDF). Turnix.
- Crosby, Eleanor (2010b). The Gugingin of Bahrs Scrub: Preliminary Aboriginal Cultural Heritage Field Inspection, Part 2 Report to Logan City Council (PDF). Turnix.
- Crossen, Louise (21 October 2021). "Keeping First Nations languages alive through song". Griffith News. Griffith University.
- Crowley, Terry (1978). The middle Clarence dialects of Bandjalang. Australian Institute of Aboriginal Studies.
- Cunningham, M. (1969). A Description of the Yugumbir Dialect of Bandjalang (PDF). Vol. 1. University of Queensland Papers. pp. 69–122.
- "Danggan Balun". Danggan Balun Aboriginal Corporation. June 2019.
- Davies, Shaun (9 July 2022). Your language is dead: Go learn Bundjalung – Those who said Yugambeh. Australian Languages Workshop 2022. Dunwich, Queensland: Australian Research Council Centre of Excellence for the Dynamics of Language. pp. 1–19.
- "Deebing Creek Mission (former)". Queensland Government. 20 January 2016.
- Drake, Jack (2012). The Outback Vs the Wild West. Boolarong Press. ISBN 978-1-921-92051-6.
- Dyason, Zoe; Ganter, Regina (n.d.). "Hausmann, Johann Gottfried (1811-1901)". Griffith University.
- "E17: Yugambeh". AUSTLANG. AIATSIS.
- "E78: Nganduwal". AUSTLANG. AIATSIS.
- "E79: Ngarahgwal". AUSTLANG. AIATSIS.
- "Eastern Yugambeh People Decision Test" (PDF). National Native Title Tribunal. 2002.
- "Elders take centre stage at Buckingham Palace". NITV. 14 March 2018.
- Evans, Heidi (14 September 2017). "Danggan Balun (Five Rivers) People" (PDF). National Native Title Tribunal.
- Evans, Raymond (1999). Fighting words: writing about race. Queensland, Australia: University of Queensland Press. p. 131. ISBN 070223109-6. OCLC 42469115.
- "Extract from Schedule of Native Title Applications" (PDF). National Native Title Tribunal.
- "Extract from Schedule of Native Title Applications" (PDF). National Native Title Tribunal. 14 September 2017.
- Fison, Lorimer; Howitt, Alfred William (1880). Kamilaroi and Kurnai (PDF). Melbourne: G Robinson – via Internet Archive.
- Ganter, Regina; Vassilief, Lilia (n.d.). "German Missionaries in Australia: Bethesda Mission (1866–1881)". Griffith University.
- "GC2018 Reconciliation Action Plan". Gold Coast 2018 Commonwealth Games. 29 May 2017 – via YouTube.
- Geyteenbeek, Brian; Geyteenbeek, Helen (1971). Gidabal grammar and dictionary. Australian aboriginal studies. Canberra: Australian Institute of Aboriginal Studies. p. vi. ISBN 085575019-7. OCLC 548648 – via Internet Archive.
- Greer, Germaine (2014). White Beech: The Rainforest Years. A&C Black. ISBN 978-1-408-84671-1.
- Gresty, J. A. (1947). "Numinbah Valley: its geography, history and aboriginal associations". Queensland Geographical Journal. 51: 57–72.
- "Guanaba Indigenous Protected Area". Department of the Environment and Energy.
- "Guanaba The Gold Coast, Queensland" (PDF). Department of the Environment and Energy.
- Haglund, Laila (1976). The Broadbeach Aboriginal Burial Ground: An Archaeological Analysis. University of Queensland Press.
- Hanlon, William E. (1935). "The early settlement of the Logan and Albert districts" (PDF). Journal of the Royal Historical Society of Queensland. 2 (5): 208–262.
- Holmer, Nils M. (1983). Linguistic Survey of South-Eastern Queensland. Pacific Linguistics. ISBN 978-0-858-83295-4 – via Internet Archive.
- Horsman, Margaret Joan (1995). Patterns of Settlement, Development and Land Usage: Currumbin Valley 1852–1915 (PDF) (MA thesis). University of Queensland.
- Howitt, Alfred William (1904). The native tribes of south-east Australia (PDF). Macmillan.
- "The International QBR Journey Ends in New Zealand: Queen's Baton Relay". Gold Coast 2018 Commonwealth Games. 23 December 2017 – via YouTube.
- Jefferies, Tony (2011). Guwar, the language of Moreton Island, and its relationship to the Bandjalang and Yagara subgroups: a case for phylogenetic migratory expansion? (MPhil thesis). University of Queensland. OCLC 953518901.
- Kidnapped: Keendahn's story. National Museum Australia.
- Koepping, Klaus-Peter (1977). How to Remain Human in an Asylum: Some Field Notes from Cherbourg Aboriginal Settlement in Queensland.
- "Kombumerri Decision Test" (PDF). National Native Title Tribunal. 1999.
- "Kombumerri People #2 Decision Test" (PDF). National Native Title Tribunal. 1999.
- Kruger, Candace (2005). Yugambeh Talga: Music Traditions of the Yugambeh People. Keeaira Press. ISBN 095811691-1.
- Kruger, Candice (2017). In The Bora Ring: Yugambeh Language and Song Project (PDF) (Thesis). Griffith University. Archived from the original (PDF) on 19 January 2019.
- Livingstone, H. (1892). "Short Grammar and Vocabulary of the Dialect spoken by the Minyung People" (PDF). In Fraser, John (ed.). An Australian language as spoken by the Awabakal, the people of Awaba, or lake Macquarie (near Newcastle, New South Wales) being an account of their language, traditions, and customs. Sydney: C. Potter, Govt. Printer. pp. Appendix 2–27 – via Internet Archive.
- Longhurst, Robert I. (1980). "The Gold Coast: Its First Inhabitants" (PDF). John Oxley Journal: A Bulletin for Historical Research in Queensland. 1 (2): 15–24.
- Macdonald, Gaynor (September 2009). Boundaries of Turrbal-Speaking Territory: An Anthropological Assessment (PDF) (Report). University of Sydney.
- Manning, Jane (series producer) (10 August 2021). Back to Nature - The Green Cauldron (Television production). Australian Broadcasting Corporation.
- Marlow, Karina (1 November 2016). "Hunting for the bunyip of Beaudesert". NITV.
- Mathews, R. H. (1906). "Notes on the Aborigines of the Northern Territory, Western Australia and Queensland". Queensland Geographical Journal. 22: 74–86 – via Internet Archive.
- Meston, A. (25 August 1923). "The Lost Tribes of Moreton Bay". The Brisbane Courier (Qld.: 1864 – 1933). p. 19 – via Trove.
- Meston, Archibald; Small, John Frederick (21 March 1898). "Customs and traditions of the Clarence River aboriginals". Science of Man. 1 (2): 46–47.
- "Minjungbal Aboriginal Cultural Centre". NSW National Parks and Wildlife Service.
- "Mununjali – Housing and Development Company". Mununjali Housing & Development Company.
- NaturallyGC Program (July 2018 – July 2019) (PDF). Gold Coast: City of Gold Coast. 2018. pp. 26–27.
- Nerang Heritage Walk Booklet (PDF). City of Gold Coast Office of City Architect Heritage Unit. 2017. p. 4.
- O'Connor, Rory (1991). Yugambeh in defence of our country – mibun wallul mundindehla ŋaliŋah dhagun. Kombumerri Aboriginal Corporation for Culture.
- "Patricia O'Connor: Female Elder of the Year, 2014". NAIDOC. 1 June 2018.
- Prior, T.de M. M.; Landsborough, W.; White, W.G.; O'Connor, J. (1887). "Between Albert and Tweed Rivers" (PDF). In Curr, Edward Micklethwaite (ed.). The Australian race: its origin, languages, customs, place of landing in Australia and the routes by which it spread itself over the continent. Vol. 3. Melbourne: J. Ferres. pp. 231–239 – via Internet Archive.
- "Purga and Purga Shire". Centre for the Government of Queensland.
- "Queen's Baton Farewelled in Auckland". New Zealand Olympic Committee. 23 December 2017.
- "RAP Governance & Engagement | Gold Coast 2018 Commonwealth Games". Gold Coast 2018.
- Sharpe, Margaret C. (1985). "Bundjalung settlement and migration" (PDF). Aboriginal History. 9 (1): 101–124.
- Sharpe, Margaret C. (1994). "Reviewed Work: Stories of the Bundjalung, Songs & Stories of Australia Vol. 3 by Rhoda Roberts". Vol. 18, no. 1/2. ANU Press. pp. 187–189. JSTOR 24046109.
- Sharpe, Margaret C. (1998). Dictionary of Yugambeh including neighbouring dialects (PDF). Pacific Linguistics. ISBN 0-85883-480-4.
- Sharpe, Margaret C. (2005b). An Introduction to the Yugambeh-Bundjalung Language and its Dialects (4th ed.). Armidale, NSW: University of New England.
- Sharpe, Margaret C. (2007). "A revised view of the verbal suffixes of Yugambeh-Bundjalung". In Siegel, Jeff; Lynch, John Dominic; Eades, Diana (eds.). Language Description, History and Development: Linguistic Indulgence in Memory of Terry Crowley. John Benjamins Publishing. pp. 53–68. ISBN 978-9-027-25252-4.
- Steele, John Gladstone (1984). Aboriginal Pathways: in Southeast Queensland and the Richmond River. University of Queensland Press. ISBN 978-0-702-25742-1.
- Stolz, Greg (21 September 2006). "Tribes feud over claim". The Courier-Mail. Brisbane.
- Tindale, Norman Barnett (1974). Aboriginal Tribes of Australia: Their Terrain, Environmental Controls, Distribution, Limits, and Proper Names. Australian National University Press. ISBN 978-0-708-10741-6.
- "Ukerabagh Island". Office of Environment and Heritage.
- Wafer, Jim; Lissarrague, Amanda, eds. (2008). A handbook of Aboriginal languages of the New South Wales and the Australian Capital Territory. Muurrbay Aboriginal Language and Culture Co-operative. ISBN 978-097753518-7.
- Watson, F. J. Vocabularies of four representative tribes of South Eastern Queensland: with grammatical notes thereof and some notes on manners andcustos: Also, a list of aboriginal place names and their derivations. Brisbane, Queensland: Royal Geographical Society of Australia. OCLC 682056722.
- Wheeler, Belinda; van Neerven, Ellen (December 2016). "An Interview with Heat and Light Author Ellen van Neerven". Antipodes. 30 (2): 294–300. doi:10.13110/antipodes.30.2.0294. JSTOR 10.13110/antipodes.30.2.0294.
- White, Neville; Meehan, Betty, eds. (1990). Hunter-gatherer demography: past and present. University of Sydney. ISBN 086758491-2. OCLC 22886590.
- "Yugambeh Aboriginal War Memorial". Gold Coast Sun.
- "Yugambeh Museum Language and Heritage Research Centre". earthstory.com.au. 2017.
