= Lambert McBride =

Indigenous Australian and Aboriginal citizenship rights activist

Lambert McBride (1918–2002) was an Indigenous Australian and activist for Aboriginal citizenship rights during the 1960s.

== Early life ==
Lambert George McBride, also known as Lambie or Stan McBride, was born on 3 April 1918 at Grady's Creek, near Kyogle, New South Wales, to William Yuke and May McBride. He was a member of the Bundjalung, Yugambeh and Mulinjarli peoples. He worked from the age of 14 as a bullock team driver, timber getter, sugar cane cutter, railway fettler and bridge carpenter. He was a competitive boxer in the Kyogle area from 1938 to 1939 and in Brisbane during the 1940s. He married May Ross in 1942.

== Military service ==
McBride enlisted with the Australian Army in 1941, serving with the 15th Battalion (transport division) during World War II, including the bombing of Townsville in 1942. He was awarded his military service medals in 1997.

== Activism ==
After the war, McBride continued to support his family with work at timber yards at Newstead. McBride and his family moved to a house in the Brisbane suburb of Zillmere in 1956 and he worked at the Brisbane wharves and was a union member. He used his union and church ties to lobby for social justice for Aboriginal Australians. He became an advocate for Aboriginal rights through the 1960s and 1970s, serving as an honorary secretary and later president of the Queensland Council for the Advancement of Aborigines and Torres Strait Islanders (QCAATSI). He later became a life member of the One People of Australia League (OPAL). He and his wife, May actively campaigned for the 1967 referendum campaign which sought to amend the Australian constitution and provide for voting rights for Aboriginal Australians. He and his wife drove across Queensland encouraging Aboriginal Australians to enter their name on the electoral rolls.

McBride assisted in the development of the National Aboriginal Advisory Council. He joined Aboriginal Hostels Limited and actively worked to provide housing for Aboriginal Australians as both an administrator and a night watchman and manager. He was a life member of the Koobara Aboriginal and Torres Strait Islander Kindergarten, Nalingu Aboriginal and Torres Strait Islander Aged Care Respite Centre at Zillmere, and was an adopted Elder of Taigum State School.

== Legacy ==
McBride died in September 2002 and was survived by his children and grandchildren. His wife May McBride also died in 2002.

The Lambert McBride park in Zillmere was named to honour his work in social justice by the Brisbane City Council in 2003.

The Lambert McBride Perpetual Education Bursary was established in 2007 to assist Indigenous students with their tertiary education expenses.

The State Library of Queensland holds papers relating to McBride's work as an activist during the 1967 referendum. The Fryer Library of the University of Queensland also holds papers relating to his and his wife's work in the 1960s.
