= Billy Drumley =

Aboriginal Australian community leader

Billy Drumley (c. 1853–1951) was an Aboriginal Australian community leader whose regular long-distance walk was commemorated in a pilgrimage.

Drumley hailed from the Yugambeh clan in South East Queensland. He was born near Nerang, where his mother's mob was camped at that time. In his youth he competed successfully in athletics, cricket and boxing. He was also exceptionally skilled at woodworking with the broadaxe.

He was known as a strong leader at a time when his people needed him most. His wisdom and foresight kept his extended family together at a time when many Aboriginal clans were being torn apart.

Drumley often walked from Beaudesert to Southport to visit his sister Jenny Graham and her large clan. Whilst his visits were ostensibly sociable, his underlying motive was to ensure the protection and survival of his clan. Drumley would go to Southport to check that his sister was maintaining her side of the agreement and keeping a tight rein on the family on the coast to keep them out of trouble. Drumley was still doing his walk when he was more than 80 years old.

Drumley is remembered by many Aboriginal elders and local people in the regions of Beaudesert, Tamborine, Nerang and Southport. He was known for performing rain dances to calm down storms and would speak in Aboriginal language.

The Drumley Walk - was a three-day pilgrimage from Beaudesert to Southport - was established in 2005 to commemorate the courage of Billy Drumley and his talent at bringing the community together.

The walk who is organised by a local indigenous museum (Yugambeh Museum). Drumley is the most well known aboriginal in the tribe.
