= Geynyan =

Aboriginal Australian people

The Geynyon, also written Keinjan, are an indigenous Australian people of southern Queensland. According to research done by Queensland South Native Title Services entitled South East Regional Research Project 'Geynyan' are in all likelihood a dialect/estate group of the wider Githabul peoples. In May 2021 the Githabul peoples lodged a Native Title claim (Waringh Waringh) over much of the former Warwick Shire within the Southern Downs Regional Council area.

== Country ==
The Geynyon, according to the estimation of Norman Tindale, had 1,400 square miles (3,600 km^{2}) of territory. They ranged from Stanthorpe just north of the border with New South Wales to around Hendon and Allora, which formed their northern limit. To the east, their lands extended as far as the Great Dividing Range. Their western frontier lay around Herries Range and beyond Thane, including Warwick and the area close to Leyburn. R. H. Mathews also claimed Inglewood was part of their territory, which Tindale did not accept. In Margaret Sharpe's map of Bundjalung dialects, based on the work of Terry Crowley, the Logan River marked their eastern border with the Yugambeh, while their southern frontier with the Githabul lay just beyond Killarney.

== Alternative names ==
- Gee-en-yun
- Wawpa (This was an exonym for their language, which was also applied by tribes in the area of the Darling Downs to the Giabal and others.)

Source: Tindale 1974, p. 175

== Sources ==
- MacPherson, J. (1904). "Ngarrabul and other aboriginal tribes: distribution of tribes". Proceedings of the Linnean Society of New South Wales. 29: 677–684. doi:10.5962/bhl.part.20175.
- Mathews, R. H. (1907). "Notes on the aborigines of the Northern Territory, Western Australia, and Queensland" (PDF). Queensland Geographical Journal. 22: 74–86.
- Sharpe, Margaret C. (1985). "Bundjalung Settlement and Migration" (PDF). Aboriginal History. 9 (1): 101–124.
- Tindale, Norman Barnett (1974). "Keinjan (QLD)". Aboriginal Tribes of Australia: Their Terrain, Environmental Controls, Distribution, Limits, and Proper Names. Australian National University Press. Archived from the original on 21 March 2018.
