= Jebribillum Bora Park =

Australian Indigenous site

Coordinates: 28.07704°S 153.44606°E

The Jebribillum Bora Park (also known as Jebbribillum) is located on the south eastern corner of the Gold Coast Highway and 6th Avenue in Burleigh Heads, Queensland, Australia. It contains one of the last intact bora rings on the Gold Coast, which is protected by the Aboriginal and Torres Strait Islander Heritage Protection Act 1984, and the first Queensland War Memorial specifically dedicated to Indigenous service men and women, which is protected by the Gold Coast Local Heritage Register.

== Bora ring ==
John Appel, the grandson of a missionary, played a key role in the preservation of the bora ring from attempts at destruction. It was gazetted as a reserve (Reserve 782) by the Nerang Shire Council in 1913 in order to stop the site from being divided into housing allotments. The bora ring survived further attempts to destroy it in 1929 and 1941. Later proposals to construct a sports ground or cattle compound on the site did not proceed, but the request of the Returned and Services League of Australia to erect a small hall beside the bora ring was approved and did go ahead. By the 1950s, an earlier rail fence surrounding the bora ring was in poor repair, and the Lands Department reported that little remained of the site.

In 1954, both the Queensland Naturalists' Club and the Queensland Anthropological Society formally refuted the claims of the Lands Department and publicly reported in newspapers on the bora ring's good state of preservation. They strongly lobbied its custodians, the local government, to protect what was increasingly seen as an irreplaceable and significant site. Their lobbying was successful, and the local government agreed to preserve the site.

In 1962 reclamation work of the bora ring was undertaken by the Burleigh Heads Lions Club. They constructed a gateway, a protective fence decorated with boomerangs encircling the site and a memorial cairn in the centre of the ring. A ceremony, which included five corroborees performed by 35 Indigenous people who travelled from Cherbourg, took place at the conclusion of the twelve-month project, when the bora ring was re-entrusted to the care of the Gold Coast City Council to be preserved.

== Bora Memorial Rock ==
The Bora Memorial Rock was installed beside the bora ring in 1991 and has a special association with the Yugambeh people. It is dedicated to Indigenous men and women who served in Australian wars between 1914 and 1991.

The rock for the memorial was brought from Tambourine Mountain, and the artwork of tribal totems was designed and painted with local ochre by Marshall Bell in consultation with the Kombumerri Aboriginal Corporation.
