= Patricia O'Connor (elder) =

Australian Aboriginal elder

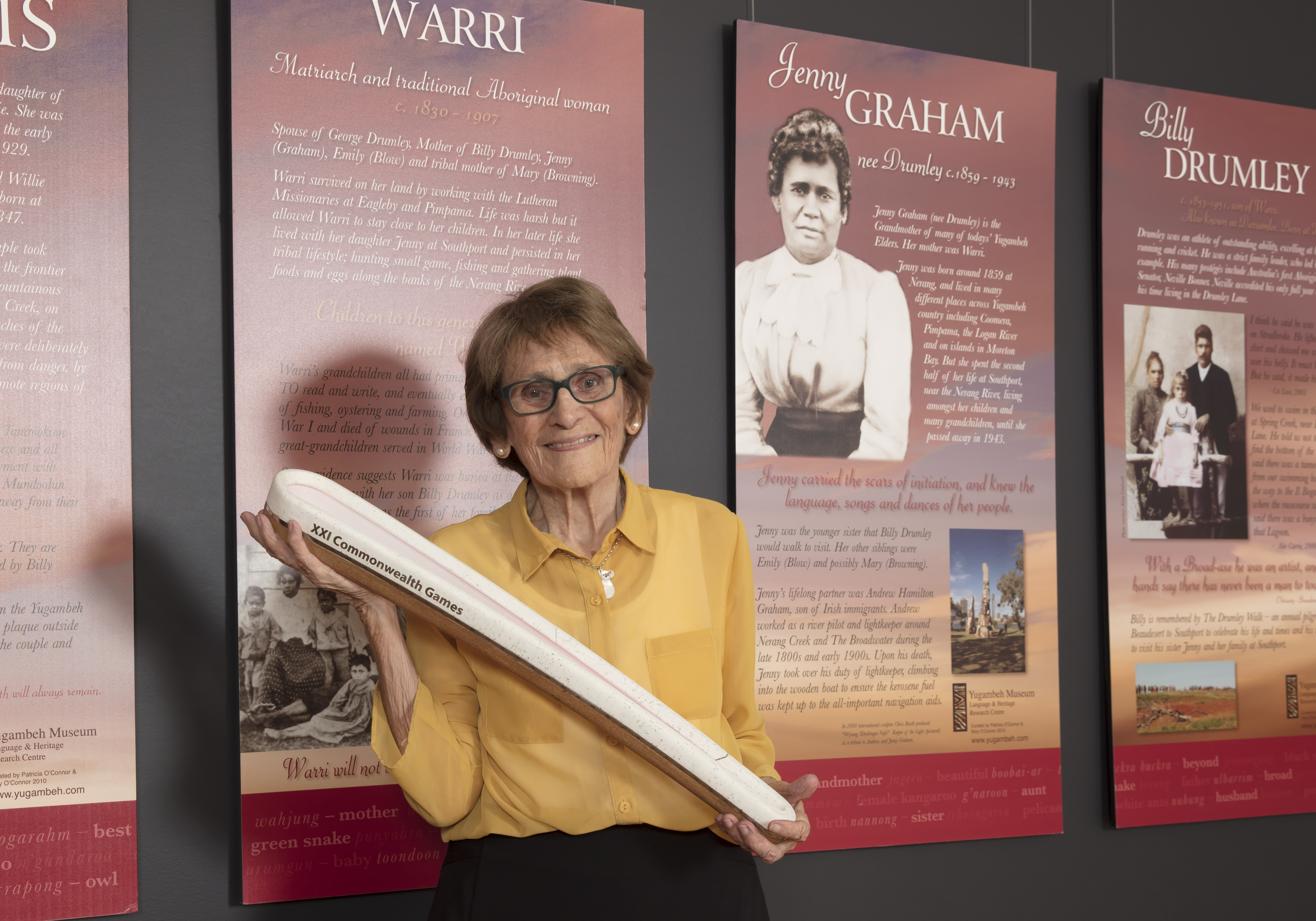
- O'Connor with the Queen's Baton at Yugambeh Museum in 2018
- Born: Patricia Yuke; 1928 (age 97–98); Beaudesert, Queensland
- Occupation: Aboriginal elder
- Known for: Reviving the Yugambeh language

Patricia O'Connor (née Yuke, born 1928) is an Australian Aboriginal elder of the Yugambeh people. She is known for her work in reviving the Yugambeh language and opening the Yugambeh Museum. In 2014 she received the NAIDOC Award for Female Elder of the Year, and in 2019 she was named a Queensland Great.

== Early and personal life ==
Patricia O'Connor was born (Patricia Yuke) in Beaudesert, Queensland in 1928 to mother Edith Graham and father Stanley Yuke, who also had four other children. Their family lineage intersects with King Bilin Bilin (King Jackey of the Logan and Pimpama) who was a prominent and well documented historical leader for the Yugumbeh people. Patricia's family lineage is tied to the Kombumerri "Saltwater" clan, Yugumbeh and Bundjalung peoples. She is a direct descendant from Andrew Hamilton Graham and Jenny McGussy (Jenny Graham) who formed the contemporary Kombumerri - Yugambeh family lineage. Whose connections further weave into other legacy families of the region, including the Yuke, Williams and Dillon families.

Patricia grew up near Kooralbyn in the Scenic Rim Region.Patricia is a member of the Yugambeh people, an Australian Aboriginal group whose traditional lands are located in South East Queensland and the Northern Rivers area of New South Wales. Patricia spent time in Southport, Minjerribah and Beaudesert throughout her life around her family and community. She married Terrence Michael O'Connor, and had eight children (seven boys, one girl) in Brisbane (including Rory O'Connor and Faith O'Connor). Patricia has thirteen grandchildren.

== Career ==
O'Connor has spent much of her life working as an advocate for Yugambeh issues. In the 1980s, for example, she was part of a team which negotiated the largest ever repatriation of Aboriginal remains. Then, in 1991, she and her sister Ysola Best led the organisation and installation of the Yugambeh War Memorial in Jebribillum Bora Park, Burleigh Heads, which was the first war memorial in Australia dedicated to Indigenous soldiers.

In 2018 she played a prominent role during the Commonwealth Games, which were being held on the Gold Coast that year, as a traditional custodian of the land on which the event was being held with her cousin Ted Williams. She accompanied Queen Elizabeth II on stage at the launch of the Queen's Baton Relay at Buckingham Palace, and the baton itself was made partly of macadamia wood because of a story told by O'Connor to its designers. She also gave the Welcome to Country at the opening ceremony.

She is, however, probably best known for her work in restoring the Yugambeh language. In the 1980s, the language was considered by academics to be dead before O'Connor and her sister began to record it in an attempt at revival. She opened the Yugambeh Museum to help with this goal and, as a result, the language is now taught in numerous schools and education centres as of 2020.

== Honours ==
In 2014, O'Connor received the Female Elder of the Year award at the NAIDOC Awards.

Then, in 2019, the Queensland Government named her a Queensland Great, an honour which "recognises the efforts and achievements of remarkable individuals... for their invaluable contribution to the history and development of [the] state".
