= Bilin Bilin =

Indigenous Australian leader

Jackey Jackey
- King of the Logan and Pimpama
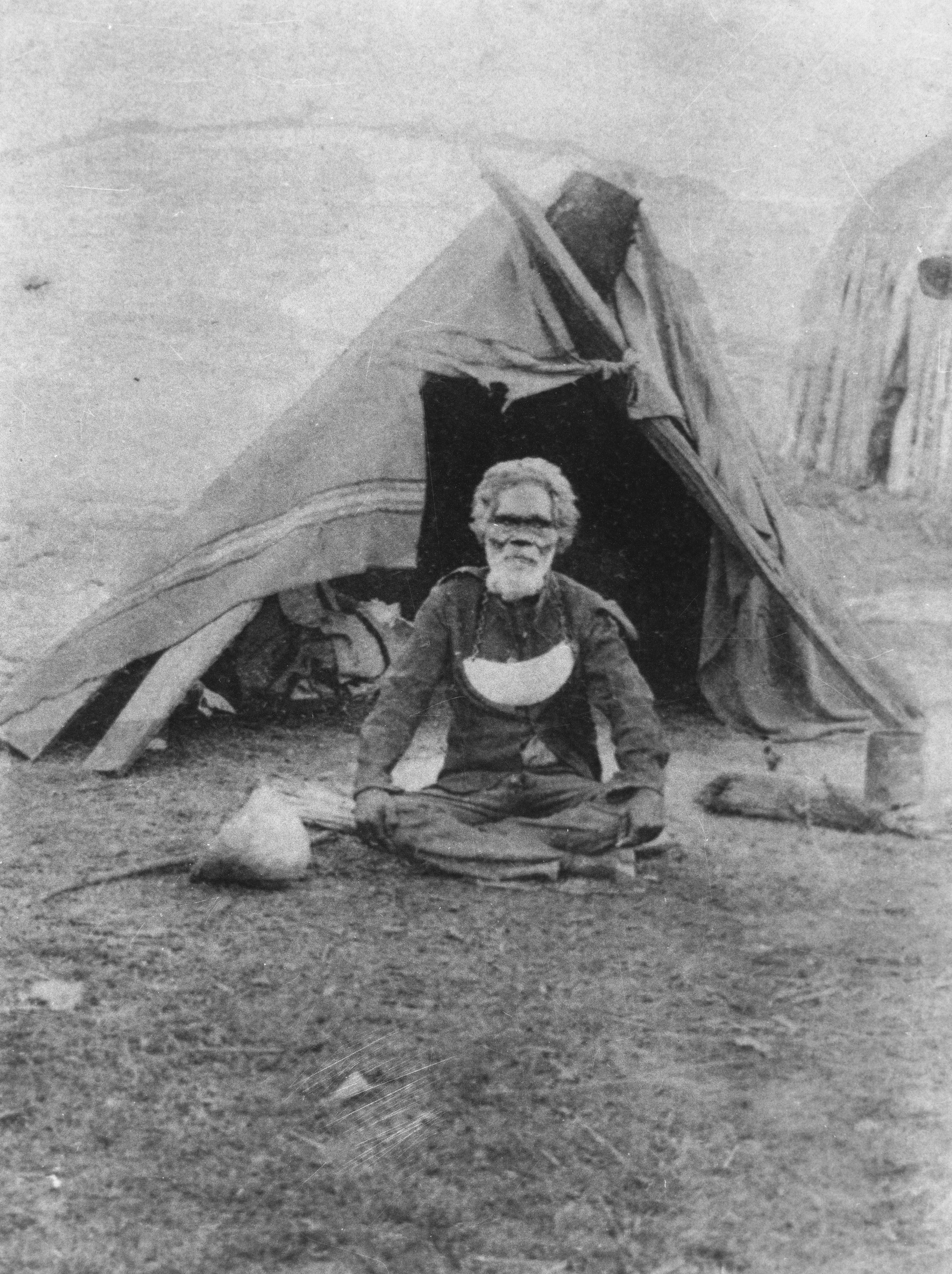
- Sitting at the Deebing Creek Aboriginal Mission, circa 1900
- Reign: 1863–1901
- Born: Bilin Bilin c. 1820
- Died: 1901
- Religion: Aboriginal religion

Bilin Bilin (born c. 1820; died 1901) was a member of the Yugambeh/Bundjalung people in Australia, who gained respect of the European colonials and received a king plate for it. He was given the title 'Jackey Jackey – King of the Logan and Pimpama'.

Alternate names for him include Jackey Jackey, Kawae Kawae, John Logan, and Bilinba.

Bilin Bilin chose to work with the Europeans and be friendly to Christianity, in so much as distributing Bibles, while maintaining his traditional beliefs. In his case, favoring diplomacy over confrontation helped his ability to stay on his ancestral land for most of his life. His diplomacy included demanding equal wages for his people and encouraging them not to leave their land. A Lutheran Pastor, Haussmann, taught him to read and write.
