= Gold Coast Sun =

Newspaper in Queensland, Australia

- Type: Weekly newspaper
- Website: Official website

The Gold Coast Sun was a weekly newspaper serving Australia's Gold Coast region.

== History ==
The newspaper was established in March 1967 and was Australia's most-read community newspaper. It was originally published from an office in Surfers Paradise from the late 1960s until the 1980s when it relocated first to Southport and then to a warehouse on Enterprise Street in Molendinar in 1986. The Gold Coast Bulletin purchased the Gold Coast Sun in 1977 from Sam White. Rogin Taylor was appointed Manager and Editor and remained in the 'chair' until 1986. It was bought by News Corporation in 1987 along with its new sister paper, the Gold Coast Bulletin.

The Sun expanded from one edition to three in 1989 when it began publishing the Southport, Gold Coast and Hinterland Suns. Its editors in the 1970s and 1980s included Rogin Taylor and Dr Lionel Hurst. The Sun rapidly increased in size through the 1990s and early 2000s under editor Feyne Weaver who took the paper to a PANPA award win in 2005. Weaver retired from the Sun in 2006 and was replaced as editor by Shane Watson who expanded the paper to five editions, including the Upper North and Tweed.

The Sun and its staff relocated to the Gold Coast Bulletin's Molendinar complex in 2009 and to Southport's Seabank building in September 2013.

Along with a number of other local Australian newspapers owned by NewsCorp, the newspaper ceased publication in June 2020.

== See also ==
- List of newspapers in Australia
