= Borobi =

Mascot of the 2018 Commonwealth Games

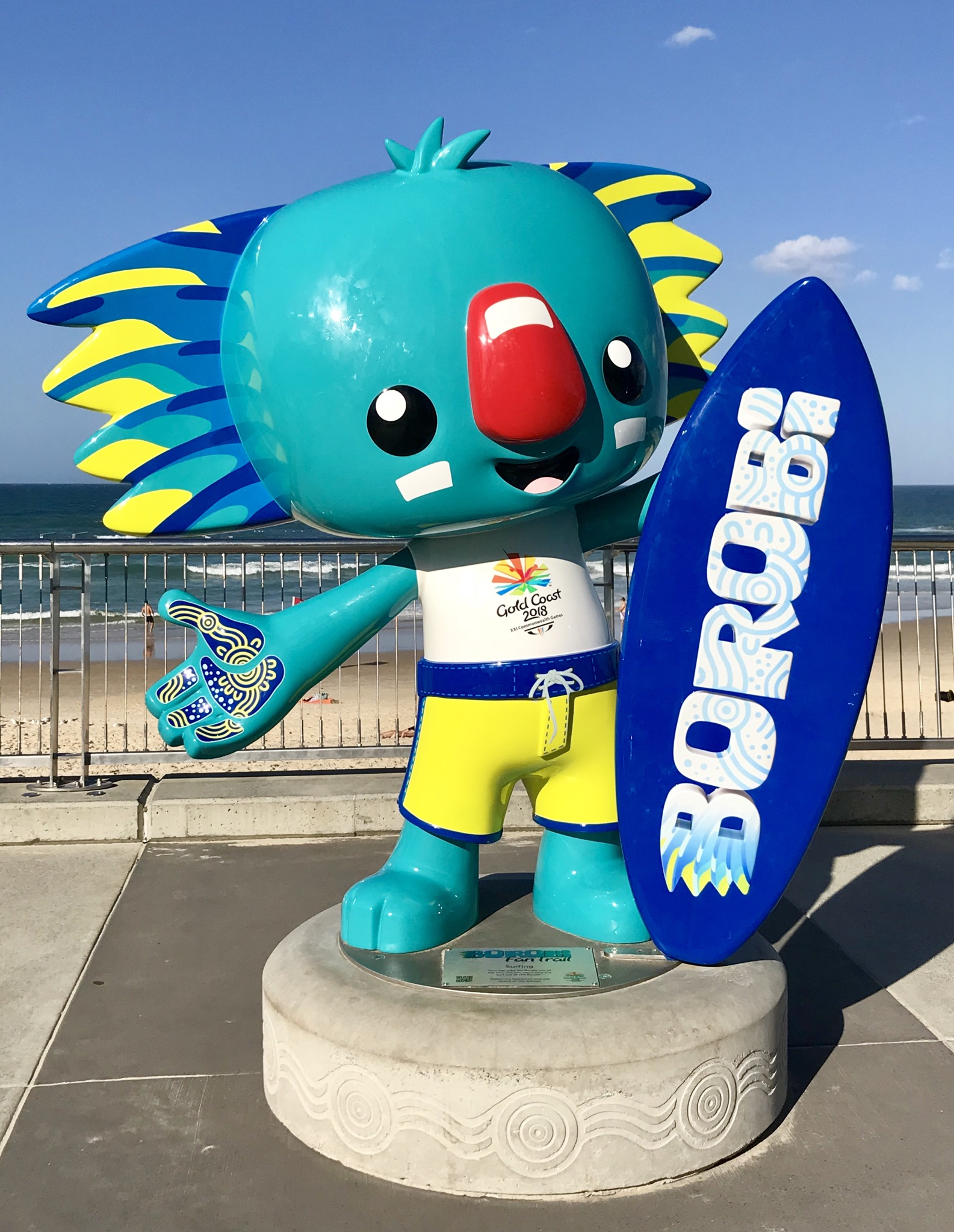
- A statue of Borobi at Surfers Paradise, Queensland
- Created by: Merrilyn Krohn Ian Anderson Zenon Kohler Ralph Barnett Chern'ee Sutton

In-universe information
- Species: Koala
- Gender: Male
- Nationality: Australian

Borobi was the official mascot of the 2018 Commonwealth Games, in Gold Coast, Queensland, Australia. Borobi is a male koala with blue fur and markings on his paws designed by Aboriginal artist Chern'ee Sutton. The name Borobi is derived from the language of the Yugambeh people, an indigenous Australian group from the Gold Coast region. The mascot, along with its fictional back story, was revealed in April 2016. Borobi is based on a character submitted by Merrilyn Krohn, the winner of the GC2018 Mascot Design Competition.

The Borobi Fan Trail is a trail of Borobi's footprints stretching from Southport to Broadbeach that was designed to encourage visitors to walk throughout the Games. Along the trail are several statues of Borobi dressed in attire for different sports.

In 2019, Borobi was announced to serve as the animated "Indigenous language champion" to promote the local Yugambeh language and culture. The first annual "Borobi Day" was celebrated on 31 May 2019 in order to raise awareness of indigenous languages in Australia.

== See also ==
- List of Australian sporting mascots
- List of Commonwealth Games mascots
