= Mununjali clan =

Aboriginal Australian people

The Mununjali clan is one of nine distinct named clan estate groups of the Yugambeh people, an Aboriginal Australian nation whose traditional lands are the Beaudesert area in the Scenic Rim, Queensland, Australia.

== Name ==
The ethnonym Mununjali has been related to a Yugambeh word, munun, which refers to a type of "black soil" with -jali meaning "people" and thus means "Black Earth People". Their country was typified by the abundance of black soil.

== Language ==
Mununjali
- Manaldjali, Wanggeriburra
- Native to: Australia
- Region: Queensland
- Ethnicity: Mununjali, Wanggeriburra
- Language family: Pama–Nyungan: Bandjalangic; Yugambeh; Mununjali

Language codes
- ISO 639-3: –
- Glottolog: None
- AIATSIS: E76

The Mununjali people spoke a dialect, of which a few hundred words have been preserved, of the Yugambeh language.

Knowledge of the grammar and vocabulary was recorded from Joe Culham, son of Coolum known as the "King of the Mununjali", by Margaret Sharpe in 1968 and the Swedish linguist Nils Holmer compiled a grammar and dictionary from Mununjali people in 1978.

Comparisons with neighbouring clan word lists such as the Wanggeriburra's supplied by John Allen in 1913 showed they spoke the same variety of language.

== Country ==
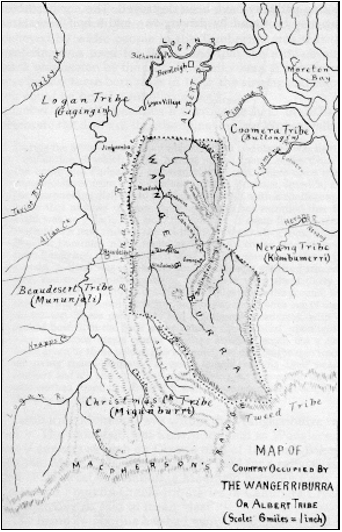
Partial Yugambeh clan map circa 1913

Their tribal boundaries are said to have extended east to the Birnam range, north to Jimboomba, south to Tamrookum, and west to the Teviot Brook.

According to John Allen's map, the Mununjali were located south of the Gugingin clan on the Logan River, centred in Beaudesert and north of the Migunburri, with the Wangerriburra in the hinterland to their east.

== Notable people ==
- Ashley Taylor, rugby league footballer
- Ellen van Neerven, award-winning writer and poet
- Chelsea Watego, academic and writer
- Germaine Paulson, rugby player
- Joanna Lindgren, politician
- Wayne Blair, writer, actor, and director
- Jamal Fogarty, rugby player

== See also ==
- Wanggeriburra clan
- Kombumerri clan

== Sources ==
- Allen, John; Lane, John (1914). "Grammar, Vocabulary, and Notes of the Wangerriburra Tribe" (PDF). Annual Report of the Chief Protector of Aborigines for the year 1913. Brisbane: Anthony James Cumming for the Queensland Government. pp. 23–36.
- Crowley, Terry (1978). The middle Clarence dialects of Bandjalang. Australian Institute of Aboriginal Studies.
