= Wanggeriburra clan =

Aboriginal Australian people

The Wanggeriburra clan are one of nine distinct named clan estate groups of the Yugambeh people and the name refers to the Indigenous people of the Tamborine area in the Scenic Rim, Queensland, Australia.

== Name ==
The ethnonym Wanggeriburra has been related to a Yugambeh word, Wanggeri, which refers to the Pretty-faced Wallaby with -burra meaning "people" and thus means "Pretty-faced Wallaby People". This may have been a clan totem or food source that typified their country.

== Language ==
The Wanggeriburra people spoke a dialect, of which over a thousand words have been preserved, of the Yugambeh language. Knowledge of the grammar and vocabulary was recorded by John Allen (Aboriginal name Bullum) with the assistance of John Lane in 1913.

Comparisons with neighbouring clan words lists showed they spoke the same variety of language as the Mununjali.

== Country ==
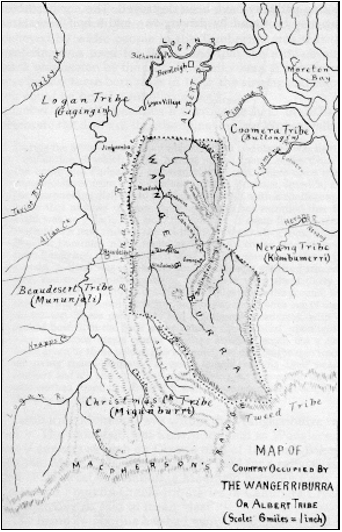
Partial Yugambeh Clan Map circa 1913

According to John Allen's map their tribal boundaries are said to have extended north to Cedar Creek, west to the Birnam range, south to the Mcacpherson range, with the headwaters of the Coomera River and the Darlington Range on their east.

The Wanggeriburra were located south of the Gugingin clan on the Logan River, in the Tamborine area, north of the Tulgigin, with the Bullongin and Kombumerri to their east.

== See also ==
- Yugambeh people
- Mununjali clan
- Kombumerri clan

== Sources ==
- Allen, John; Lane, John (1914). "Grammar, Vocabulary, and Notes of the Wangerriburra Tribe" (PDF). Annual Report of the Chief Protector of Aborigines for the year 1913. Brisbane: Anthony James Cumming for the Queensland Government. pp. 23–36.
- Crowley, Terry (1978). The middle Clarence dialects of Bandjalang. Australian Institute of Aboriginal Studies.
