= Val Attenbrow =

Australian archaeologist (1942–2026)

Val Attenbrow FAHA
- Attenbrow in 1992–1993, directing archaeological excavations at Balmoral Beach, Sydney
- Born: 21 November 1942; Sydney, New South Wales, Australia
- Died: 5 May 2026 (aged 83); Woollahra, New South Wales, Australia
- Occupation: Archaeologist
- Awards: AMRI Lifetime Achievement Award; John Mulvaney Book Award; Rhys Jones Medal

Academic background
- Education: University of Sydney
- Thesis: The Upper Mangrove Creek Catchment: a study of quantitative changes in the archaeological record (1986)

Academic work
- Discipline: Archaeology
- Sub-discipline: Aboriginal archaeology, lithic analysis
- Institutions: Australian Museum
- Notable works: Sydney's Aboriginal Past: Investigating the Archaeological and Historical Records; What's Changing: Population Size or Land-use Patterns? The Archaeology of Upper Mangrove Creek, Sydney Basin

Valerie Jane Attenbrow FAHA (21 November 1942 – 5 May 2026) was an Australian archaeologist and a research scientist at the Australian Museum. Her research has focused on the Holocene period subsistence patterns, resource use and stone artefact technologies of Aboriginal people, particularly in south-eastern Australia. She was recognised as belonging to an important, discipline shaping network of female archaeologists in the history of archaeology in Australia.

== Early life and education ==
Attenbrow was inspired to study archaeology after living in Europe for five years in the 1960s. Attenbrow commenced her archaeological studies as a mature aged student in the Department of Anthropology at the University of Sydney where she obtained a Bachelor of Arts Honours degree in 1976. She initially focused on the archaeology of Europe and the Mediterranean, but ended up focusing on the archaeology Aboriginal Australia, due to the influence of key lecturers and her love of bushwalking.

She returned to the University of Sydney and completed her PhD in 1987 with a thesis entitled The Upper Mangrove Creek Catchment: a study of quantitative changes in the archaeological record.

== Career and research ==
Attenbrow initially worked as a consulting archaeologist in the private sector before joining the National Parks and Wildlife Service (New South Wales) as a cultural heritage officer. She played an important early role in the Australian Association of Consulting Archaeologists and was its president in 1984. Beginning in 1978 she undertook fieldwork as a part of a major regional study in Upper Mangrove Creek near Wyong on the New South Wales central coast. This work was carried out as salvage archaeology prior to its inundation by the construction of Mangrove Creek Dam.

In 1989 she was appointed a research scientist in the then Anthropology Research Section of the Australian Museum. In this role she was a researcher in the Lightning Brothers Project in Wardaman Country, Northern Territory. As part of this project she published research reassessing the timing and spread of point technologies in the region.

She served as co-editor, alongside Betty Meehan, of the peer-reviewed journal Australian Archaeology from 1989 to 1992 and as editor of Short Reports from 1996 to 1999.

In 1989 Attenbrow initiated the large-scale Port Jackson Archaeological Project, focusing on the archaeology of the Sydney Basin. Excavations were conducted at Balmoral, Cammeray, Castle Cove, and Vaucluse. The work undertaken as part of this project formed a major component of her comprehensive study of the archaeology of the Aboriginal people of the Sydney area, which was published in 2002, entitled Sydney’s Aboriginal Past: Investigating the Archaeological and Historical Records. An updated second edition was published in 2010.

Attenbrow was an expert contributor to a lithics workshop hosted at the Australian Museum and funded by the Australian Institute of Aboriginal and Torres Strait Islander Studies as an attempt to revise and update Australian Aboriginal stone implements: including bone, shell and tooth implements written by her predecessor at the Australian Museum, Fred McCarthy.

She later published a major update of her PhD thesis, revising her initial interpretation of the data from Upper Mangrove Creek. The monograph proposed a new model highlighting changes in patterns of land use, habitation, mobility and artefact production, as opposed to demographic changes, that shaped the study area's archaeological record. This formed part of a larger project revising older models of intensification and critiquing simplistic models of demographic change in the Holocene. A major component of this work was a reassessment of timing of the spread and proliferation of backed artefacts and their function.

Her final major research project focused on mapping the social networks linked to the trade of ground-edged artefacts in and around the Sydney Basin and the Central Coast during the Holocene. This relied on identifying the locations of source material using X-ray fluorescence spectroscopy. The project also reassessed aspects of ground-edged artefact function.

== Death ==
Attenbrow died on 5 May 2026, at the age of 84.

== Awards and recognition ==
Attenbrow was a co-author of the paper, Of Lightning Brothers and White Cockatoos: dating the antiquity of signifying systems in the Northern Territory, Australia, that won the inaugural Antiquity prize for best paper in 1994.

In 2002, Attenbrow was made a Life Member of the Australian Archaeological Association (AAA) for her contributions to the association, which she first became a member of in the mid-1970s. In 2004 Attenbrow won the inaugural John Mulvaney Book Award from the AAA for Sydney's Aboriginal Past. Subsequently, the book was featured as part of a display at the Australian Museum. In 2019, Attenbrow was awarded the Rhys Jones Medal, the highest award offered by the AAA, in recognition of her outstanding and sustained contribution to the field of archaeology in Australia.

Attenbrow was elected as a Fellow of the Australian Academy of the Humanities in 2009.

In 2011, Attenbrow's colleagues at the Australian Museum produced a festschrift in the journal Technical Reports of the Australian Museum Online dedicated to her "because she has had a major impact in all the areas of Australian archaeology that are highlighted in the papers included"; the volume was entitled "Changing Perspectives in Australian Archaeology". In its preface, it was noted by editors Jim Specht and Robin Torrence that:

One of the features of Attenbrow’s work over the last three and a half decades has been her willingness to undertake long-term projects that do not yield immediate results, but with meticulous attention to detail and resolution of methodological and theoretical issues, she has brought them all to fruition.

In 2020 she was awarded an Australian Museum Research Institute Lifetime Achievement Award.

== Selected publications ==
=== Books ===
- Attenbrow, V. (2010). Sydney's Aboriginal past: investigating the archaeological and historical records. Sydney, University of New South Wales Press.
- Attenbrow, V. (2006). What's changing: population size or land-use patterns? The archaeology of Upper Mangrove Creek, Sydney Basin. Canberra, ANU E Press.
- Hiscock, P. and V. Attenbrow (2005) Australia's Eastern Regional Sequence revisited: Technology and change at Capertee 3. British Archaeological Reports. International Monograph Series 1397. Oxford: Archaeopress.

=== Articles and chapters ===
- Robertson, G., V. Attenbrow and P. Hiscock (2019). "Residue and use-wear analysis of non-backed retouched artefacts from Deep Creek Shelter, Sydney Basin: implications for the role of backed artefacts." Archaeology in Oceania 52(2): 1-17.
- Attenbrow, V. and P. Hiscock (2015). "Dates and demography: are radiometric dates a robust proxy for long‐term prehistoric demographic change?" Archaeology in Oceania 50(S1): 30-36.
- Grave, P., V. Attenbrow, L. Sutherland, R. Pogson and N. Forster (2012). "Non-destructive pXRF of mafic stone tools." Journal of Archaeological Science 39(6): 1674-1686.
- Robertson, G., V. Attenbrow and P. Hiscock (2009). "Multiple uses for Australian backed artefacts." Antiquity 83(320): 296-308.
- Attenbrow, V., G. Robertson and P. Hiscock (2009). "The changing abundance of backed artefacts in south-eastern Australia: a response to Holocene climate change?" Journal of Archaeological Science 36: 2765-2770.
- Attenbrow, V., T. Doelman and T. Corkill (2008). "Organizing the manufacture of Bondi points at Balmoral Beach, Middle Harbour, Sydney, NSW, Australia." Archaeology in Oceania 43: 104-119.
- Hiscock, P. and V. Attenbrow (2004). "A revised sequence of backed artefact production at Capertee 3, New South Wales." Archaeology in Oceania 39: 94-99.
- Hiscock, P. and V. Attenbrow (2003). "Early Australian implement variation: a reduction model." Journal of Archaeological Science 30: 239-249.

== See also ==
- Archaeology of Australia
- Josephine Flood
- Peter Hiscock
- Isabel McBryde
- Stone artefacts
