= Peter Hiscock =

Australian archaeologist

Peter Dixon Hiscock (born 27 March 1957) is an Australian archaeologist. Born in Melbourne, he obtained a PhD from the University of Queensland and a DSc from the Australian National University. Between 2013 and 2021, he was the inaugural Tom Austen Brown Professor of Australian Archaeology at the University of Sydney, having previously held a position in the School of Archaeology and Anthropology at the Australian National University.

Hiscock specialises in ancient lithic technologies and has worked in Australia, France and Southern Africa. He is a Fellow of the Society of Antiquaries of London, a Fellow of the Australian Academy of the Humanities and an Honorary Fellow of the Australian Museum. His research includes work in lithic technology, archaeology of Indigenous Australia, global dispersion of modern humans and the study of the hominin species Homo neanderthalensis.

== Archaeological work ==
=== Lithic technology ===
Hiscock has been an advocate for quantitative, materialist approaches to lithic analysis. He has produced major works developing and refining indices of reduction for retouched flakes.

=== Australian archaeology ===
In addition to his work on lithic technology in Australia, Hiscock has contributed to a reinterpretation of the archaeology of Indigenous Australia. His work on colonisation and settlement, with Lynley Wallis, created the "Desert Transformation" model, which proposed that about 50,000 years ago human colonists dispersed across much of the Australian continent at a time when the deserts were less harsh than today. These early settlers then gradually adapted to the onset of harsher environments that occurred after approximately 35,000 years ago.

His work with Val Attenbrow and Gail Robertson re-evaluated the timing, spread and function of backed artefacts within ancestral Indigenous Australian societies, arguing that the proliferation of backed artefacts along the east coast of Australia was a technological response to increasingly variable climatic conditions brought about by the onset of the El Niño-Southern Oscillation during the mid-Holocene. Subsequent work has argued that proliferation of back artefacts is a form of social signalling and that shape variation reflects rehafting events.

His work with Patrick Faulkner also led to a reconsideration of the large Anadara granosa shell mounds of northern Australia. Hiscock was funded with Dr. Alex Mackay for an Australian Research Council post-doctoral fellowship project titled "Technology and behavioural evolution in late Pleistocene Africa, Europe and Australia" (DP1092445) worth more than A$400,000 in 2010. The aim of this project was to focus on excavations in Africa, making comparisons with other areas of the world including Australia.

His major contribution to archaeology of Indigenous Australia has been a new synthesis of the subject, in a book titled Archaeology of Ancient Australia. In that volume he advanced the view that there was little evidence for directional change in ancient Australian societies and that the archaeological evidence was better seen as documenting a long series of adaptive changes, perhaps operating in multiple directions, rather than progress towards "intensification" in the recent past (as espoused by archaeologists such as Harry Lourandos). This view was founded on a strong critique of the value of ethnography in the construction of narratives about the deep past, arguing that ethnographic analogy had often imposed images of the lifestyle of recent Indigenous Australians on the different lives of their distant ancestors. Brian M. Fagan has suggested that in doing so Hiscock has attacked the tyranny of the ethnographic record that has dogged Australian archaeology for generations. In this he has disputed the views of archaeologists such as Josephine Flood, who considers ethnographic information can help understand prehistoric behavior.

Hiscock has written on the development of Aboriginal Australian religious beliefs and the impact that the British invasion of 1788 and the introduction of Christian belief system had on them.

Hiscock's argument also emphasized the likely failure of much of the Pleistocene archaeological record to preserve, arguing that the apparent simplicity of early eras resulted partly from the poverty of the archaeological evidence. Interpreting the available archaeological and genetic evidence from these view points, Hiscock presented a novel narrative of Australian prehistory, in which population sizes fluctuated through time in response to environmental productivity, the physical characteristics of people varied as climate and gene flow altered, and the economic, social, and ideological systems adjusted to accommodate and incorporate the circumstances of each time period.

=== Other work ===
Hiscock has also written about the depiction of archaeology and archaeologists in popular media.

== Awards ==
Hiscock received the John Mulvaney Book Award in 2008 from the Australian Archaeological Association for his publication The Archaeology of Ancient Australia, which was acclaimed for its way of dealing "with the archaeological data as free-standing, and the long duree as the basic structure, suitable for the dating methods and accumulative and taphonomic process of most of the Australian record". He also was awarded a Doctor of Science (DSc) degree at the Australian National University.

== Selected publications ==
=== Books ===
- Hiscock, P. (2008) Archaeology of Ancient Australia. Routledge: London.
- Hiscock, P. and Attenbrow, V. (2005) Australia's Eastern Regional Sequence revisited: Technology and change at Capertee 3. British Archaeological Reports. International Monograph Series 1397. Oxford: Archaeopress.
- Veth, P., Smith, M. and Hiscock, P. (2005) Desert Peoples: archaeological perspectives. Blackwell.

=== Articles and chapters ===
- Hiscock, P. and T. Maloney (2017). "Australian lithic technology: evolution, dispersion and connectivity." Routledge handbook of archaeology and globalization: 301–318.
- Hiscock, P. (2017). "Discovery curves, colonisation and Madjedbebe." Australian Archaeology: 1–4.
- Hiscock, P., S. O’Connor, J. Balme and T. Maloney (2016). "World’s earliest ground-edge axe production coincides with human colonisation of Australia." Australian Archaeology 82(1): 2–11.
- Hiscock, P. (2014). "Geographical variation in Australian backed artefacts: trialling a new index of symmetry." Australian Archaeology 74: 124–130.
- Hiscock, P. (2012). "Dancing on pins: Tension between clever theory and material records in Australian archaeology." Australian Archaeology 74: 25–26.
- Hiscock, P. and A. Tabrett (2010). "Generalization, inference and the quantification of lithic reduction." World Archaeology 42(4): 545–561.
- Hiscock, P. and Clarkson, C. (2009) "The reality of reduction experiments and the GIUR: reply to Eren and Sampson". Journal of Archaeological Science 36:1576–1581.
- Hiscock, P, Turq, A., Faivre, J-P. and Bourguignon, L. (2009) "Quina procurement and tool production". pp. 232–246 in. B. Adams and B.S. Blades (eds) Lithic Materials and Paleolithic Societies Wiley-Blackwell
- Hiscock, P. (2009) "Reduction, recycling and raw material Procurement in Western Arnhem Land". pp. 78–94 in. B. Adams and B.S. Blades (eds) Lithic Materials and Paleolithic Societies Wiley-Blackwell
- Hiscock, P. and Clarkson, C. (2008) "The construction of morphological diversity: a study of Mousterian implement retouching at Combe Grenal". pp. 106–135 in. W. Andrefsky (ed.) Lithic Technology Cambridge University Press.
- Mercieca, A. and Hiscock, P. (2008) "Experimental insights into alternative strategies of lithic heat treatment". Journal of Archaeological Science 35:2634–2639.
- Hiscock, P. and Clarkson, C. (2007) "Retouched notches at Combe Grenal (France) and the Reduction Hypothesis". American Antiquity 72: 176–190.
- Hiscock, P. (2007) "Looking the other way. A materialist/technological approach to classifying tools and implements, cores and retouched flakes". In S. McPherron (ed.) Tools versus Cores? Alternative approaches to Stone Tool Analysis. Cambridge Scholars Publishing. pp. 198–222.
- Hiscock, P. (2007) "Australian point and core reduction viewed through refitting". In M. de Bie and U.Schurman (eds) Fitting Rocks. Lithic refitting examined. British Archaeological Reports. International Monograph Series 1596. Oxford: Archaeopress. pp. 105–118.
- Hiscock, P. (2006) "Blunt and to the Point: Changing technological strategies in Holocene Australia". pp. 69–95 in I. Lilley (ed.) Archaeology in Oceania: Australia and the Pacific Islands. Blackwell.
- Hiscock, P. (2006) "Process or planning?: depicting and understanding the variability in Australian core reduction". In S. Ulm (eds) An archaeological life: papers in honour of Jay Hall. University of Queensland. pp. 99–108.
- Hiscock, P. and Faulkner, P. (2006) "Dating the dreaming? Creation of myths and rituals for mounds along the northern Australian coastline". Cambridge Archaeological Journal 16:209–22.
- Hiscock, P. and O’Connor, S. (2006) "An Australian perspective on modern behaviour and artefact assemblages", Before Farming, online version 2006/1 article 5.
- Hiscock, P. and Clarkson, C. (2005) "Experimental evaluation of Kuhn's Geometric Index of Reduction and the flat-flake problem". Journal of Archaeological Science 32:1015–1022.
- Hiscock, P. and Attenbrow, V. (2005) "Reduction continuums and tool use". In Clarkson, C. and L. Lamb (eds) Rocking the Boat: Recent Australian Approaches to Lithic Reduction, Use and Classification. British Archaeological Reports. International Monograph Series 1408. Oxford: Archaeopress.
- Hiscock, P. and Clarkson, C. (2005) "Measuring artefact reduction: an examination of Kuhn's Geometric Index of Reduction". In Clarkson, C. and L. Lamb (eds) Rocking the Boat: Recent Australian Approaches to Lithic Reduction, Use and Classification. British Archaeological Reports. International Monograph Series 1408. Oxford: Archaeopress.
- Hiscock, P. (2005) "Reverse knapping in the Antipodes: The spatial implications of alternate approaches to knapping". In Xavier Terradas (editor) L'outillage lithique en contextes ethnoarchéologiques / Lithic Toolkits in Ethnoarchaeological Contexts. Acts of the XIVth UISPP Congress, University of Liège, Belgium, 2–8 September 2001, Colloque/Symposium 1.4. British Archaeological Reports. International Monograph Series, S1370. Oxford: Archaeopress. pp. 35–39.
- Bellwood, P. and Hiscock, P. (2005) "Australia and the Austronesians". In C. Scarre (editor) The human past. World prehistory and the development of human societies. Thames and Hudson. pp. 264–305.
- Hiscock, P. (2005) "Artefacts on Aru: evaluating the technological sequences". In S, O’Connor, M. Spriggs, and P. Veth (eds.) The Archaeology of the Aru Islands, Eastern Indonesia. Terra Australis 22, Australian National University, Canberra. pp. 205–234.
- Hiscock, P. and O’Connor, S. (2005) "Arid paradises or dangerous landscapes. A review of explanations for Paleolithic assemblage change in arid Australia and Africa". In P. Veth, M. Smith and P. Hiscock (eds) Desert Peoples: Archaeological perspectives. Blackwell. pp. 58–77.
- Hiscock, P. and Wallis, L. (2005) "Pleistocene settlement of deserts from an Australian perspective". In P. Veth, M. Smith and P. Hiscock (eds) Desert Peoples: archaeological perspectives. Blackwell. pp. 34–57.
- Hiscock, P. (2004) "Slippery and Billy: intention, selection and equifinality in lithic artefacts". Cambridge Archaeological Journal 14:71–77.
- Hiscock, P. and Attenbrow, V. (2003) "Early Australian implement variation: a reduction model". Journal of Archaeological Science 30: 239–249.
- Hiscock, P. (2002) "Pattern and context in the Holocene proliferation of backed artefacts in Australia". In Robert G. Elston and Steven L. Kuhn (eds) Thinking Small: Global Perspectives on Microlithization. Archeological Papers of the American Anthropological Association (AP3A) number 12. pp. 163–177.
- Hiscock, P. (2002) "Quantifying the size of artefact assemblages". Journal of Archaeological Science 29:251–258.
- Hiscock, P. (2001) "Sizing up prehistory: sample size and composition of artefact assemblages". Australian Aboriginal Studies 2001/1:48–62.
- Hiscock, P. and Attenbrow, V. (1998) "Early Holocene Backed Artefacts from Australia". Archaeology in Oceania 33:49–63.
- Hiscock, P. (1996) "Transformations of Upper Palaeolithic implements in the Dabba industry from Haua Fteah (Libya)". Antiquity 70:657–664.
- Hiscock, P. (1996) "The New Age of alternative archaeology of Australia". Archaeology in Oceania 31:152–164.
- Hiscock, P. (1996) "Mobility and technology in the Kakadu coastal wetlands". Bulletin of the Indo-Pacific Prehistory Association 15:151–157.
- Hiscock, P. (1994) "Technological responses to risk in Holocene Australia". Journal of World Prehistory 8:267–292.
- Hiscock, P. (1993). "Bondaian technology in the Hunter Valley, New South Wales." Archaeology in Oceania 28(2): 65–76.
- Hiscock, P. and P. Veth (1991). "Change in the Australian Desert Culture: A Reanalysis of Tulas from Puntutjarpa Rockshelter." World Archaeology 22(3): 332–345.
- Hiscock, P. (1986). "Technological change in the Hunter River valley and the interpretation of Late Holocene change in Australia." Archaeology in Oceania 21(1): 40–50.
- Hiscock, P. (1984). "A preliminary report on the stone artefacts from Colless Creek Cave, northwest Queensland." Queensland Archaeological Research 1: 120–151.
- Hiscock, P. (1983). "Stone tools as cultural markers? The last two decades of stone artefact analysis in Australian archaeology." Australian Archaeology 16: 48–56.
