= Glenn Summerhayes =

Archaeologist and researcher at the University of Otago

Glenn Summerhayes OAM
- Born: 1954; Redfern
- Awards: Medal of the Order of Australia, Fellow of the Society of Antiquaries, Fellow of the Australian Academy of the Humanities, Fellow of the Linnean Society of London

Academic background
- Education: University of Sydney, Bachelor of Arts
- Theses: Aspects of Melanesian ceramics (MA thesis, 1987); Interaction in Pacific prehistory: An approach based on the production, distribution and use of pottery (Doctoral thesis, 1996)

Academic work
- Institutions: University of Otago
- Doctoral students: Oli Wilson

Glenn Reginald Summerhayes OAM (born 1954) is an Australian-born New Zealand archaeologist, and is an Emeritus Professor at the University of Otago, specialising in the Lapita people and pottery and the settlement of the Western Pacific and Papua New Guinea.

== Early life and education ==
Summerhayes was born in Redfern, Sydney. His interest in archaeology was sparked as a child but he did not begin studying it until after he had completed a degree in history at the University of Sydney.

== Academic career ==
Summerhayes was employed full time with the Department of Veterans' Affairs while doing fieldwork and completing a Master of Arts at the University of Sydney in 1987, with a thesis on Melanesian ceramics. During the early 1990s he undertook several seasons of fieldwork in Papua New Guinea, became curator at the Museum of Victoria of the Vanuatu collection and registrar of the Victorian Archaeological Survey. In 1996 he completed his doctorate at La Trobe University, with a thesis on pottery in Pacific prehistory. His work analysing pottery collections showed that different clay tempers were used to make Lapita pottery raising questions about the movement of both pottery and people.

In 2001 he became a research fellow and later head of department at the Department of Archaeology and Natural History at Australian National University (ANU) in Canberra. In 2005 he moved to take up a professorship and Head of Department of Anthropology, Gender, and Sociology at the University of Otago.

Summerhayes's work has contributed to understanding the spread of the Lapita peoples and cultures and the length of human occupation in Papua New Guinea. Through analysis of the chemical composition and styles of Lapita pottery and obsidian Summerhayes has been able to investigate trade and exchange and the settlement of Papua New Guinea and the Western Pacific. He identified Early, Middle and Late Phases of Lapita production. Fieldwork at several sites in the Ivane Valley in Papua New Guinea followed by analysis of archaeological materials enabled him to establish that occupation occurred 49,000 to 44,000 years ago. Importantly this has contributed to understanding the movement of peoples through the Sahul continent and consequent adaptation.

In 2024 on his retirement from the University of Otago Summerhayes's colleagues and former students compiled a Festschrift in his honour. It was edited by three of his former students: Anne Ford, Ben Shaw and Dylan Gaffney.

Summerhayes is also a Fellow of several learned societies: the Linnean Society, Royal Anthropological Institute of Great Britain and Ireland, the Australian Academy of the Humanities and the Society of Antiquaries. He is an honorary professor at the University of Queensland and at ANU, and honorary curator of archaeology and Pacific collections at the Otago Museum.

== Honours and awards ==
In 2014 Summerhayes was appointed an Officer of the Order of Logohu. He won the Percy Smith Medal for Research Publications in Anthropology at the University of Otago in 2015, and the best paper prize at the Australian Archaeological Association in 2013.

In the 2021 Queen's Birthday Honours List Summerhayes was awarded the Medal of the Order of Australia, for service to tertiary education, and to history.

== Selected works ==
A full bibliography of Summerhayes's publications can be found in the Introduction of the Festschrift.

- Summerhayes, Glenn Reginald; Matthew Leavesley; Fairbairn, Andrew; Herman Mandui; Field, Judith H.; Anne Ford; Fullagar, Richard (2010). "Human adaptation and plant use in highland New Guinea 49,000 to 44,000 years ago". Science. 330 (6000): 78–81. doi:10.1126/science.1193130. PMID 20929808. Wikidata Q47259238.
- David Frankel; Jennifer M. Webb; R. Adams; P. Croft; D. Simmons; M.A Smith; Summerhayes, Glenn Reginald; C. Xenophontos; Mike Smith (1996). "Marki Alonia : An Early and Middle Bronze Age Town in Cyprus - Excavations 1990-1994". Australian Archaeology. 43 (1): 58–58. doi:10.1080/03122417.1996.12094425. Wikidata Q112210163.
- Summerhayes, Glenn Reginald; J. R. Bird; R. Fullagar; C. Gosden; J. Specht; R. Torrence (1998). "Application of PIXE-PIGME to Archaeological Analysis of Changing Patterns of Obsidian Use in West New Britain, Papua New Guinea". Archaeological Obsidian Studies: Method and Theory. pp. 129–158. doi:10.1007/978-1-4757-9276-8_6. Wikidata Q138783633.
- Summerhayes, Glenn Reginald; Jim Allen (1993). "The Transport of Mopir Obsidian to Late Pleistocene New Ireland". Archaeology in Oceania. 28 (3). JSTOR 40386972. Wikidata Q138783635.
- Mike T. Carson; Hsiao-chun Hung; Summerhayes, Glenn Reginald; Bellwood, Peter (2013). "The Pottery Trail From Southeast Asia to Remote Oceania". Journal of Island and Coastal Archaeology. 8 (1): 17–36. doi:10.1080/15564894.2012.726941. Wikidata Q112301176.
- Summerhayes, Glenn Reginald (2009). "Obsidian Network Patterns in Melanesia - Sources, Characterisation and Distribution". Bulletin of the Indo-Pacific Prehistory Association. 29: 109–123. doi:10.7152/bippa.v29i0.9484. hdl:1885/51572. Wikidata Q138783648.
- Ben J. Shaw; Summerhayes, Glenn Reginald; Buckley, Hallie; Joel A. Baker (2009). "The use of strontium isotopes as an indicator of migration in human and pig Lapita populations in the Bismarck Archipelago, Papua New Guinea". Journal of Archaeological Science. 36 (4): 1079–1091. doi:10.1016/j.jas.2008.12.010. Wikidata Q99917596.
- Summerhayes, Glenn (2000). Lapita interaction. Terra Australis. Canberra: Australian Nat. Univ. ISBN 978-0-7315-4623-7.
