= Billy Griffiths (writer) =

Australian historian and writer

- Education: University of Sydney
- Occupations: Historian, writer
- Writing career
- Genres: Non-fiction, essays
- Subjects: History, archaeology
- Notable work: Deep Time Dreaming: Uncovering Ancient Australia
- Notable awards: 2019 Book of the Year, NSW Premier's Literary Awards; 2018 John Mulvaney Book Award

Billy Griffiths, also known as William Griffiths, is an Australian historian and writer, known for his book Deep Time Dreaming: Uncovering Ancient Australia (2018). As of April 2020, he is a lecturer at Deakin University in Victoria, and Associate Investigator, ARC Centre of Excellence for Australian Biodiversity and Heritage. Griffiths won the Ernest Scott Prize in 2019.

== Education ==
Griffiths earned his Honours degree at the University of Sydney in 2011, basing his thesis on Gough Whitlam and Australia-China relations. His father is Tom Griffiths, the W K Hancock Professor of History at the Australian National University.

In 2017 he earned his PhD at the University of Sydney, and was congratulated "on what his examiners agreed was a stunning PhD thesis". One examiner commented "Griffiths brilliantly charts the history of modern Aboriginal archaeology in Australia, and how the continent’s astonishing deep time history was discovered", and suggests that this could be "a landmark book".

Griffiths was a research fellow at Deakin University from 2017 to 2019.

== Career ==
He wrote The China Breakthrough: Whitlam in the Middle Kingdom, 1971 in 2012, based on the work he had done for his Honours thesis.

In the same year, he worked as the camp manager and cook for the team working on re-excavating Madjedbebe (formerly known as Malakunanja II), a sandstone rock shelter in Arnhem Land, in the Northern Territory, said to be the site of the oldest evidence of human habitation in the country. He said that he had always been interested in the deeper history of Australia, before the arrival of Captain Cook, learn more about archaeology, and to work with a "different type of archive", such as fossils and artefacts, whose stories are "bereft of intention" because they do not have an interpreter writing the story, as documents do. At the dig, he met traditional owners, the Mirrar people, who have a deep connection to the site. Upon returning from this expedition, he had so many things that he wanted to write about, which he sees as a way to process his thoughts: "I find writing hard; but not-writing is even harder". He wrote an article, "A world in a grain of sand: the Malakunanja II diaries", based on his experiences at the dig, in which he expanded on the theme of the "storied landscape" of Aboriginal history made evident by the site. In 2015, he again spent time as cook at the dig.

He co-edited The Archaeologist’s Book of Quotations, published in 2015, with archaeologist Mike Smith of The Australian (also emeritus research fellow at the National Museum of Australia).

In 2018, Griffiths published Deep Time Dreaming: Uncovering Ancient Australia, which, according to the publisher's blurb, "investigates a twin revolution: the reassertion of Aboriginal identity in the second half of the twentieth century, and the uncovering of the traces of ancient Australia". Described by one reviewer as a "readable, journalistic book about the history of Australian archaeology", the book won several awards and was nominated for several others (see below).

As of April 2020, he is a lecturer in Cultural Heritage and Museum Studies at Deakin University, and Associate Investigator at the ARC Centre of Excellence for Australian Biodiversity and Heritage. He is also a member of the Alfred Deakin Institute for Citizenship and Globalisation. His research centres on cultural heritage, Indigenous history, political history, archaeology and seascapes.

== Works ==
=== Deep Time Dreaming ===
Deep Time Dreaming: Uncovering Ancient Australia (2018) is the work which has garnered national and international attention, numerous awards and excellent reviews. In it, Griffiths uses the concept of deep time "to deepen our understanding of the history of this continent", with the book bringing together the work of archaeologists, geomorphologists and others whose work has illuminated the significance of different places that they have examined.

In it, he describes the development of modern archaeology in Australia over about 60 years, including its involvement with Aboriginal political struggle. Archaeology has contributed to a different understanding of Australian history and landscape. The book highlights the work of Australian archaeologists and others, such as Vere Gordon Childe, John Mulvaney, Rhys Jones, Isabel McBryde, Betty Meehan, Harry Lourandos, Jim Bowler, Lesley Maynard, Sylvia Hallam and Carmel Schire, and the role of both archaeologists and Aboriginal leaders in establishing heritage legislation to protect places of cultural and natural significance, often meeting resistance. According to the Australian Archaeological Association, the book helps to "introduce archaeological ideas, debates and methodologies to non-specialist audiences and to build bridges between the disciplines of history and archaeology, as John Mulvaney did throughout his life".

The book also talks about the need of white Australians to learn of and come to terms with the magnitude of the dispossession of Aboriginal peoples of Australia, to help understand the need for Aboriginal reconciliation.

The work met with many favourable reviews by authors, in publications such as The Monthly, The Sydney Morning Herald and Overland literary journal.

Deep Time Dreaming was both co-winner of the Douglas Stewart Prize for Non-Fiction and outright winner of Book of the Year in the New South Wales Premier's Literary Awards, in the same year. It won the 2018 Ernest Scott Prize and the 2019 John Mulvaney Book Award, as well as the US Felicia A. Holton Book Award for 2020. It was also shortlisted for the Prime Minister's Prize for Australian History in 2019.

=== Other books ===
- Griffiths, Billy (November 2012). The China Breakthrough: Whitlam in the Middle Kingdom, 1971. Monash University Publishing. ISBN 978-1-921867-64-4.
- Smith, Mike; Griffiths, Billy, eds. (October 2015). The Australian Archaeologist's Book of Quotations. Monash University. ISBN 978-1-922235-74-9.

=== Articles ===
- Griffiths, Billy (2013). "A world in a grain of sand: the Malakunanja II diaries". Griffith Review. 41: 162–177. hdl:10536/DRO/DU:30100532. ISSN 1839-2954.
- Griffiths, Billy (2017). "'The Dawn' of Australian Archaeology: John Mulvaney at Fromm's Landing". Journal of Pacific Archaeology. 8 (1): 100–111. doi:10.70460/jpa.v8i1.217. hdl:10536/DRO/DU:30100522.
- Griffiths, William (2017). "Caring for country: the place where the dreaming changed shape". Griffith Review: 232–245. hdl:10536/DRO/DU:30100543. ISBN 9781925498356.
- Griffiths, Billy; Russell, Lynette (2018). "What we were told: Responses to 65,000 years of Aboriginal history". Aboriginal History. 42: 31–53. doi:10.22459/ah.42.2018.02. hdl:10536/DRO/DU:30129014. (Open access)

== Awards ==
For Deep Time Dreaming:

- Winner, 2020 Felicia A. Holton Book Award
- Winner, 2019 Ernest Scott Prize
- Winner, 2019 Book of the Year, NSW Premier's Literary Awards
- Winner, 2019 Douglas Stewart Prize for Non-Fiction, NSW Premier's Literary Awards
- Winner, 2018 John Mulvaney Book Award
- Highly Commended, 2019 Victorian Premier's Literary Awards
- Shortlisted, 2018 Queensland Literary Awards
- Shortlisted, 2019 Prime Minister's Literary Awards
- Shortlisted, 2019 Educational Publishing Awards (Annual prize organised by the Australian Publishers Association.)
- Longlisted, 2019 Australian Book Industry Awards
- Longlisted, 2019 CHASS Australia Book Prize (Annual prize awarded by the Council for the Humanities, Arts and Social Sciences)
