= Jane Balme =

Professor of archaeology

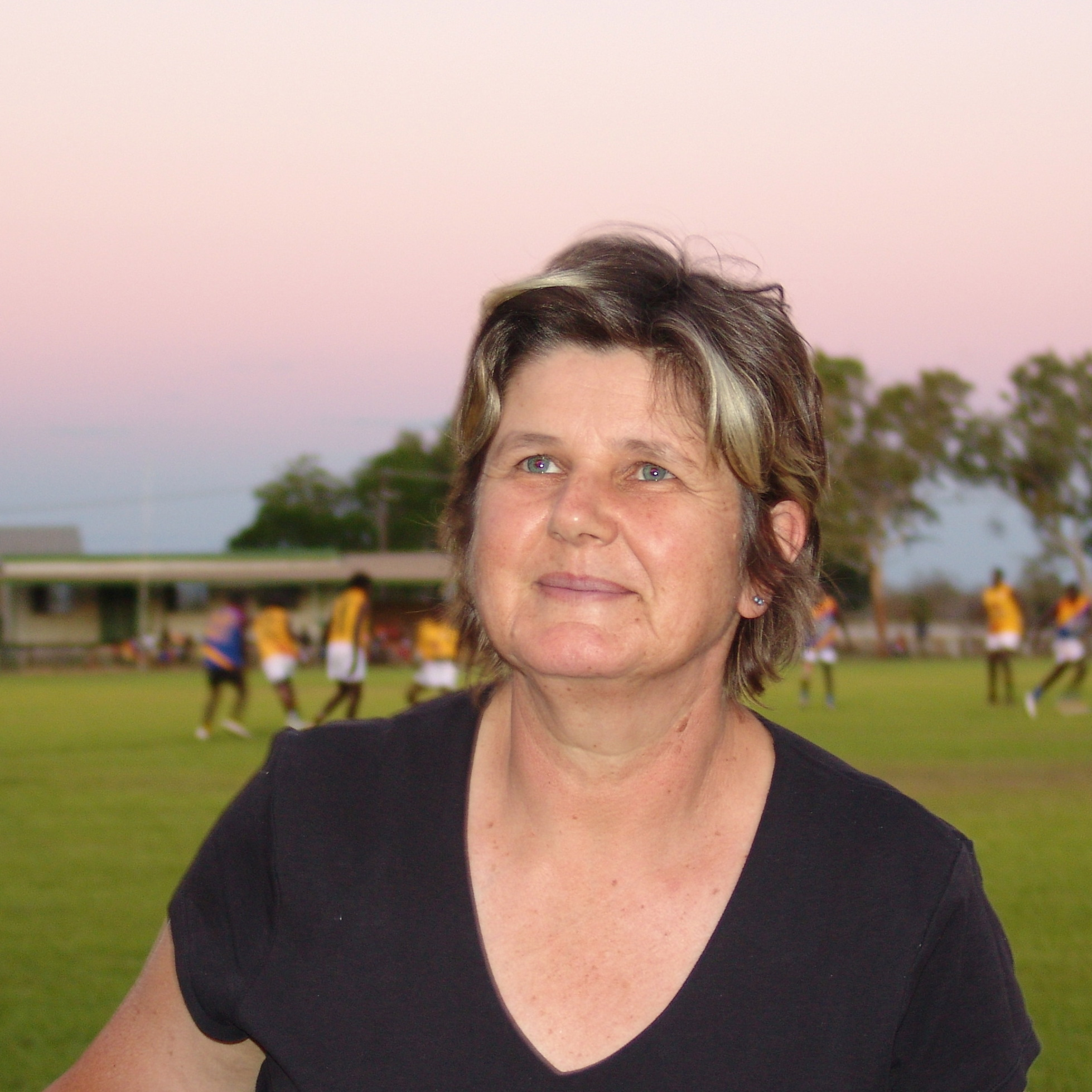
- Balme in 2005
- Born: c. 1960 (age c. 65)
- Education: University of Western Australia; Australian National University (PhD)
- Occupation: Archaeologist
- Employer: University of Western Australia
- Title: Professor

Jane Balme FAHA (born c. 1960) is a Professor of Archaeology at the University of Western Australia. She is an expert on early Indigenous groups and Australian archaeology.

== Biography ==
Balme studied for an undergraduate degree in Anthropology at the University of Western Australia, graduating in 1979. Balme worked on cave sites in south west Australia for the Western Australian Museum and became interested in archaeology.

Balme completed her PhD at the Australian National University in 1990.

Her research focuses on early Indigenous groups in Australia, gendered social organisation, and the discipline of archaeology.

Balme has authored a wide range of journal articles, a textbook Archaeology in Practice: A Student Guide to Archaeological Analyses with Alistair Paterson, and the edited volumes Gendered Archaeology with Wendy Beck, and More Unconsidered Trifles : Papers to Celebrate the Career of Sandra Bowdler. A review of Archaeology in Practice states that "It is rare that a book is written as a text book but also provides an important contribution to the discipline and this volume deserves this dual recognition."

Balme has been strongly involved with the Australian Archaeological Association, serving as secretary and chair of the Australian National Committee for Archaeology Teaching and Learning.

In November 2018. Balme was elected Fellow of the Australian Academy of the Humanities.

As of 2020 Balme, working alongside Sue O'Connor, is researching Rock art in Australia with a particular focus on carvings (also called dendroglyphs) on Boab trees in the Kimberley Region and in the Tanami Desert. In this study the pair discuss the history of research into this trees as well as present a recent survey; in the Kimberley they worked closely with Nyigina and Mangala traditional owners. Their results provide insight into the archaeological and anthropological significance of these carvings.

== Selected publications ==
- K. Frederick, U., Balme, J., Jamieson, J. et al. Embedded in the Bark: Kimberley Boab Trees as Sites of Historical Archaeology. Int J Histor Archaeol 27, 817–840 (2023). https://doi.org/10.1007/s10761-022-00678-z
- O'Connor, S., Balme, J., Frederick, U., Garstone, B., Bedford, R., Bedford, J., . . . Lewis, D. (2022). Art in the bark: Indigenous carved boab trees (Adansonia gregorii) in north-west Australia. Antiquity, 96 (390), 1574-1591. doi:10.15184/aqy.2022.129
- Balme, J., O’Connor, S. & Fallon, S. 2018. New dates on dingo bones from Madura Cave provide oldest firm evidence for arrival of the species in Australia. Scientific Reports. 8, 1, 9933
- Balme, J. and O'Connor, S. 2016. Dingoes and Aboriginal social organisation in Holocene Australia. Journal of Archaeological Science: Reports 7: 775–781.
- Balme, J. and O'Connor, S. 2015. A 'port scene', identity and rock art of the inland Southern Kimberley, Western Australia. Rock Art Research 32 (1): 75–83.
- Balme, J. and Paterson, A. 2014. Archaeology in Practice.
- Balme, J. 2013. Of boats and string: the maritime colonisation of Australia. Quaternary International 285: 68–75.
- Bowdler, S. and Balme, J. 2010. Gatherers and grannies: further thoughts on the origins of gender. Australian Feminist Studies 25: 391–405.
- Balme, J., Davidson, I., Mcdonald, J., Stern, N., Veth, P. Symbolic behaviour and the peopling of the southern arc route to Australia. Quaternary International 202 (1/2): 59–68.
- Balme, J. and Bulbeck, C. Engendering Origins : Theories of Gender in Sociology and Archaeology. Australian Archaeology 67: 3–11.
- Balme, J., O'Connor, S., Ulm, S., Ross, A. 2008. More Unconsidered Trifles: Papers to Celebrate the Career of Sandra Bowdler. Australian Archaeological Association Inc.
- Balme, J. & Beck, W. 2002. Starch and Charcoal: Useful Measures of Activity Areas in Archaeological Rockshelters. Journal of Archaeological Science 29 (2): 157–166.
- Balme, J. & Toussaint, S. 1999. 'I reckon they should keep that hut': reflections on Aboriginal tracking in the Kimberley. Australian Aboriginal Studies 1: 26–32.
- Balme, J. & Beck, W. 1996. Earth mounds in southeastern Australia. Australian Archaeology 42: 39–51.
