= Wendy Beck =

Australian academic

- Occupation: Archaeologist

Wendy Beck is an Adjunct Associate Professor at the University of New England in archaeology and cultural heritage.

== Biography ==
Beck grew up in Melbourne. She graduated from the University of Melbourne with a BSc in microbiology and biochemistry in 1979. Beck turned her attentions to archaeology after attending the Victorian Archaeological Survey Summer School in 1978–1979 and received a PhD from La Trobe University in 1986 on the subject of Technology, Toxicity and Subsistence: A Study of Australian Aboriginal Plant Food Processing. During her postgraduate research, Beck conducted fieldwork in Arnhem Land, and was a postdoctoral Fellow at the Australian National University working on a bush food dietary project in 1985. Beck was appointed a lecturer at the University of New England in 1986, within the Department of Archaeology and Palaeoanthropology.

A major area of research of Beck has been on plants and gender archaeology, drawing on archaeological fieldwork, ethnographic study, and archaeological science. Beck co-edited the first book to deal with archaeobotanical studies in Sahul, Plants in Australian Archaeology, with Anne Clarke and Lesley Head. Her significant contributions to archaeology are the study of plants and gender in archaeology, place studies, work on archaeology and Higher Education, and service to the archaeological profession. Beck served as president of the Australian Archaeological Association from 1989 to 1990.

Beck has received multiple Australian Research Council grants, a Carrick Grant, Environment Trust NSW Grant and a Partnership Industry Research Grant.

Beck has edited books including Gendered Archaeology with Jane Balme, and Plants in Australian Archaeology. Plants in Australian Archaeology has been described as having accomplished "a great deal" in bringing the study of plants in Australian archaeology to the fore.

== Selected publications ==
- 2023 Beck, W. Clarke, C. and Haworth, R., Community Archaeology: Working Ancient Aboriginal Wetlands in Eastern Australia. Archaeopress Access Archaeology.
- 2020 Sheridan, A., O’Sullivan, J., Fisher, J., Dunne, K. and Beck, W., Responding to institutional climate change in higher education: the evolution of a writing group to group peer mentoring. Gender and Education, 32(7), pp. 891–907.
- 2019 Sheridan, A., O'Sullivan, J., Fisher, J., Dunne, K. and Beck, W., Escaping from the City Means More than a Cheap House and a 10-Minute Commute. M/C Journal, 22(3) (electronic).
- 2015 Beck, W. Haworth, R. and Appleton, J. Aboriginal resources change through time in New England upland wetlands, south-east Australia. Archaeology in Oceania. Vol. 50 Supplement: 46–56.
- 2008 Beck, W. Dunne, K, Fisher, J, O'Sullivan, J, Sheridan, A. Turning Up The Heat: Collaboration As A Response To A Chilly Research Environment TEXT 12 (2) (electronic)
- 2008 Beck, W. and Clarke, C. Archaeology Teaching and Learning in Australia 2003–2008 Perspectives from the Academy. Research in Archaeological Education Journal 1
- 2006 Beck, W. 'Chapter 8: Aboriginal archaeology'. In Atkinson, A. Ryan, J., Davidson I, and Piper, A (eds) High Lean Country. Land, people and memory in New England. Allen and Unwin pp. 88–97.
- 2006 Beck, W. Chapter 10: The analysis of plant macroremains. In Balme, J.and Paterson, A., Archaeology in Practice: A student's guide to archaeological analysis. Blackwell, Oxford pp. 296–315.
- 2006 Beck, W. & Torrence, R. Starch Pathways in Torrence, R. and Barton, H (eds) Ancient Starch, Left Coast Press, Walnut Creek, California, USA. pp. 53–75
- 2006 Beck, W. Narratives of world heritage in travel guidebooks. International Journal of Heritage Studies 12 (6): 521–535.
- 2006 Beck, W., Dunne, K., Fisher, J., O'Sullivan, J. & Sheridan, A. A Capella and Diva: A Collaborative Process for Individual Academic Writing. M/C Journal, 9, (2).
- Balme, J. & W. Beck. 2002. Starch and charcoal: useful measures of activity areas in archaeological rockshelters. Journal of Archaeological Science 29: 157–66.
- Beck, W. & M. Somerville. 2002. Embodied places in Indigenous ecotourism: the Yarrawarra project. Australian Aboriginal Studies 2002(2): 4–13.
- Balme, J. & W. Beck. (ed.) 1995. Gendered archaeology (Occasional Papers in Prehistory series). Canberra: Department of Archaeology and Natural History, Australian National University.
- Beck, W. 1994. Women in archaeology: Australia and the United States, in P. Nelson, S. Nelson & A. Wylie (ed.) Equity issues for women in archaeology (Archaeological Papers of the American Anthropology Association 5): 99–104. *Washington (DC): American Anthropological Association.
- Beck, W. & J. Balme. 1994. Gender in Aboriginal archaeology: recent research. Australian Archaeology 39: 39–46.
- Beck, W. 1992. Aboriginal preparation of Cycas seeds in Australia. Economic Botany 46: 133–47.
- Beck, W. & L. Head. 1990. Women in Australian prehistory. Australian Feminist Studies 11: 29–48.
- Beck, W., A. Clarke & L. Head. (ed.) 1989 Plants in Australian archaeology (Tempus series 1). Brisbane: University of Queensland Anthropology Museum
