= Mary Dallas =

Australian archaeologist

Mary Dallas (1952–2023) was a Scottish-born Australian archaeologist, who specialised in the area of Aboriginal cultural heritage management.

Dallas was prominent in the area cultural heritage assessment procedures including Review of Environmental Factors, for Local and Regional Environmental Plans and Local Environmental Studies, Aboriginal Heritage Impact Assessments and Conservation Management Plans. She also had considerable experience in legal matters related to assessment of the impact of development on heritage protection.

She has completed important Aboriginal heritage assessments for the municipalities of Parramatta, and Blacktown and for the Royal National Park Sydney.

She completed a Bachelor of Arts with Honours in Archaeology and Fine Arts at the University of Sydney in 1973. She was a founding and past president of the Australian Association of Consulting Archaeologists, a member of the Australian Rock Art Research Association, member of Australasian Society for Historical Archaeology, and one of, if not the first consultants to work in NSW. She was active in setting professional standards for archaeology. Along with Helen Brayshaw, Laila Haglund, Jo McDonald and Val Attenbrow, she was among the first archaeologists in Australia to make their living purely from consulting.

Dallas died at her home in Kangaroo Valley, NSW.
