= Betty Meehan =

Australian archaeologist

Betty Meehan FAHA
- Born: Betty Francis Meehan; 1933 (age 92–93); Bourke, New South Wales, Australia
- Occupations: Archaeologist, anthropologist
- Years active: 1958–2000s
- Known for: Work with Arnhem Land peoples

Betty Francis Meehan FAHA (born 1933) is an Australian archaeologist and anthropologist who has worked extensively with Aboriginal people in Arnhem Land, Northern Territory.

== Early life and education ==
Meehan was born and grew up in Bourke, New South Wales, Australia, in 1933. She was the elder daughter of Francis Owen and Olive Jane Meehan. She attended high school in Bourke and trained as a specialist infants' teacher at Bathurst Teachers College, teaching in Bourke, Darwin, Sydney, and Canberra. Meehan travelled with her first husband, Lester Hiatt, to the remote Northern Territory town of Maningrida, in East Arnhem Land, arriving in 1958 on a pearling lugger to find the Aboriginal community had set up camp on the beach and sent out a dugout canoe to bring them ashore. There she set up the first school for Aboriginal children at Maningrida, returning in the 1970s to undertake her PhD fieldwork with her second husband, Rhys Jones. In 1977, Meehan visited North Arnhem Land to observe the Anbarra people's daily behaviour living on the coast.

She studied anthropology at the University of Sydney from 1962, obtaining an MA in anthropology and a PhD at the Department of Prehistory and Anthropology of the Australian National University.

== Career and recognition ==
Meehan was president of the Australian Archaeological Association in 1984 and editor of Australian Archaeology from 1987-1994.

She focused her research on the subsistence regimes of an Arnhem Land Aboriginal community. In 2007 she co-authored an article about this region and the confluence of human culture and the environment.

She was made an Honorary Associate of the Peabody Museum of Archaeology and Ethnology at Harvard University (1995-1996), was director of the Aboriginal and Torres Strait Islander Environment Section of the Australian Heritage Commission from 1991 to 1995, head of the Aboriginal Section National Museum of Australia (1990-1991), and a Fellow of the Australian Academy of the Humanities (1987).

Her work is described and lauded in Billy Griffiths' 2018 award-winning book Deep Time Dreaming: Uncovering Ancient Australia.
