= Glynis Jones =

Glynis Jones may refer to:

- Glynis Jones (composer), British composer
- Glynis Jones (archaeologist), British archaeologist

== See also ==
- Glynis Johns (1923–2024), British actress, dancer, musician and singer
