= Amy Bogaard =

Canadian archaeologist

Amy Bogaard FBA

Academic background
- Education: University of Sheffield (PhD)
- Thesis: The Permanence, Intensity and Seasonality of Early Crop Cultivation in Western-Central Europe (2002)
- Doctoral advisor: Glynis Jones

Academic work
- Institutions: University of Oxford
- Notable works: Neolithic Farming in Central Europe

Amy Bogaard FBA is a Canadian archaeologist and Professor of Neolithic and Bronze Age Archaeology at the University of Oxford.

== Education ==
Bogaard earned a PhD from the University of Sheffield in 2002, supervised by Glynis Jones.

== Career ==
Bogaard was appointed Lecturer of Neolithic and Bronze Age Archaeology at the School of Archaeology, University of Oxford. She was awarded the Shanghai Archaeology Forum Research Award in 2015. She currently is a stipendiary lecturer at St Peter's College, and an external professor at the Santa Fe Institute.

Recent work has investigated the relationship between agricultural practices and inequality.

In 2013, Bogaard was awarded an ERC starter grant for the project The Agricultural Origins of Urban Civilization. In 2018, Bogaard was part of a team to win an ERC Synergy grant for the project Exploring the Dynamics and Causes of Prehistoric Land Use Change in the Cradle of European Farming. She is a member of the ERC-funded FEEDSAX Project.

Bogaard was elected as a Fellow of the British Academy in 2020, and is a member of the Antiquity Trust, which supports the publication of the archaeology journal Antiquity.

== Selected publications ==
=== Books ===
- Neolithic Farming in Central Europe (2004). London: Routledge.
- Plant Use and Crop Husbandry in an Early Neolithic Village (2011): Vaihingen an der Enz, Baden-Württemberg. Frankfurter Archäologische Schriften. Bonn: Habelt-Verlag.

=== Journal articles ===
- Bogaard, A. 2005. Garden agriculture’and the nature of early farming in Europe and the Near East. World Archaeology 37.2: 177-196.
- Bogaard, A. et al 2007. "The impact of manuring on nitrogen isotope ratios in cereals: archaeological implications for reconstruction of diet and crop management practices." Journal of Archaeological Science 34.3: 335-343.
- Bogaard, A. et al 2013. Crop manuring and intensive land management by Europe’s first farmers. Proceedings of the National Academy of Sciences, 110(31), 12589-12594.
