= Mike Smith (archaeologist) =

Australian archaeologist (1955–2022)

Mike Smith (1955 – 16 October 2022) was an Australian archaeologist, scholar, historian, researcher, and author. He was instrumental in the development of Central Australian archaeological research, in particular establishing the antiquity of Aboriginal presence in the inland desert 35,000 years ago.

== Early life and education ==
Mike Smith was born in 1955 in Blackpool, England, and came to Australia at age six in 1961. His father worked as an electrician spending some months in Ceduna, South Australia where young Mike developed his interest in arid outback Australia.

At age 15, having written to the South Australian Museum about reptiles, he was invited to join museum excavations at Roonka on the lower Murray and Koonalda Cave in the Nullarbor, on which Alexander Gallus also worked. On these he met archaeologist Rhys Jones, who inspired him to study archaeology. In 1973 he enrolled at the Australian National University studying archaeology with John Mulvaney.

Smith obtained his Bachelor of Arts (First Class Honours) in 1977 and Master of Arts in 1980, both at the Australian National University (ANU). His MA thesis was on Saltbush, sampling strategy and settlement pattern: A systematic archaeological survey of Plumbago Station Historic Reserve, South Australia.

He obtained his Doctor of Philosophy at the University of New England (Armidale, NSW) in 1988 with his PhD thesis "The Pattern and Timing of Prehistoric Settlement in Central Australia".

== Career ==
Smith was instrumental in the development of Central Australian archaeological research, especially establishing the antiquity of Aboriginal presence in the inland desert 35,000 years ago.

His career has included:

- Field archaeologist, Museum and Art Gallery of the Northern Territory, Darwin and Alice Springs
- Research fellow, Research School of Pacific and Asian Studies, Australian National University (ANU)
- Lecturer in archaeology, Department of Archaeology and Anthropology, ANU
- Senior curator and director of research and development, National Museum of Australia (NMA)

In 1996 Smith was appointed head of the People and Environment section at NMA, and later became Director of Research and Development. He contributed to exhibition's collections, educational materials, public programs, archival development, publications, research, and online content. During his time there, he established the Research Centre as well as the scholarly journal reCollections, and in 2004 developed Extremes: Survival in the Great Deserts of the Southern Hemisphere exhibition.

Much of his research revolved around the Puritjarra rock shelter.

He was assisted in his work in central Australia by Aboriginal Australian artist and community leader Wenten Rubuntja.

== Recognition and awards ==
His major work, The Archaeology of Australia's Deserts (2013), was praised as a landmark in Australian history.

He was a Fellow of the Society of Antiquaries of London and Fellow of the Australian Academy of the Humanities.

Other awards and honours include:

- 2006: Rhys Jones Medal for outstanding and sustained contribution
- 2010: Verco Medal, Royal Society of South Australia
- 2013: Member of the Order of Australia, for significant service to archaeological scholarship in Australian desert regions
- 2013: Symposium celebrating 30 years of Smith's work, at the NMA
- 2014: Museum Director's Award for Excellence

== Personal life ==
Smith was married and had two children.

He died on 16 October 2022.
