= Ysola Best =

Australian author and Yugambeh elder (1940–2007)

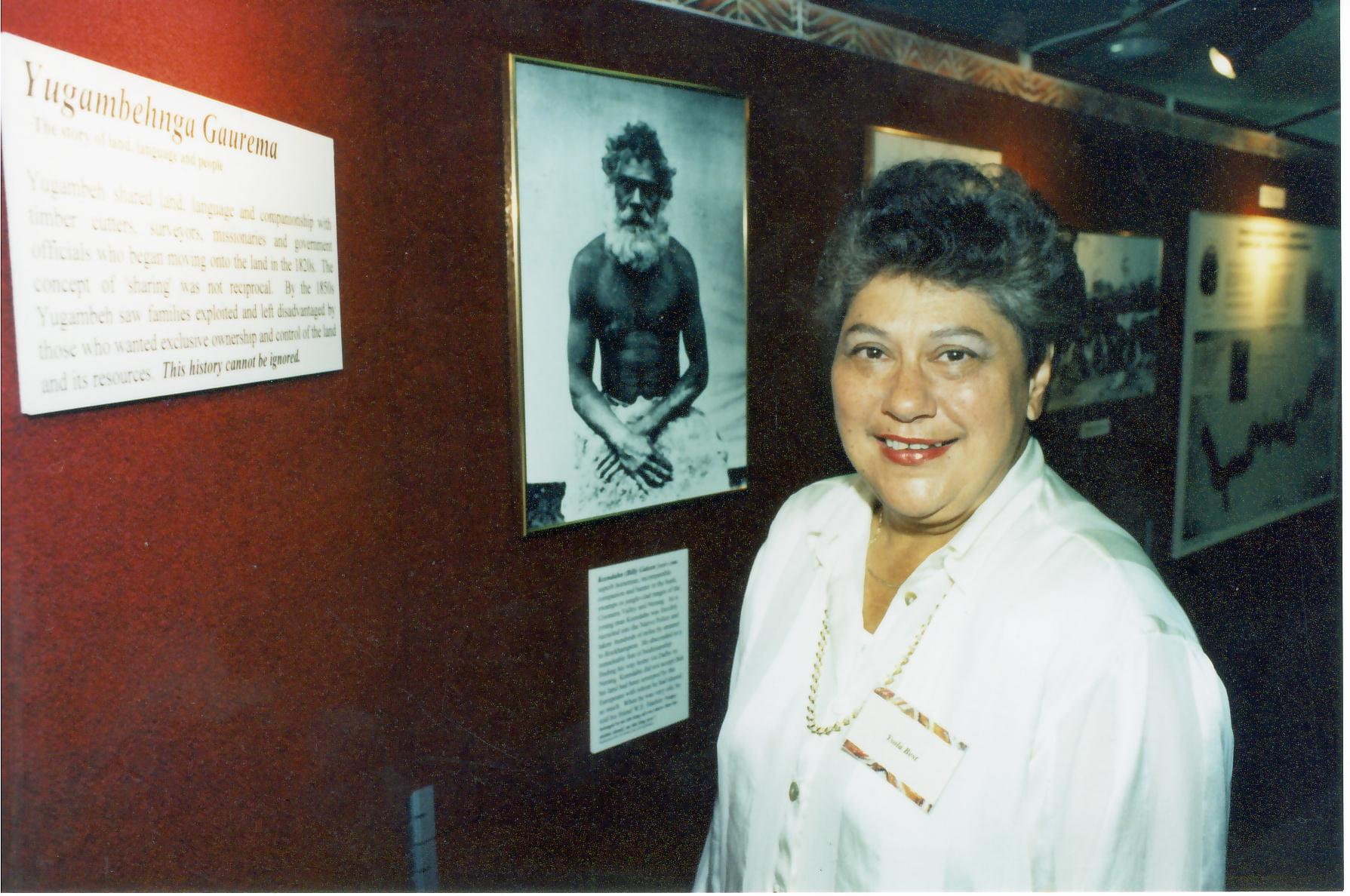
- Born: Ysola Mary Best; 15 November 1940; Beaudesert, Queensland, Australia
- Died: 19 May 2007 (aged 66)
- Occupations: Aboriginal elder and author
- Known for: Researching and preserving the language, history and culture of the Yugambeh people

Ysola Mary Best (15 November 1940 – 19 May 2007) was an Australian author and elder of the Yugambeh people. Best is known for her works and role in preserving the language, history and culture of the Yugambeh. She wrote about Aboriginal culture and history. Most of her published works are about the Yugambeh language group of South East Queensland.

== Early life and education ==
Born on 15 November 1940, Best was the youngest child of Edith Graham and Stanley Yuke. Her grandmother Jenny Graham, was an Aboriginal elder of the Yugambeh people. Best spent her childhood in Southport in Queensland.

Best attended the Star of the Sea Convent school in Southport. She graduated from University of Adelaide in 1990 with a Bachelor of Arts in Aboriginal Studies and the following year was awarded a Graduate Diploma in Community Museum Management from James Cook University.

== Career ==
Best spent most of her life researching and writing about the Yugambeh. Along with her sister, Patricia O'Connor Best worked to preserve the Yugambeh traditions and culture. In 1985, Best and her sister Patricia O'Connor successfully lobbied the University of Queensland to repatriate the skeletal remains of their ancestors from the Broadboach burial grounds. The sisters worked towards establishing the Yugambeh Museum Language and Heritage Centre at Beenleigh which opened in 1995.

In 1997, Best and Alex Barlow published Kombumerri – Saltwater People. The book detailed the history of the Kombumerri people and also documented Best's own experiences and family history.

She also wrote articles for the Royal Historical Society of Queensland. In 1994, she gave the opening address in Beaudesert at the Royal Historical Society of Queensland conference. Her paper Aboriginal and early settler relations on the Logan and Albert Rivers: an Aboriginal view was subsequently published in the Society's journal.

In 2005, Best, along with her sister-in-law, Candace Kruger, and Patricia, wrote and published Yugambeh Taiga, which documents the music traditions of the Yugambeh people.

Best worked at the State Library of Queensland and was on the State Library of Queensland Aboriginal Advisory Committee from 1993 to 2000.

== Personal life ==
Best married Robin Best in 1962. The couple had two sons, Hague and Shannon. In 1980, Best and her husband moved to Tamborine Mountain, the traditional lands of the Wangerriburra clan of the Yugambeh people. She spent most of her later years on the Mountain, writing and researching about the history of her people.

She died of cancer on 19 May 2007 at the age of 66.

In 2011, the Kungala building at the Yugambeh Museum was dedicated to her posthumously. Some of her works are also held at the museum.

== Works ==
- Best, Ysola. (1994). An Uneasy Coexistence: An Aboriginal Perspective of "Contact History" in Southeast Queensland.
- Best, Ysola. Jebbribillum Bora Ring: Our Learning Place, appears in Rory O'Connor Yugambeh: In Defence of our Country: mibun wallul mundindehla malinah dhagun 1993. Kombumerri Aboriginal Corporation for Culture, Queensland.
- Best. Ysola Bilin Bilin – King or Eagle? in Poignant Regalia: 19th Century Aboriginal Breastplates & Images: a Catalogue of Aboriginal Breastplates Held in Public. Regional and Private Collections in New South Wales. Victoria. Tasmania. Queensland. South Australia. Western Australia and the Australian Capital Territory.
- Best, Ysola. "Aboriginal and early settler relations on the Logan and Albert Rivers: an Aboriginal view. Paper presented to Royal Historical Society of Queensland. Conference (1994: Beaudesert, Qld). Journal of the Royal Historical Society of Queensland.
- Best, Ysola (1997). Kombumerri – Saltwater people. Alex Barlow. Port Melbourne: Heinemann Library Australia. ISBN 1-86391-037-9.
- Best, Ysola (2005). Yugambeh talga: music traditions of the Yugambeh people. Ysola Best, Candace Kruger, Patricia O'Connor. Southport, Qld.: Keeaira Press. ISBN 0-9581169-1-1.
- Best, Ysola (1998). Borobi and his friends. Gillian Aird. Yugambeh Museum Language & Heritage Research Centre, Kombumerri Aboriginal Corp. for Culture. ISBN 0-9585570-0-4.
- Remnants of Gondwana : a natural and social history of the Gondwana rainforests of Australia. (2010). ISBN 978-0-9803113-5-8. (Posthumously)
