= Julia Lee-Thorp =

South African archaeologist and academic

- Born: 20 April 1951 (age 75)
- Education: University of Cape Town
- Known for: Stable Light Isotope
- Scientific career
- Fields: Archaeological science
- Workplaces: University of Cape Town; University of Bradford; University of Oxford; St Cross College

Julia Anne Lee-Thorp, FBA, FRSSAf, (born 20 April 1951) is a South African-born archaeologist and academic. She is Professor Emerita of Archaeological Science and Bioarchaeology at the University of Oxford. She served as head of the Stable Light Isotope Laboratory during her tenure, and as Head of the School of Archaeology 2016–2019. Lee-Thorp is most well known for her work on dietary ecology and human origins, using stable isotope chemistry to study fossil bones and teeth.

== Early life and education ==
Lee-Thorp was born on 20 April 1951 in Cape Town, South Africa. Studying at the University of Cape Town, she graduated with a Bachelor of Arts (BA), a Bachelor of Science (BSc) with a major in Chemistry, a BSc (Hons) in Archaeology and Doctor of Philosophy (PhD) degrees. Her doctoral thesis, titled "Stable carbon isotopes in deep time: the diets of fossil fauna and hominids," was completed in 1989 and demonstrated a method by which to significantly increase the applicable time-span of carbon isotopic analysis by using the most highly mineralised calcified animal tissue (a biological apatite), tooth enamel, as the sample material instead of traditionally used bone collagen. She also has an M.Phil. (Oxon).

== Academic career ==
Lee-Thorp remained at her alma mater, working as a senior research officer at the University of Cape Town's Archaeometry Research Unit (1991 to 1997). She was a senior lecturer in its Faculty of Science from 1998 to 2000 and an associate professor from 2001 to 2004. She was appointed Professor of Archaeology in 2005.

In 2005, she moved to the United Kingdom to take up the post of research director of Archaeological, Geographical and Environmental Sciences at the University of Bradford. She joined the University of Oxford in 2010 as Professor of Archaeological Science and a Fellow of St Cross College, Oxford. She has served as Vice-Head of the School of Archaeology from 2014 to 2016, and was its Head from 2016. She retired from full-time academia in 2019, becoming Professor Emerita of Archaeological Science at Oxford.

== Research ==
Lee-Thorp has been involved in a number of projects in Africa, South America, and Europe. In addition to diet, her more recent research has focused on the role of changing environments and climate on ancient human societies. She has been involved in a number of large-scale projects including the Paleodeserts Project, The Agricultural Origins of Urban Civilization (AGRICURB),, Building a Better Eggtimer., and A diet for all seasons: the role of intra-annual variability in the evolution hominin diets in East Africa .

== Honours ==
Professor Lee-Thorp was elected as a Fellow of the Royal Society of South Africa in 2004 Royal Society of South Africa., and as a Fellow of the British Academy (FBA), the United Kingdom's national academy for the humanities and social sciences. Fellow of the British Academy (FBA), the United Kingdom's national academy for the humanities and social sciences.

== Selected works ==
- Lee-Thorp, Julia A.; Sealy, Judith C.; van der Merwe, Nikolaas J. (November 1989). "Stable carbon isotope ratio differences between bone collagen and bone apatite, and their relationship to diet". Journal of Archaeological Science. 16 (6): 585–599. Bibcode:1989JArSc..16..585L. doi:10.1016/0305-4403(89)90024-1.
- Lee-Thorp, Julia A.; van der Merwe, Nikolaas J. (May 1991). "Aspects of the chemistry of modern and fossil biological apatites". Journal of Archaeological Science. 18 (3): 343–354. Bibcode:1991JArSc..18..343L. doi:10.1016/0305-4403(91)90070-6.
- Lee-Thorp, J. A. (December 2008). "On isotopes and old bones". Archaeometry. 50 (6): 925–950. doi:10.1111/j.1475-4754.2008.00441.x.
- Sponheimer, Matthew; Lee-Thorp, Julia A.; Reed, Kaye E.; Ungar, Peter, eds. (2013). Early Hominin Paleoecology. Boulder, CO: University Press of Colorado. ISBN 978-1607322245.
- Mayewski, Paul A.; Rohling, Eelco E.; Curt Stager, J.; Karlén, Wibjörn; Maasch, Kirk A.; Meeker, L. David; Meyerson, Eric A.; Gasse, Francoise; van Kreveld, Shirley; Holmgren, Karin; Lee-Thorp, Julia; Rosqvist, Gunhild; Rack, Frank; Staubwasser, Michael; Schneider, Ralph R.; Steig, Eric J. (20 January 2017). "Holocene Climate Variability". Quaternary Research. 62 (3): 243–255. doi:10.1016/j.yqres.2004.07.001. S2CID 17499244.
- Lee-Thorp J.A., N.J. van der Merwe 1987. Carbon isotope analysis of fossil bone apatite. S. Afr. J. Sci. 83: 712-713
- Lee-Thorp J.A., N.J. van der Merwe 1991. Aspects of the chemistry of modern and fossil biological apatites. J. Archaeol. Sci. 18: 343–354.
- Lee-Thorp J.A., N.J. van der Merwe, C.K. Brain 1994. Diet of Australopithecus robustus at Swartkrans deduced from stable carbon isotope ratios. J. Hum. Evol. 27: 361–372.
- Sponheimer M. J.A. Lee-Thorp 1999. Reconstructing the diet of the early hominid Australopithecus africanus using ^{13}C/^{12}C analysis. Science 283: 368–370.
- Roberts P., N. Perera, O. Wedage, S.Deraniyagala, J. Perera, S. Eregama, M.D. Petraglia, J.A. Lee-Thorp (2018) Fruits of the Forest: human stable isotope ecology and rainforest adaptations in Late Pleistocene and Holocene (c. 36 to 3 ka) Sri Lanka. Journal of Human Evolution.
- Snoeck, CS, J Pouncett, P Claeys, S. Goderis, N Mattielli, M. Parker Pearson, C Willis, A. Zazzo, JA Lee-Thorp, RJ Schulting. 2018 Strontium isotope analysis on cremated human remains from Stonehenge support links with west Wales. Scientific Reports 8:10790. DOI:10.1038/s41598-018-28969-8
- Czermak A, L. Schermellah, JA Lee-Thorp 2018 Short report: Image-assisted time-resolved dentine sampling to track weaning histories. DOI: 10.1002/oa.2697
- Ecker M, JS Brink, L Rossousw, M Chazan, LK Horwitz, JA Lee-Thorp 2018 The palaeoecological context of the Oldowan–Acheulean in southern Africa, Nature Ecology and Evolution, 2: 1080–1086.
- Lee-Thorp, J.A., M. Ecker. 2015. Holocene environmental change at Wonderwerk Cave, South Africa: Insights from stable light isotopes in ostrich egg shell. African Archaeological Review. DOI 10.1007/s10437-015-9202-y
- Lee-Thorp J.A., A. Likius, T.S. Mackaye, P. Vignaud, M. Sponheimer, M. Brunet 2012. Isotopic evidence for an early shift to C_{4} resources by Pliocene hominids in Chad. Proc. Natl. Acad. Sci. 109 (50): 20369-20372.
