= Tiina Manne =

Archaeologist

Tiina Manne FSA is an archaeologist and zooarchaeologist. She is an Associate Professor at the University of Queensland.

== Biography ==
Manne completed her BSc in Archaeology and Zoology at James Cook University in 1997. She has a MSc in marine geology from the University of Miami and a PhD in anthropology from the University of Arizona. Her research focusses on the faunal assemblages and the earliest inhabitants of Australia. In January 2020 she warned that the unusually intense 2019–20 Australian bushfire season may have damaged thousands of Aboriginal sites across Australia.

Manne is the president of the Australian Archaeological Association. She was elected as a Fellow of the Society of Antiquaries of London on 25 March 2021.

== Select publications ==
- Basiaco, Adriana, Urwin, Chris and Manne, Tiina. 2020. "Worked bone and teeth from Orokolo Bay in the Papuan Gulf (Papua New Guinea)". Australian Archaeology, 86 (3), 1–12. doi:10.1080/03122417.2020.1808560.
- Byrne, Chae, Dooley, Tom, Manne, Tiina, Paterson, Alistair and Dotte-Sarout, Emilie. 2019. "Island survival: the anthracological and archaeofaunal evidence for colonial-era events on Barrow Island, north-west Australia". Archaeology in Oceania, 55 (1) arco.5202, 15–32. doi:10.1002/arco.5202.
- Manne, Tiina. 2012. "Vale Boi: 10,000 years of Upper Paleolithic bone boiling". in Sarah R. Graff and Enrique Rodriguez-Alegria (eds), The menial art of cooking. University Press of Colorado. 173–199.
- Manne, Tiina, Cascalheira, João, Evora, Marina, Marreiros, João and Bicho, Nuno. 2012. "Intensive subsistence practices at Vale Boi, an Upper Paleolithic site in southwestern Portugal". Quaternary International, 264, 83–99. doi:10.1016/j.quaint.2012.02.026
