= Glynis Jones (archaeologist) =

British archaeologist

Glynis Eleanor Jones
- Education: University of Cambridge
- Scientific career
- Fields: Archaeologist / Archaeobotany
- Workplaces: Museum of London, University of Sheffield
- Thesis: The use of ethnographic and ecological models in the interpretation of archaeological plant remains (1983)

Glynis Eleanor Jones FBA is a British archaeobotanist, who is Professor of Archaeology at the University of Sheffield.

== Biography ==
Jones graduated from Cardiff University with a degree in zoology, before working as a science teacher in the UK and Greece. Next, Jones worked as a research assistant at the British School at Athens, before undertaking an MPhil and then PhD in Archaeology at the University of Cambridge. After completing her PhD, Jones worked in the Department of Urban Archaeology, Museum of London, before commencing an academic post at the University of Sheffield in 1984. In 2004 Jones was appointed Professor of Archaeology.

Jones has pioneered the development of archaeobotanical methodologies including ethnobotany, crop-processing analysis, weed ecology, and aDNA, and archaeobotanical research in Greece. Early work used ethnographic observations of crop-processing in Greece to produce models which could be applied to archaeobotanical remains. From the 1990s onwards, Jones has worked with colleagues including Amy Bogaard to develop the application of functional weed ecology to archaeobotanical assemblages in order to reconstruct past crop husbandry. More recently, Jones has been utilising DNA of modern landraces to investigate the spread of domesticated cereals into Europe, and working to develop the application of stable isotope analysis to archaeobotanical remains.

Jones is noted for her skill in teaching and research. Jones is credited with initiating archaeobotanical study in Greece, training Greek archaeologists in archaeobotany and initiating the recovery of macroscopic plant remains from archaeological sites.

Jones was elected as a Fellow of the British Academy in 2013. She is a vice-president of the British School at Athens, and serves on the editorial board of the Journal of Archaeological Science.

== Selected publications ==
- Jones, G. and Rowley-Conwy, P. 2007. On the importance of cereal cultivation in the British Neolithic, in S. Colledge and J. Conolly (eds.) The Origins and Spread of Domestic Plants Southwest Asia and Europe. Left Coast Press: 391-419.
- Jones, G., Charles, Bogaard, A. and Hodgson, J. 2010. Crops and weeds: the role of weed functional types in the identification of crop husbandry methods. Journal of Archaeological Science 37: 70-77.
- Jones, G., Charles, M., Colledge, S., Jones, M. Leigh, F., Lister, D., Powell, W., Smith L., Brown, T. and Jones. H. 2013. Barley DNA evidence for the routes of agricultural spread into Europe following multiple domestications in W. Asia. Antiquity 87: 701-13.
- Boardman, S. and Jones, G. 1990. Experiments on the effects of charring on cereal plant components. Journal of Archaeological Science 17: 1-11.
- Jones, G. 1991. Numerical analysis, in W. van Zeist, K. Wasylikowa and K.-E. Behre (eds.) Progress in Old World Palaeoethnobotany. Rotterdam: 63-80.
- Jones, G. 1992. Weed phytosociology and crop husbandry: identifying a contrast between ancient and modern practice. Review of Palaeobotany and Palynology 73: 133-43.
- Jones, G. and Halstead, P. 1995. Maslins, mixtures and monocrops: on the interpretation of archaeological crop samples of heterogenous composition. Journal of Archaeological Science 22: 103-14.
- Jones, G., Valamoti, S. and Charles, M. 2000. Early crop diversity: a `new´ glume wheat from northern Greece. Vegetation History and Archaeobotany 9: 133-46.
