= Laila Haglund =

Archaeologist

Laila Haglund is an archaeologist who played a key role in establishing consulting archaeology in Australia, and in drafting Queensland's first legislation to protect Aboriginal cultural heritage.

== Early life and education ==
Haglund was born in Sweden on 28 July 1934. She studied Latin, Greek and classical archaeology at the University of Lund. During her studies she visited Australia to study Cypriot pottery with Jim and Eve Stewart, where she also met with V. Gordon Childe. Observations of Aboriginal lithic scatters in the Bathurst area lead to her switching focus of study to prehistory and conservation at the University of London. During this period she excavated at archaeological sites in Britain and Sweden. In 1965 she emigrated to Australia with her Australian husband Malcolm Calley.

== 1965 salvage excavation at Broadbeach ==
In 1965 Haglund (the only archaeologist in the state at the time) was asked by the University of Queensland to conduct salvage excavations on the Gold Coast at the Broadbeach Aboriginal burial ground. Six seasons of excavations were undertaken between April 1965 and August 1968, recovering skeletal remains of over 150 Aboriginal people of the Kombumerri clan. Excavation methodologies were improvised during the course of the project; the excavation remains one of the largest to have taken place in Australia. On the basis of this work Haiglund received a MA from the University of Queensland and a PhD from Stockholm University. The excavation report was published in 1976, and described as "pioneer archaeological research".

Following the excavation, the human remains were returned to the local Aboriginal Community and subsequently reburied in 1988, one of the key examples of repatriation in Australia.

== Cultural heritage legislation work ==
Haglund drafted the first legislation to protect Aboriginal cultural heritage, which was enacted in 1967 as the Aboriginal Relics Preservation Act 1967. Haglund then sat as a Member of the Advisory Committee to the Queensland Minister for Conservation, Marine, and Aboriginal Affairs from 1967 to 1974. During this period she also lectured at the University of Queensland.

== Professionalisation of archaeology ==
Following the introduction of heritage legislation in New South Wales, Haglund saw the need to professionalise archaeology in Australia. She helped establish the Australian Association of Consulting Archaeologists Inc. (AACAI) and from 1979 to 1986 she was the inaugural president of the AACAI. To mark her major contribution to Australian professional archaeology, AACAI awards, at the annual Australian Archaeological Association conference, the Laila Haglund Prize for Excellence in Consulting. She was the first archaeologist to work purely as a consultant in Australia.

== Later career ==
Haglund was an adjunct research senior fellow at the University of Queensland in March 2019, but appears to have retired as of April 2020.

== Recognition ==
- The Laila Haglund Prize for Excellence on Consultancy was established by the AACAI in 2005. It is offered annually, awarded for "the paper presented at the AAA Annual Conference that makes the best contribution to consultancy in Australia".

== Selected publications ==
- Haglund, L. 1968. An Aboriginal Burial Ground at Broadbeach, Queensland: Excavation Report. Mankind 6(12): 676–680.
- Haglund, L. 1976. Dating aboriginal relics from the contact period. Archaeology in Oceania 11(3): 163–174. https://doi.org/10.1002/j.1834-4453.1976.tb00248.x
- Haglund, L. 1976. An archaeological analysis of the Broadbeach Aboriginal burial ground. St Lucia, Queensland: University of Queensland Press.
- Haglund, L. 1984. Checklist and Requirements for Consultant's Reports. Sydney: Australian Association of Consulting Archaeologists Inc.
