= Sharon Sullivan =

Archaeologist and author

- Education: University of New England, Australia
- Scientific career
- Fields: Archaeology
- Workplaces: Sullivan Blazejowski and Associates

Sharon Sullivan AO FAHA is an Australian archaeologist, advocate of Indigenous Australian rights, and author of five books on heritage management. She is best known for her work in establishing protocols and programs for cultural heritage management in Australia.

== Education ==
In 1964, Sullivan graduated with degrees in history and archaeology from the University of New England, Australia. Her Honours thesis, supervised by Isabel McBryde, was the first completed on prehistoric archaeology in Australia. In 1965, Sullivan completed a degree in education (DipEd) from the University of New England. In 1974, Sullivan completed a master's degree in archaeology. In 2003, Sullivan was conferred an honorary Doctor of Letters from James Cook University.

== Career ==
Sullivan began her 20-year career as a public servant for the New South Wales National Parks and Wildlife Service where she advocated for heritage management legislation. She was an assistant professor at the University of New England and University of Queensland. She currently operates the Sullivan Blazejowski and Associates heritage consulting firm. She has worked with global organizations including the Chinese government where she helped to cultivate heritage conservation at sites including the Mogao Caves. She held a seat on the Australian Heritage Council as a historic expert from November 2008 until November 2011. Sullivan is the author of five books and 50 papers. On Australia Day in 2004, Sullivan was first acknowledged by the Order of Australia in a list of Honours. She was awarded membership in ICOMOS Worldwide and served on the Australian ICOMOS committee in the early 2000s. In 2005, Sullivan was awarded the Rhys Jones Medal for Outstanding Contribution to Australian Archaeology. In 2013, to honor her lifelong contributions, the Australian Heritage Council named the Sharon Sullivan National Heritage Award that recognizes contributions made to natural, indigenous and historical heritage.

== Publications ==
- Sullivan, S. 2015 Does the practice of heritage as we know it have a future? Historic Environment 27(2): 110-117.
- Sullivan, S. and R. Mackay (eds) 2012 Archaeological Sites - Conservation and Management. Los Angeles, CA: The Getty Conservation Institute.
- Altenburg, K. and S. Sullivan 2012 A matter of principle: Heritage management in Australia and China. Historic Environment 24(1): 41-48.
- Sullivan, S. 2008 More Unconsidered Trifles? Aboriginal and Archaeological Heritage Values: Integration and Disjuncture in Cultural Heritage Management Practice. Australian Archaeology 67(1): 107-115.
- Sullivan, S. 2004 Local Involvement and Traditional Practices in the World Heritage System. In E. de Merode, R. Smeets and C. Westrik (eds.), Linking Universal and Local Values: Managing a Sustainable Future for World Heritage, pp. 49–55. World Heritage Papers 13. Paris: UNESCO World Heritage Centre.
- Sullivan, S. 2004 Aboriginal sites and the Burra Charter. Historic Environment 18(1): 37-39.
- Pearson M. and S. Sullivan 1995 Looking After Heritage Places: The Basics of Heritage Planning for Managers, Landowners, and Administrators. Melbourne: Melbourne University Press.
- Sullivan, S. 1993 Cultural values and cultural imperialism. Historic Environment 10(2/3): 54-62.
- Sullivan, S. 1983 Aboriginal sites and ICOMOS guidelines. Historic Environment 3(1): 14-33.
- Sullivan S. "Aboriginal Relics in New South Wales: Sharon Sullivan."
- Sullivan S. "The Aborigines of New South Wales: Mountain People."
- Sullivan S. "The Traditional Culture of the Aborigines of North Western New South Wales."

== Recognition ==
- Elected as a Fellow of the Australian Academy of the Humanities in 1996
- Awarded the Centenary Medal in 2001
- Honoured as Officer of the Order of Australia in 2004
- Awarded the Rhys Jones Medal in 2005
- Awarded life membership of ICOMOS worldwide in 2005
