= Puritjarra =

Ancient rock shelter in the Central Australia

Puritjarra is an archaeological site located in the western part of Central Australia in Cleland Hills, 350 kilometers west of Alice Springs. An ancient rock shelter, this site is located within the traditional Aboriginal lands of the Kukatja people. The site is significant due to its ancient rock art and the stone artifacts that have been found there.

== Archaeological findings ==
With some of the oldest rock art in Australia and a stone artifact typology stretching over 30 millennia, Puritjarra is a place in which many archeological excavations have taken place. It dates to at least 32,000 B.P. with findings from the Pleistocene into the Holocene. The rock shelter has a sandy floor and a reliable water source nearby. At the site, there are some rock art engravings in stone.

Flaked stone artifacts were found, some made from locally sourced materially (silicified sandstone, clear quartz and ironstone) and some from other materials sourced from further away (white chalcedony, nodular chert, and silcrete). Grey silcrete was used to make the blades for men's knives at Puritjarra. This silcrete would have been sourced from elsewhere in the Cleland Hills. Archaeologist Mike Smith found that there was little change in the types of resources and materials used throughout the Pleistocene and into the Holocene. Flake and core methods for creating stone tools stayed relatively the same. Tula stone tools as well as thumbnail scrapers that were most likely hafted have also been found at the site.

Researchers have determined that the site was occupied throughout the late Pleistocene and into the last millennium. Some of the rock art at Puritjarra has been dated to the mid-Holocene.

== History of archaeological research ==
Puritjarra was first excavated between 1986 and 1990 by archaeologist Mike Smith. A series of trenches and grid square excavation pits were dug for the research. Extensive chronology was done on the site through radiocarbon dating at each excavation which dates the site to 32,000 B.P. or 35,000 B.P.
