= Oli Wilson =

New Zealand musician and musicologist

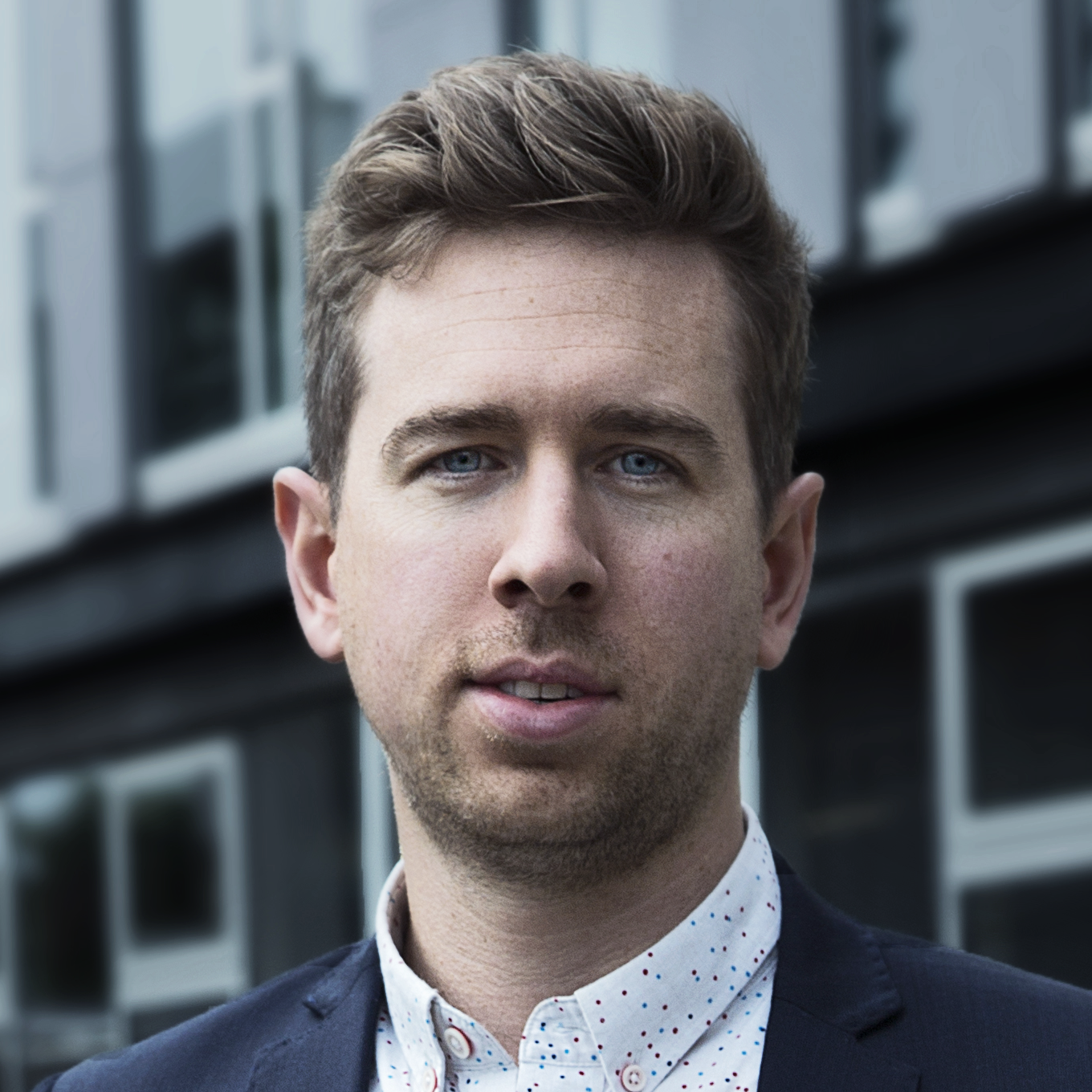
- Born: Palmerston North, New Zealand

Academic background
- Education: University of Otago
- Thesis: Ples and the production of Lokal music in Port Moresby, Papua New Guinea (2012)
- Doctoral advisor: Glenn Summerhayes

Academic work
- Institutions: Massey University

Oli Wilson is a New Zealand ethnomusicologist and a member of The Chills.

== Academic career ==
Wilson was raised in Palmerston North, the son of deer researcher Peter Wilson, who retired as professor emeritus at Massey University. He graduated with a Bachelor of Music from the University of Otago in 2007, and completed his PhD there in 2012 with a thesis entitled Ples and the production of Lokal music in Port Moresby, Papua New Guinea. His PhD work while based at the University of Papua New Guinea studied the production of pop music (known as Lokal music) in Port Moresby.

After working as a lecturer in Otago University's Music Department, Wilson joined Massey University's College of Creative Arts in 2015 as programme leader of the new Wellington-based commercial music degree. He is currently an Associate Professor and Director of Research at the College of Creative Arts.

== Research ==
One of Wilson's research areas is the transformation of the music industry in Papua New Guinea with the increasing access to recording technology. He studies the way the music industry operates, both in New Zealand and overseas, from the viewpoint of a practising musician and an ethnographer.

Wilson is currently the co-editor of the journal Perfect Beat: The Asia Pacific Journal of Contemporary Music and Popular Culture.

== Music ==
A classically trained pianist, Wilson was a founder member of the four-piece Dunedin self-described "doom pop" band Knives at Noon, and played keyboards on their EP Glitter Guts.

Since 2010 Wilson has been a keyboard player for the iconic Dunedin band The Chills. He toured Australia and New Zealand with both Knives at Noon and The Chills, and has toured Europe, Britain, and the US with the latter.

== Selected research ==
- Wilson, Oli (2013). "Popular Music as Local Culture: An Ethnographic Study of the Album Matha Wa! by the Band Paramana Strangers from Papua New Guinea". Musicology Australia. 35 (2): 253–267. doi:10.1080/08145857.2013.844516. S2CID 191333378.
- Wilson, O. R.; Holland, M. (April 2015). "Technostalgia in new recording projects by the 1980s 'Dunedin Sound' band The Chills". Journal on the Art of Record Production. 9. ISSN 1754-9892.
- Wilson, Oli (5 September 2014). "Selling Lokal Music: A Comparison of the Content and Promotion of Two Locally Recorded and Released Albums in Port Moresby, Papua New Guinea". Journal of World Popular Music. 1 (1): 51–71. doi:10.1558/jwpm.v1i1.51. ISSN 2052-4919.
