= School of Archaeology, University of Oxford =

Department of Oxford University

The School of Archaeology is an academic department at the Social Sciences Division at the University of Oxford in Oxford, England, United Kingdom.

It comprises the Institute of Archaeology and the Research Laboratory for Archaeology and the History of Art (RLAHA). The school was created in 2000 when the two existing departments were combined under this umbrella. Both sub-departments retain separate directors, who report to the head of the School of Archaeology, who is replaced every three years.

By custom, the head alternates between an academics based in each of the sub-departments. The current head of school is Amy Bogaard. While Bogaard was due to be replaced in 2022, her term was extended by a year due to COVID-19.

== Previous Heads of Department ==
- Chris Gosden, 2004-2006
- Helena Hamerow, 2010-2013
- Andrew Wilson, 2013–2016
- Julia Lee-Thorp, 2016–2019
- Amy Bogaard, 2019–Present
