= Sandra Bowdler =

Australian archaeologist

- Born: 1946 (age 79–80)
- Education: Australian National University (PhD)
- Employer: University of Western Australia
- Known for: Emeritus Professor of Archaeology

Sandra Bowdler (born 1946) is an Australian archaeologist, emeritus professor of archaeology and former head of the Archaeology Department at the University of Western Australia.

== Education ==
Bowdler completed an Honours degree in archaeology at the University of Sydney in 1971 and received her PhD from the Australian National University in 1979. Bowdler's PhD thesis was on the Aboriginal archaeology of Hunter Island in the Bass Strait near Tasmania, which was later published in 1984.

== Career ==
Bowdler was appointed Professor of Archaeology at the University of Western Australia in 1983, where her research covered Australian Indigenous archaeology, and in particular Shark Bay, Tasmania and coastal New South Wales, known as part of New England, as well as the pre-neolithic archaeology of East and Southeast Asia.

She was at various times a tutor of prehistory at the University of Papua New Guinea, a research scholar with the Department of Prehistory Research, School of Pacific Studies at the Australian National University, lecturer in archaeology at the University of New England, Aboriginal sites consultant for the Forestry Commission of New South Wales and in private practice in Sydney, and professor of archaeology at the University of Western Australia.

In 2007 she instigated the Festival Baroque Australia, a Western Australian Baroque music festival, curating festivals and concerts in Perth.

From 2008, Bowdler was an emeritus professor and senior honorary research fellow of archaeology, and an honorary senior research fellow in the School of Music, at UWA.

Throughout her career Bowdler has held several positions on committees and boards including the president of the Australian Archaeology Association (1980-1981), member on the ICOMOS Executive Committee for Australasia (1982 - 1984), member of the Aboriginal Cultural Materials Committee (1983-1992), member of the management group of the International Committee of Archaeological Heritage Management (1984-1989), on the Board of Trustees of the Western Australian Museum (1984-1989), and on the National Cultural Heritage Committee (1988-1992).

== Publications ==
As a member of the Australian Museum in 1964, she documented the Aboriginal burial site in the Balls Head rock shelter, and has written extensively on the Aboriginal ceremonial Bora rings.

In 2008, a special volume of the journal Australian Archaeology was published in Bowdler's honour. Edited by Jane Balme and Sue O'Connor, the special volume was titled More Unconsidered Trifles: Papers to Celebrate the Career of Sandra Bowdler and featured contributions from many of Bowdler's students.

From 2015 to 2019, Bowdler was editor of the journal Australian Archaeology.

Bowdler has researched and published extensively on the archaeology of music and ritual, Australian Aboriginal archaeology, coastal archaeology, early Asian archaeology, gender and society in archaeology, shell midden studies, and Tasmanian Aborigines in the pre-Colonial and Colonial periods.
