= Isabel McBryde =

Australian archaeologist (1934–2026)

Isabel McBryde AO FAHA
- Born: 16 July 1934; Fremantle, Western Australia, Australia
- Died: 26 July 2026 (aged 92); Canberra, Australian Capital Territory, Australia
- Other name: "Mother of Australian archaeology"
- Occupation: Archaeologist
- Years active: 1960–2000s

Isabel McBryde AO FAHA (16 July 1934 – 26 July 2026) was an Australian archaeologist and emeritus professor at the Australian National University (ANU) and School Fellow, in the School of Social Sciences, Faculty of Arts. McBryde is credited with training "at least three generations of Australian archaeologists" and is affectionately referred to as the "Mother of Australian Archaeology". McBryde had a "holistic" approach to studying the archaeology of Aboriginal Australia, which has been carried on by many of her students (and her students' students). McBryde has also made considerable contributions to the preservation and protection of Australian cultural heritage, particularly Aboriginal cultural heritage.

== Background ==
McBryde was born in Fremantle, Western Australia on 16 July 1934. Her family moved to Melbourne not long after her birth. McBryde completed honours and master's degrees, in Latin and history, at the University of Melbourne. She received her formal archaeological training at Cambridge University where she undertook a Diploma in Prehistoric Archaeology in 1959.

In 1960, McBryde returned to Australia and was appointed the first lecturer in prehistory and ancient history at the University of New England (UNE), the first titled position of its kind in Australia. She completed her PhD at UNE in 1966 with a regional study of the Aboriginal archaeology of the New England region of New South Wales. According to Sandra Bowdler and Genevieve Clune, her PhD was the first-ever awarded based on Australian archaeological fieldwork. At UNE, McBryde set up courses in archaeology, focusing on the "importance of regionally focused archaeology".

She was appointed senior lecturer in the Department of Prehistory and Anthropology at the ANU in 1974, and in 1986 she was appointed the chair of prehistory. McBryde retired from ANU in 1994.

McBryde died on 26 July 2026, at the age of 92.

== Awards and honours ==
McBryde was elected as a Fellow of the Australian Academy of the Humanities in 1979.

In 1990, McBryde became an Officer of the Order of Australia (AO) for her "service to education, particularly in the field of Australian Prehistory". In 2001, McBryde received a further honour from the Australian Government, being awarded a Centenary Medal "for service to cultural heritage and as a distinguished archaeologist". McBryde remained continually involved within the world of archaeological academia with great enthusiasm, as she routinely reviewed fellow archaeological work.

In 2003, McBryde was awarded the Rhys Jones Medal for Outstanding Contribution to Australian Archaeology, which is the highest honour bestowed by the Australian Archaeological Association. In the citation for her medal it was noted that: "Few people have created such an enduring legacy for Australian archaeology. She has touched the minds, hearts and actions of virtually the entire Australian archaeological community. She is celebrated by students, Indigenous communities, colleagues and friends."

In 2005, McBryde was awarded life membership for Outstanding Contribution to the Australian Archaeological Association, an association of which she was a founding member, and also served as its first secretary in 1974–1975.

Her work is described and lauded in Billy Griffiths' 2018 award-winning book Deep Time Dreaming: Uncovering Ancient Australia.

== Publications ==
- Aboriginal prehistory in New England : an archaeological survey of northeastern New South Wales. Sydney: Sydney University Press. 1974. p. 390. ISBN 0424065304.
- Records of Times Past: Ethnohistorical Essays of the Culture and Ecology of the New England Tribes. Canberra: Australian Institute of Aboriginal Studies. 1978. ISBN 9780855750671.
- Coast and Estuary: Archaeological Investigations on the North Coast of New South Wales at Wombah and Schnapper Point. contributions by V.M Campbell. Canberra: Australian Institute of Aboriginal Studies. 1982. ISBN 9780855751173.
- Who Owns the Past?: Papers From the Annual Symposium of the Australian Academy of the Humanities. Melbourne: Oxford University Press. 1985. ISBN 9780195545654.
- Guests of the Governor: Aboriginal Residents of the First Government House. Sydney: Friends of the First Government House Site. 1989. ISBN 9780731655083.
