= World Archaeology =

Quarterly academic journal

- Discipline: Archaeology
- Language: English
- Edited by: Amy Bogaard

Publication details
- History: 1969–present
- Publisher: Routledge
- Frequency: Quarterly

Standard abbreviations
- ISO 4: World Archaeol.

Indexing
- CODEN: WOAREN
- ISSN: 0043-8243 (print); 1470-1375 (web)
- LCCN: 75646489
- JSTOR: 00438243
- OCLC no.: 48535549

Links
- Journal homepage; Online access; Online archive

World Archaeology is a peer-reviewed academic journal covering all aspects of archaeology. It was established in 1969 and originally published triannually by Routledge & Kegan Paul. In 2004 it changed to a quarterly publication schedule while remaining under the Routledge imprint.

Each of the year's first three issues within a volume are dedicated to specific individual themes and topics within archaeology, and contributions address the topic from a variety of perspectives. The fourth and last issue of the year has been given over to coverage of current debates within archaeology, in which papers discuss significant issues and global concerns in the field.

== Abstracting and indexing ==
The journal is abstracted and indexed in:

- Abstracts in Anthropology
- America: History and Life
- Anthropological Index Online
- Anthropological Literature
- Art Index
- Avery Index to Architectural Periodicals
- Bibliography of the History of Art
- Bibliography of Native North Americans
- British & Irish Archaeological Bibliography
- British Humanities Index
- Scopus
- GEOBASE
- Historical Abstracts
- Humanities Index
- Humanities International Index
- Index Islamicus
- International Bibliography of the Social Sciences
- Linguistic Bibliography
- New Testament Abstracts
- ProQuest Central
- Religion Index One
- Arts and Humanities Citation Index
