= Warragarra rock shelter =

Ancient rock shelter in the Tasmanian highlands of Australia

Warragarra rock shelter is a rock shelter that measures about 35 x 15 meters located in the Tasmanian highlands near Mt. Ossa. The rockshelter is heavily cited as evidence of Aboriginal Tasmanians adapting to climate change allowing them new economic opportunities and survival strategies.

== History of research ==
The archaeologist Harry Lourandos cited Warragarra rockshelter as one of his main sites of archaeological significance in his paper 10,000 years in the Tasmanian highlands. Lourandos discusses how he excavated 2.5 meters squared of the site, this was enough to reveal two stratigraphic sequences that show two separate periods of habitation. In this paper Lourandos observes that during the Pleistocene much of Tasmania, including the valley that Warragarra rock shelter is located in, was covered in glaciers which had prevented humans from expanding their territory throughout Tasmania limiting them to the northern coasts of the island. Palynological studies have shown that this glaciation retreated around 11,500 years ago and temperature continued to rise until about 9,500 years ago. These climatic events along with stratigraphic layers of excavations at the site reflect that Aboriginal Tasmanians adapted to their changing climate. During this time period it is believed Aboriginal Tasmanians migrated inland from the coast to take advantage of newly available resources. Additionally Nick Porch and Jim Allen, two other prolific Australian archaeologists, state that the Warragarra rock shelter site provides significant evidence for the continued habitation of inland Tasmania.

Porch and Allen looked further into the rock shelter determined to find if there were any earlier inhabitants of the site, looking into the way it formed to better understand occupation patterns of the site. The two archaeologists found that the rock shelter was not always the ideal habitation area it is today. It is believed that the rock shelter was partially formed by a glacier which had occupied the region, then the rock bed which had formed the shelter collapsed which created an area that was much more habitable for human occupation. In Porch and Allens' search for older inhabitants of the site they found that the site itself did not exist, at least not in the way we know today, until about 10,000 years ago.

== Archaeological evidence of human exploitation of a changed landscape ==
Tasmania being located far south on the map leaves the island vulnerable to large amounts of climatic variability it is believed that most of the island was covered in glacial ice shelfs until about 11,500 years ago when the global climate began to warm and ice caps began to melt. During this time period of rapid warming the landscape surrounding Warragarra rock shelter began to change, changing from a thick rainforest to more of a woody grassland region which was much more inhabitable. This vegetation change can be seen throughout Tasmania as the climate became more temperate. With this new warmer climate Aboriginal Tasmanians had moved inland to take advantage of new economic opportunities.

Lourandos points out that the rock shelter had two main timeframes of habitation. The older layer reveals a more temporary habitation theorized to be a rest point between two other sites. The newer layer according to Lourandos seems to be a more permanent settlement, as shown by the intensity of remains within the newer sediments.
