= Kombumerri clan =

Aboriginal Australian people

The Kombumerri are an Indigenous people of the Nerang area on the Gold Coast, Queensland, Australia. They have long been considered one of nine distinct named clan estate groups of the Yugambeh people. However, this claim has been potentially contested by the National Native Title Tribunal.

== Name ==
The ethnonym kombumerri has been related to a Yugambeh word, gūmbo, which refers to a type of shellfish called a mudflat or cobra (Note: The word "cobra" comes from a Georges River dialect term cahbro, surviving in the placename Cabramatta. A local toponym Koomboobah means "place of cobra worms". (Longhurst 1980, p. 22)) with -merri meaning "man" and thus means "cobra people". Such cobra were a delicacy in the aboriginal diet.

The autonym of the people of the Nerang area is not known. Kombumerri was first registered in 1914, when, assisted by a local schoolteacher, John Lane, Bullum (John Allen), composed a grammar and word list of the Yugambeh dialect. In this work, Allen, who belonged to the Wangerriburra tribe, mentioned that it was the name for the Nerang River people. Whether this is a Wangerriburra exonym or not is not known. In 1923 Archibald Meston stated that the Nerang tribe was called the "Talgiburri". Germaine Greer cites the authority of Margaret Sharpe for the view that the root of Talgiburri, namely talgi- represents dalgay (dry). She thus takes Dalgaybara to mean people of the dry sclerophyll forest, rather than salt-water people. The same root underlies the clan name Tulgigin, which is taken to mean "dry forest people", said to dwell south of the northern rim of the caldera. Meston also mentioned another Nerang tribe as distinct from the Talgiburri, namely the Chabbooburri, and, writing in 1923, considered both "extinct".

John Gladstone Steele states that the Nerang river tribe was known as the Ngarangbal-speaking Nerang-ballun, and adds that the toponym nerang has several etymologies: ngarang has been taken to mean "little stream"; as a language name it might suggest that the Ngaranbal were a people who used the word ngaraa for the idea of "what"; alternatively it may be related to neerang/neerung, with the sense of shovel-nosed shark.

== Language ==
The Kombumerri people spoke a dialect, of which some 500 words have been preserved, of the Yugambeh-Bundjalung languages. Knowledge of the grammar is otherwise sketchy. John Allen appears to have considered this coastal language as a dialect of Bandjalang, yet not mutually intelligible with Yugumbir.

Modern linguists such as Terry Crowley have argued that the languages of this area consisted of two dialects, Ngarangwal between the Coomera and Logan rivers and a dialect employed between the Nerang and the Tweed, the latter with a 75% overlap with Nganduwal.

== Country ==
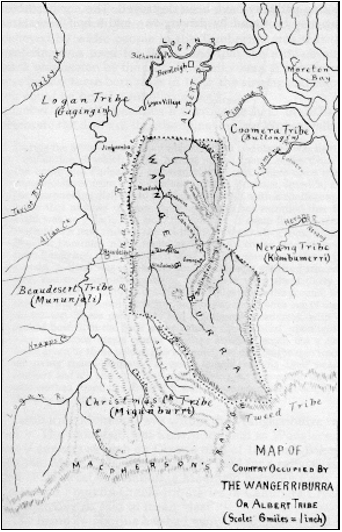
Partial Yugambeh clan map c. 1913

Their tribal boundaries are said by Ysola Best to have extended north to the Coomera River, south to Tallebudgera Creek and west to the Gold Coast hinterland. According to John Allen's map, the Kombumerri were located south of the Bullongin clan on the Coomera River, and north-east of the Tweed clan (whose traditional name was not noted by Allen) within the Tweed Caldera, with the Wangerriburra in the hinterland to their west.

== Dreaming ==
A story was recorded by Jack Gresty, a National Park Ranger who worked in the Numinbah Valley area. Gresty picked it up from the Duncan brothers. It concerns the Nerang culture hero Gowonda, a white-haired hunter and expert in training dingoes to hunt, particularly associated with Southport. He eventually died and his people grieved over their loss. Then:

One day some children were playing on the sandy beach between the Nerang River and the ocean at a place we know as Main Beach when one cried out 'look, there is Gowanda in the waves'. The other children looked and were quite sure it was him. They ran to the camp to tell the others they had seen Gowanda in the waves. Men, women and children came running out to the beach and there was Gowanda swimming close to the shore. They could see him clearly and could recognise him by his white fin, although in the dreamtime he had been changed into a Dolphin. They could see him teaching the other Dolphins to drive fish onto the beach so that his people could net them. Among every shoal of Dolphins you will see the leader with a white fin, which the Aborigines believed to be a descendant of Gowanda or another hunter returned from the dreamtime. Dolphins were greatly appreciated for their services and were not hunted in this area.

In 1984, H. J. Hall asserted that the collaboration of aborigines and dolphins in fishing was restricted to an area further north, specifically to the Nunukul area of Amity Point on North Stradbroke Island. Sceptics make much of a remark by an early observer of the practice at Amity Point, Fairholme, writing in 1856, that "Porpoises (Note: Writing "porpoise" for "dolphin" was a typical 19th century misprision. (Neil 2002, p. 5)) abound in the Bay, but in no other part do the natives fish with their assistance." His restrictive view was challenged by David Neil in 2002, who noted that the historic evidence, such as that of Curtis, James Backhouse and others, documented that this custom was attested as much more widespread along the Queensland coast down into colonial times.

== History of contact ==
The Nerang area was first penetrated by whites searching for stands of cedar in 1842 when two boys, Edmund Harper and William Duncan (14) penetrated the Numinbah Valley as far as Cave Creek's outlet on the Nerang. One local history recounts that:

Two young men who had been companions for some time and were on friendly terms with the natives were among the newcomers. They were Edmund Harper and William Duncan. A rafting ground was first established at the mouth of Little Tallebudgera Creek. Later Edmund Harper made his home there to which he brought his mother. Harper and Duncan remained together in the district, and associating with the natives, could speak the dialects of the Tweed and Nerang tribes so well that the blacks could not tell from their speech that they were not of the tribes.

They were too young to work the massive red cedars there, but returned after some decades, Duncan establishing himself in the distinct in 1848 at Boobigan. Regarding Duncan's movements in the Nerang district, Gresty states:

William Duncan did pit sawing and squaring in and about Nerang, and with other timber-getters, Jim Beattie, Fred Fowler. and John Johnston, they made their first camp in the Numinbah Valley at Jigibill (the site later on of Yaun's sawmill, which was destroyed by fire some years ago).

Duncan's surviving sons (John, Robert, and Hugh) (Note: Greer gives the name of two, Jack and Sandy. (Greer 2014, p. 313)) later served as the main informants on Aboriginal history for J.A Gresty's work in the Numinbah Valley. (Note: Gresty states: Duncan, who was born in Aberdeen (1826), came to Australia with his parents at the age of seven. He moved from Murwillumbah to Karara (then known as Boobigan) in 1848, and later married Rose Gorrian, a lass from Ireland. They reared a family of fourteen children (ten sons and four daughters), the eldest, Alexander, born in Brisbane in 1855. Four sons survive, of whom three (John, Robert, and Hugh), still resident in the Nerang district, are responsible for most of the data of this paper, patiently compiled by them for me over the past ten years.) Fred Fowler also learnt language from the Nerang people, and provided a wordlist to Edward Curr of Nerang Creek words.

Harper also married an Aboriginal woman from the Nerang area and had a son, Billy, and had occasion to challenge Archibald Meston's assertions regarding Nerang aboriginal names. Archibald Meston stated that the Aboriginal population on the Nerang river around 1870 was about 200.

== Important landmarks ==
There are significant sites all over the Gold Coast, particularly at Burleigh Heads, Queensland. This mountain is a "sacred women's area" for the Kombumerri people and their ancestors today. There is a men's area not far from sacred mountain at the Jebribillum Bora Park on the Gold Coast Highway.

Archaeologist Laila Haglund excavated the Broadbeach burial site, which was unknown to local Aboriginal people, and of which no record existed, that came to light in June 1963, about 1.5 kilometres (0.93 mi) inland from Mermaid Beach and not far from the mouth of the Nerang River. Soil contractors had removed earth for reuse as garden fertiliser in the Gold Coast area without asking permission from the landowner, Alfred Grant of the Mermaid Keys Development Pty. Ltd. It became the first systematic archaeological excavation of an Aboriginal burial ground, undertaken with urgency also because the larvae of Christmas beetles were infesting the exposed bones. She and her amateur group managed to retrieve the remains of roughly 150 persons. Through the agency of Graham family and the Kombumerri Aboriginal Corporation the bones were laid to rest in a nearby park at Broadbeach in 1988 with a plaque dedicated to their memory.

== Notable people ==
Mary Graham, a philosopher of mixed Wakawaka and Kombumerri descent, has written on the philosophical background of Aboriginal world views.

== Alternative names ==
- Chabbooburri
- Dalgaybara
- Nerang tribe
- Nerang-ballun
- Talgiburri

== Some words ==
- beeyung (father)
- duckering (white man)
- groman (kangaroo)
- nogum (tame dog)
- uragin (wild dog)
- wyung (mother)

Source: Fowler 1887, p. 240

== See also ==
- Mununjali clan
- Wanggeriburra clan

== Sources ==
- Aird, Michael (2002). "Developments in the repatriation of human remains and other cultural items in Queensland, Australia". In Fforde, Cressida; Hubert, Jane; Paul, Turnbull (eds.). The dead and their possessions: repatriation in principle, policy and practice. Routledge. pp. 303–311. ISBN 978-0-415-34449-4.
- Allen, John; Lane, John (1914). "Grammar, Vocabulary, and Notes of the Wangerriburra Tribe" (PDF). Annual Report of the Chief Protector of Aborigines for the year 1913. Brisbane: Anthony James Cumming for the Queensland Government. pp. 23–36.
- Attenbrow, Val (2009). Food from the sea: shellfish and crustaceans. Sydney: Australian Museum.
- Backhouse, James (1843). A narrative of a visit to the Australian colonies. London: Hamilton, Adams and Co.
- Best, Ysola; Barlow, Alex (1997). Kombumerri, saltwater people. Port Melbourne: Heinemann Library Australia. pp. 16–21. ISBN 978-1863910378. OCLC 52249982.
- "Broadbeach commemorates cultural heritage and local history" (Press release). The Queensland Cabinet and Ministerial Directory. 8 November 2015.
- Brown, Elaine Rosemary (2000). Cooloola Coast: Noosa to Fraser Island: the Aboriginal and Settlers Histories of a Unique Environment. University of Queensland Press. ISBN 978-0-702-23129-2.
- Crowley, Terry (1978). The middle Clarence dialects of Bandjalang. Australian Institute of Aboriginal Studies.
- Cunningham, M. (1969). A Description of the Yugumbir Dialect of Bandjalang (PDF). Vol. 1. University of Queensland Papers. pp. 69–122.
- Curtis, John (1838). Shipwreck of the Stirling Castle: containing a faithful narrative of the dreadful sufferings of the crew and the cruel murder of Captain Fraser by the savages (PDF). London: George Virtue.
- Fairholme, J. K. E. (1856). "The blacks of Moreton Bay and the porpoises". Proceedings of the Zoological Society of London. 24: 353–354.
- Fowler, F. (1887). "No. 172 - Nerang Creek" (PDF). In Curr, Edward Micklethwaite (ed.). The Australian race: its origin, languages, customs, place of landing in Australia and the routes by which it spread itself over the continent (PDF). Vol. 3. Melbourne: J. Ferres. pp. 240–241.
- Graham, Mary (1999). "Some Thoughts about the Philosophical Underpinnings of Aboriginal Worldviews". Worldviews: Environment, Culture, Religion. 3 (2): 105–118. doi:10.1163/156853599X00090 – via Australian Humanities Review.
- Greer, Germaine (2014). White Beech: The Rainforest Years. A&C Black. ISBN 978-1-408-84671-1.
- Gresty, J. A. (1947). "Numinbah Valley: its geography, history and aboriginal associations". Queensland Geographical Journal. 51: 57–72.
- Haglund, Laila (1976). The Broadbeach Aboriginal Burial Ground: An Archaeological Analysis (PDF). St Lucia, Qld: University of Queensland Press. ISBN 0-7022-0860-4.
- Hall, H. J. (1984). "Fishing with dolphins?: affirming a traditional Aboriginal fishing story in Moreton Bay, SE. Queensland". In Coleman, Roger J.; Covacevich, Jeannette; Davie, Paul (eds.). Focus on Stradbroke: New Information on North Stradbroke Island and Surrounding Areas. Boolarong Press. pp. 132–134. ISBN 978-0-908-17581-9.
- Hill, Marji (2007). "Ysola Best, 1940-2007". Australian Aboriginal Studies. 2: 200–201. ISSN 0729-4352.
- Longhurst, Robert I. (1980). "The Gold Coast: Its First Inhabitants" (PDF). John Oxley Journal: A Bulletin for Historical Research in Queensland. 1 (2): 15–24.
- Matthews, Jacq; Gorman, Alice; Wallis, Lynley (2015). "Laila Haglund: The Creation of a Profession". TrowelBlazers.
- Meston, Archibald (14 July 1923). "Lost Tribes at Moreton Bay". The Brisbane Courier. p. 18 – via Trove.
- Neil, David T. (2002). "Cooperative fishing interactions between Aboriginal Australians and dolphins in eastern Australia". Anthrozoös. 15 (1): 3–18. doi:10.2752/089279302786992694. S2CID 144814874.
- "Nerang River Catchment: a Study Guide" (PDF). Gold Coast City Council. 2011.
- Sharpe, Margaret C. (1985). "Bundjalung Settlement and Migration" (PDF). Aboriginal History. 9 (1): 101–124.
- Sharpe, Margaret C. (1993). "Bundjalung: Teaching a Disappearing Language". In Walsh, Michael; Yallop, Colin (eds.). Language and Culture in Aboriginal Australia. Aboriginal Studies Press. pp. 73–84. ISBN 978-0-855-75241-5.
- Steele, John Gladstone (1984). Aboriginal Pathways: in Southeast Queensland and the Richmond River. University of Queensland Press. ISBN 978-0-702-25742-1.
