= Lynley Wallis =

Australian archaeologist and academic researcher

Lynley A. Wallis is an Australian archaeologist and Associate Professor at Griffith University. She is a specialist in palaeoenvironmental reconstruction through the analysis of phytoliths.

== Education ==
Wallis obtained her PhD from the Australian National University (ANU). Her PhD thesis titled Phytoliths, Late Quaternary Environment and Archaeology in Tropical Semi-arid Northwest Australia demonstrated the suitability of phytolith analysis to questions of palaeoenvironmental interest in the tropical semi-arid areas and, subsequently, produced the first detailed late Quaternary terrestrial vegetation record for northwest Australia.

== Career ==
Her career spans both private and public sector cultural heritage management, university lecturing and research in both Indigenous and historical archaeology.

She was employed as a lecturer in the School of Anthropology, Archaeology and Sociology at James Cook University (2001–2002) and then for five years at Flinders University (2005–2009). From 2009–2011, Associate Professor Wallis served as a senior research fellow at the Aboriginal Environments Research Centre (AERC) at the University of Queensland. From 2016–2020 Wallis was a senior research fellow with Nulungu Research Institute at University of Notre Dame but in 2020 took up a research position at Griffith University in Brisbane.

Between these academic positions, Wallis worked as senior conservation officer for the Heritage Unit, Environment ACT (2002–2004) and then as a senior research officer at the Australian Institute of Aboriginal and Torres Strait Islander Studies (2004–2005). She started her own consulting company Wallis Heritage Consulting in 2011 which provides cultural heritage management services and Indigenous liaison for both government and private sector clients.

== Research ==
Wallis' research interests focus on human-environment relationships through the late Quaternary period, coastal and island archaeology, phytolith analysis, and ethnobotany. She specialises in palaeoenvironmental reconstruction through the analysis of phytoliths and remote area fieldwork, and maintains broad interests in community-based Indigenous archaeology.

She has been worked on projects across most of Western Australia (WA), South Australia (SA), Northern Territory (NT), Australian Capital Territory (ACT) and Queensland (QLD) and has international experience working in Chile, Vietnam and Thailand.

She has been involved in a number of Australian Research Council (ARC) grants across her career and has been awarded more than 40 research grants.

== Awards and honours ==
Wallis has served as President of two peak organisations for archaeologists in Australia, the Australian Archaeological Association and the Australian Association of Consulting Archaeologists.

In 2012, Wallis was awarded life membership for her contribution to the Australian Archaeological Association.

== Select publications ==
- Florin, S.A., A.S. Fairbairn, M. Nango, J. Djandjomerr, B. Marwick, R. Fullagar, M. Smith, L.A. Wallis and C. Clarkson 2020 The first Australian ‘bush foods’ at Madjedbebe, 65,000–53,000 years ago. Nature Communications 11(924).
- Davidson, I., H. Burke, L.A. Wallis, B. Barker, E. Hatte and N. Cole 2018 Connecting Myall Creek and the Wonomo. In J. Lydon and L. Ryan (eds), Remembering the Myall Creek Massacre, pp. 100–111. Sydney: NewSouth Publishing.
- Wallis, L.A. 2018 Chapter 12 Phytolith analysis of sediment samples from Djadjiling (HD07-1A-04), HN-A9 (Jundaru) and HD07-3A-PAD13, Pilbara, Western Australia. In D. Cropper and B. Law (eds), Rockshelter Excavations in the East Hamersley Range, Pilbara Region, Western Australia. British Archaeological Reports International Series, pp359–384. Oxford: Archaeopress Publishing.
- Clarkson, C., Z. Jacobs, B. Marwick, R. Fullagar, L.A. Wallis, M. Smith, R.G. Roberts, E. Hayes, K. Lowe, X. Carah, A. Florin, J. McNeil, D. Cox, L.J. Arnold, Q. Hua, J. Huntley, H.E.A. Brand, T. Manne, A. Fairbairn, J. Shulmeister, L.Lyle, M. Salina, M. Page, K. Connell, G. Park, K. Norman, T. Murphy and C. Pardoe 2017 New evidence for the human colonisation of northern Australia about 65,000 years ago. Nature 547(7663):303–310.
- Connelly, P. and L.A. Wallis 2013 Kar-kar: Mitakoodi Traditional Medicinal Plant Uses of the Cloncurry Region. Mount Isa: Southern Gulf Catchments Ltd.
- Sim, R. and L.A. Wallis 2008 Northern Australian offshore island use during the Holocene: the archaeology of Vanderlin Island, Sir Edward Pellew Group, Gulf of Carpentaria. Australian Archaeology 67:95–106.
- Smith, M., P. Veth, P. Hiscock and L.A. Wallis 2005 Introduction: Global deserts in perspective. In P. Veth, M. Smith and P. Hiscock (eds), Desert Peoples: Archaeological Perspectives, pp. 1–13. Malden: Blackwell Publishers.
- Hiscock, P. and L.A. Wallis 2005 Pleistocene settlement of deserts from an Australian perspective. In P. Veth, M. Smith and P. Hiscock (eds), Desert Peoples: Archaeological Perspectives, pp. 34–57. Malden: Blackwell Publishers.
- Bowdery, D.B., D. Hart, C. Lentfer and L.A. Wallis 2001 A universal phytolith key. In J.D. Meunier and F. Colin (eds), Phytoliths: Applications in Earth Science and Human History, pp. 267–278. Rotterdam: A.A. Balkema Publishers.
- Wallis, L.A. 2001 Environmental history of northwest Australia based on phytolith analysis at Carpenter’s Gap 1. Quaternary International 83–
