= Rhys Jones (archaeologist) =

Welsh-Australian archeologist

- Born: Rhys Maengwyn Jones; 26 February 1941; Blaenau Ffestiniog, Wales
- Died: 19 September 2001 (aged 60); Australia
- Occupation: Archaeologist
- Years active: 1963–2001
- Known for: Tasmanian research

Rhys Maengwyn Jones AO (26 February 1941 – 19 September 2001) was a Welsh-Australian archeologist.

== Biography ==
Jones was born in Blaenau Ffestiniog, Wales and educated at Whitchurch Grammar School, Cardiff. He was an undergraduate at Emmanuel College, Cambridge where Graham Clarke, Eric Higgs and Charles McBurney were his instructors in archaeology. He spoke Welsh fluently.

He arrived in Australia in 1963 to take up a teaching position at the University of Sydney, where he later completed his PhD on Tasmanian Aboriginal archaeology. In 1969 he moved on to the Australian National University where he spent the rest of his career. He was an Honorary Professor of the University of Wales, Newport, and a Fellow of the University of Wales, Lampeter. For one year, he was Australian Visiting Professor at Harvard University.

He was married to fellow archaeologist Betty Meehan, with whom he travelled to Arnhem Land in the 1970s to live alongside and observe the Anbarra people.

He was a key figure in dating the arrival of Aboriginal Australians, first with radiocarbon dating and later with luminescence techniques, and, more generally, in the study of the archeology of Indigenous Australians.

He was credited with naming the Aboriginal practice of "cultural burning" as fire-stick farming.

In the 2002 Queen's Birthday Honours Jones was made an Officer of the Order of Australia for "service to archaeology, particularly in the areas of research and teaching, and as a leader in matters relating to world heritage, conservation and indigenous social justice issues".

== Legacy ==
The Australian Archaeological Association established the Rhys Jones Medal in 2002, to honour Jones. Awarded annually, it is the highest award offered by the Australian Archaeological Association. Notable winners have been John Mulvaney, Isabel McBryde, Harry Lourandos, Mike Smith, Sharon Sullivan, Val Attenbrow, and Anne Clarke (archaeologist).
