= Harry Lourandos =

Australian Archaeologist

- Born: 1945 (age 80–81); Sydney, New South Wales, Australia
- Occupations: Archaeologist, academic
- Years active: 1964–present
- Known for: Study of intensification by Aboriginal Australians

Harry Lourandos (born 1945) is an Australian archaeologist, adjunct professor in the Department of Anthropology, Archaeology and Sociology, School of Arts and Social Sciences at James Cook University, Cairns. He is a leading proponent of the theory that a period of hunter-gatherer intensification occurred between 3000 and 1000 BCE.

== Early life and education ==
Lourandos was born in Sydney in 1945, to migrant parents from the island of Ithaca in western Greece. The family was involved in restaurants and professions in Sydney. He attended Sydney Grammar School and commenced a degree the University of Sydney in 1963, leading to an honours degree followed by a position as Research Archaeologist at the Tasmanian Museum and Art Gallery, the first professional archaeologist appointed at the museum. In 1970 he received a M.A. in prehistory at the Australian National University followed by a PhD. in anthropology at the University of Sydney in 1980.

in 1973 he became a teaching fellow at the Department of Anthropology at the University of Sydney and then in 1979 was a lecturer with the Department of Prehistory at the University of New England. He moved to the University of Queensland in 1986 as senior lecturer in the Department of Anthropology and Sociology.

== Research ==
In 1964–1965 Lourandos undertook archaeological fieldwork in Tasmania with Rhys Jones, who had commenced his own archaeological research in Tasmania the previous year. In 1965 he helped excavate the Rocky Cape South cave site, and recognising the importance of the 5000-year-old sealed site, contacted Jones and subsequently they carried out a detailed survey and excavation. His writing on the Tasmanian highlands, such as at Warragarra rock shelter that he went to in 1968, discusses how Aboriginal Tasmanians inhabited and adapted to the changing climate.

It is for his contribution to the Intensification debate that Lourandos is best known. Intensification involved an increase in human manipulation of the environment (for example, the construction of eel traps in Victoria), population growth, an increase in trade between groups, a more elaborate social structure, and other cultural changes. A shift in stone tool technology, involving the development of smaller and more intricate points and scrapers, occurred around this time. This was probably also associated with the introduction to the mainland of the Australian dingo.

== Select publications ==
- Lourandos, H., B. David, N. Roche, C. Rowe, A. Holden and S.J. Clarke 2012 Hay Cave: A 30,000-year cultural sequence from the Mitchell-Palmer limestone zone, north Queensland (Australia). In S. G. Haberle and B. David (eds), Peopled Landscapes: Archaeological and Biogeographic Approaches to Landscapes. Terra Australis 34. Canberra: ANU E Press.
- Lourandos, H. 2008 Constructing 'hunter-gatherers', constructing 'prehistory': Australia and New Guinea. Australian Archaeology 67:69-78.
- Lourandos, H. 2002 The archaeology of hunter-gatherer society. In The International Encyclopedia of the Social and Behavioural Sciences. Oxford: Elsevier Sciences Limited.
- Lourandos, H. 1997 Continent of Hunter-Gatherers: New Perspectives in Australian Prehistory. Cambridge: Cambridge University Press. ISBN 978-0-521-35946-7
- Lourandos, H. and A. Ross 1994 The great 'intensification debate': Its history and place in Australian archaeology. Australian Archaeology 39:54-63.
- Lourandos, H. 1987 Swamp managers of southwestern Victoria. In D. J. Mulvaney and J. P. White (eds), Australians to 1788, pp. 292–307. Sydney: Fairfax, Syme and Weldon.
- Lourandos, H. 1983 Intensification: A late Pleistocene-Holocene archaeological sequence from southwestern Victoria, Archaeology in Oceania 18(2):81-94.
