= Alexander Gallus =

Australian medical researcher

Alexander (Sandor) Stephen Gallus (born 5 June 1940 in Sopron, Hungary) is a medical researcher in haemostasis and thrombosis, the son of archaeologist Sandor Gallus, and the husband of former Australian politician Chris Gallus. He is Emeritus Professor, Flinders University, former Professor of Haematology, Flinders University School of Medicine and former Director of Pathology Services at Flinders Medical Centre and the Repatriation General Hospital, Adelaide, Australia.

== Selected published works ==
- Agnelli, Giancarlo; Buller, Harry R.; Cohen, Alexander; Curto, Madelyn; Gallus, Alexander S.; Johnson, Margot; Porcari, Anthony; Raskob, Gary E.; Weitz, Jeffrey I. (21 February 2013). "Apixaban for Extended Treatment of Venous Thromboembolism". New England Journal of Medicine. 368 (8): 699–708. doi:10.1056/NEJMoa1207541. hdl:2445/178572. PMID 23216615.
- Agnelli, Giancarlo; Buller, Harry R.; Cohen, Alexander; Curto, Madelyn; Gallus, Alexander S.; Johnson, Margot; Masiukiewicz, Urszula; Pak, Raphael; Thompson, John; Raskob, Gary E.; Weitz, Jeffrey I. (29 August 2013). "Oral Apixaban for the Treatment of Acute Venous Thromboembolism". New England Journal of Medicine. 369 (9): 799–808. doi:10.1056/nejmoa1302507. PMID 23808982.
- EINSTEIN–PE Investigators; Büller, H. R.; Prins, M. H.; Lensin, A. W.; Decousus, H.; Jacobson, B. F.; Minar, E.; Chlumsky, J.; Verhamme, P.; Wells, P.; Agnelli, G.; Cohen, A.; Berkowitz, S. D.; Bounameaux, H.; Davidson, B. L.; Misselwitz, F.; Gallus, A. S.; Raskob, G. E.; Schellong, S.; Segers, A. (5 April 2012). "Oral Rivaroxaban for the Treatment of Symptomatic Pulmonary Embolism". New England Journal of Medicine. 366 (14): 1287–1297. doi:10.1056/nejmoa1113572. PMID 22449293.
- Lassen, Michael Rud; Gallus, Alexander; Raskob, Gary E.; Pineo, Graham; Chen, Dalei; Ramirez, Luz Margarita (23 December 2010). "Apixaban versus Enoxaparin for Thromboprophylaxis after Hip Replacement". New England Journal of Medicine. 363 (26): 2487–2498. doi:10.1056/NEJMoa1006885. PMID 21175312.
- Lassen, Michael Rud; Raskob, Gary E; Gallus, Alexander; Pineo, Graham; Chen, Dalei; Hornick, Philip; ADVANCE-2 investigators (March 2010). "Apixaban versus enoxaparin for thromboprophylaxis after knee replacement (ADVANCE-2): a randomised double-blind trial". The Lancet. 375 (9717): 807–815. doi:10.1016/S0140-6736(09)62125-5. hdl:2328/32382. PMID 20206776. S2CID 45046302.
- The EINSTEIN Investigators (22 December 2010). "Oral Rivaroxaban for Symptomatic Venous Thromboembolism". New England Journal of Medicine. 363 (26): 2499–2510. doi:10.1056/nejmoa1007903. PMID 21128814.
