= Sue O'Connor =

Australian archaeologist

Sue O'Connor FAHA FBA
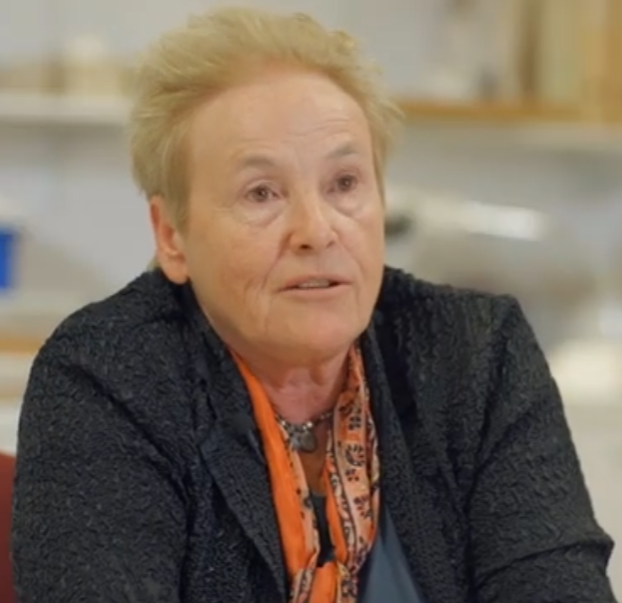
- In an ANU video in 2018
- Born: c. 1960 (age c. 65)
- Education: University of New England (Australia) (1980); University of Western Australia (PhD)
- Awards: Rhys Jones Medal for Outstanding Contribution to Australian Archaeology (2011)
- Scientific career
- Fields: archaeology
- Workplaces: University of Western Australia; Australian National University

Sue O'Connor FAHA FBA (born c. 1960) is an Australian archaeologist and Distinguished Professor in the School of Culture, History & Language at the Australian National University. Her research focuses primarily on the evidence of Pleistocene settlement and early human migration in the Indo-Pacific region.

== Education ==
O'Connor studied archaeology at the University of New England (Australia) and graduated with honours in 1980. She furthered her studies at the University of Western Australia where she received her PhD in 1991.

== Career ==
O'Connor was a lecturer at the University of Western Australia (UWA) from 1991 to 1994. In 1994, she accepted a research fellowship at Australian National University (ANU) in the Department of Archaeology and Natural History. In 2005, she was promoted to the Head of the department and in 2008 was made a full Professor.

O'Connor has conducted archaeological projects in the Northern Territory of Australia, Kimberley (Western Australia) Indonesia, Papua New Guinea and Timor Leste. Her research findings have demonstrated the first evidence of ancient people living in the Kimberley region over 40,000 years ago. Her investigations have also resulted in the earliest indication for rock art production in Australia

=== Important archaeological discoveries ===
==== East Timor Cave ====
O'Connor led a research expedition which discovered a cave site in East Timor, with evidence of people living more than 42,000 years ago. It is "the oldest evidence of occupation by modern humans on the islands that were the stepping stones from South-East Asia to Australia". Prior to O'Connor's research, scholars believed that early humans migrated south from Maritime Southeast Asia to Australia by traveling northwards by means of Borneo and Sulawesi, and then south through Papua New Guinea. With the new research findings, O'Connor believes that early humans traveled south from Maritime Southeast Asia through East Timor to Australia.

==== Canine domestication in East Timor ====
O'Connor worked on a team that conducted research on a dog burial found at Matja Kuru in East Timor. Their findings suggest that humans domesticated dogs at the site as early as 3,000 years ago. Analysis of the remains revealed a number of morphological similarities between modern-day domesticated dogs and the dog found at the burial site. O'Connor and her team assert that the presence of domesticated dogs may indicate that a hunting-foraging way of life was still prevalent at the time.

==== Pleistocene era burial ====
In 2017, O'Connor's research team recovered the world's oldest fish hooks from an ancient burial site on Alor Island, Indonesia. Five circular, rotating hooks, probably used for deep-sea fishing, were found under the chin and around the jaws of an adult female skeleton buried 12,000 years ago. This discovery contradicts the current theory that most fishing activities on the island had been carried out by men. Until 2017, the oldest fish-hooks found with a burial site were unearthed at a river site in Siberia and were determined to be 9,000 years old.

In July 2024, O'Connor was elected as a Corresponding Fellow of the British Academy.

== Publications ==
=== Books ===
- O'Connor, Sue (1999). 30,000 Years of Aboriginal Occupation: Kimberley, North West Australia (Terra Australis, 14). Australian National University. p. 155. ISBN 978-0731546220.
- O'Connor, Sue; Fairbairn, Andrew (2012). New Directions in Archaeological Science (Terra Australis) (Volume 28). Australian National University. p. 274. ISBN 978-1921536489.
- O'Connor, Sue (2013). Transcending the Culture-Nature Divide in Cultural Heritage (Terra Australis 36): Views from the Asia–Pacific region (Volume 36). Australian National University. p. 254. ISBN 978-1922144041.

=== Articles ===
- O'Connor, Sue; S. Balm & S. Fyfe (2013). "Marking resistance? Change and continuity in the recent rock art of the southern Kimberly, Australia". Antiquity. 87 (336): 539–554. doi:10.1017/S0003598X00049115. S2CID 163092229.
- O'Connor, Sue; P. Tacon & N. Tan (2014). "The global implications of the early surviving rock art of greater Southeast Asia". Antiquity. 88 (342): 1050–1064. doi:10.1017/S0003598X00115315. S2CID 162124948.
- O'Connor, Sue & M. Langley (2015). "6500-Year-old Nassarius shell appliques in Timor-Leste: technological and use wear analyses". Journal of Archaeological Science. 62: 175–192. doi:10.1016/j.jas.2015.06.012.
- O'Connor, Sue; M. Mahirta & S. Samper Carro (2017). "Fishing in life and death: Pleistocene fish-hooks from a burial context on Alor Island, Indonesia". Antiquity. 360 (91): 1451–1468. doi:10.15184/aqy.2017.186. hdl:1885/237927.
- O'Connor, Sue; J. Louys & S. Samper Carro (2017). "Hominin Dispersal and Settlement East of the Huxley's Line: The role of sea level changes, island size, and subsistence behaviour". Current Anthropology. 58 (17): 567–582. doi:10.1086/694252. hdl:1885/218101. S2CID 148643129.
- O'Connor, Sue; Jane Balme; Ursula Frederick; et al. (December 2022). "Art in the bark : Indigenous carved boab trees (Adansonia gregorii) in north-west Australia". Antiquity. 96 (390): 1574–1591. doi:10.15184/aqy.2022.129.

== Awards ==
- 1999–2003 Australian Research Council QEII Fellowship
- 2007 elected Fellow, Australian Academy of the Humanities (FAHA)
- 2011 Rhys Jones Medal for Outstanding Contribution to Australian Archaeology
- 2012 Australian Research Council Laureate Fellowship
- 2018 ANU Vice-Chancellor's Award for Excellence in Research
- 2024 elected as a Fellow of the British Academy
