= Australian Association of Consulting Archaeologists =

Professional organization of archaeologists

The Australian Association of Consulting Archaeologists Inc. (AACAI) is the professional body established in 1979 with presently about 90 full members, to represent professional archaeologists. It is a foundation member of the Council for the Humanities, Arts and Social Sciences, is affiliated with the Australian Archaeological Association Inc. and awards the annual Laila Haglund Prize for Excellence in Consultancy.

The association publishes the AACAI Newsletter and AACAI Monograph Series of reports on members' work.
