= Anthropological Index Online =

- Producer: Royal Anthropological Institute of Great Britain and Ireland (United Kingdom)

Access
- Providers: EBSCO Publishing
- Cost: Free (individuals), subscription (institutions)

Coverage
- Disciplines: Anthropology
- Record depth: Index
- Format coverage: Journal, trade & magazine articles
- Temporal coverage: 1957–present

Print edition
- Print title: Anthropological Index
- ISSN: 0003-5467

Links
- Website: aio.therai.org.uk
- Title list(s): aio.therai.org.uk/aio.php?action=searchjournals

The Anthropological Index Online is an academic journal indexing service for anthropology.

== Overview ==
The service indexes the journals received by The Anthropology Library at The British Museum (formerly at the Museum of Mankind), which receives periodicals in all branches of anthropology from academic institutions and publishers around the world. It is a collaboration between the Royal Anthropological Institute of Great Britain and Ireland and the Anthropology Department at the University of Kent. It is also available under licence from EBSCO Information Services as part of Anthropology Plus.

There are several hundred thousand records to date, the earliest from the late 1950s. Subject coverage is cultural anthropology/social anthropology, physical anthropology, archaeology and linguistics. The index is regularly updated.

== See also ==
- List of academic databases and search engines
