= John Mulvaney =

Australian archaeologist

- Born: Derek John Mulvaney; 26 October 1925; Yarram, Victoria, Australia
- Died: 21 September 2016 (aged 90); Canberra, ACT
- Occupation: Archaeologist
- Years active: 1956–1996
- Known for: "Father of Australian archaeology"
- Notable work: Fromm's Landing excavation

Derek John Mulvaney AO CMG FAHA (26 October 1925 – 21 September 2016), known as John Mulvaney and D. J. Mulvaney, was an Australian archaeologist. He was the first qualified archaeologist to focus his work on Australia.

== Life ==
Mulvaney was born in Yarram, Victoria, on 26 October 1925.

He began his academic career at the University of Melbourne in Roman history, writing an MA thesis on State and Society in Britain at the time of Roman conquest. In consciously preparing himself to begin the field of Australian archaeology, he entered Clare College, Cambridge as an undergraduate, studying British, Irish, German and Danish prehistoric archaeology. He obtained his PhD from Cambridge in 1970.

His first excavation in Australia was at Fromm's Landing (Tungawa) on the Murray River in South Australia, from 1956 to 1960.

During his academic career, he co-authored and/or edited 17 books. He was for many years a Commissioner of the Australian Heritage Commission. He was elected a Fellow of the Australian Academy of the Humanities in 1969, the year of its foundation, serving on its Council from 1972 to 1974 and again, this time as Honorary Secretary, from 1989 to 1996.

Mulvaney died in Canberra at the age of 90 on 21 September 2016.

== Legacy ==
Known as the "father of Australian archaeology", Mulvaney was the "first university-trained archaeologist to make Australia his field of study".

In March 2019 the Australian Academy of the Humanities launched the John Mulvaney Fellowship for Aboriginal and Torres Strait Islander early career researchers working in the humanities.

The John Mulvaney Book Award was established by the Australian Archaeological Association in 2004 in honour of Mulvaney, "to acknowledge the significant contribution of individual or coauthored publications to Australian archaeology, either as general knowledge or as specialist publications". In 2018, Deep Time Dreaming: Uncovering Ancient Australia by Billy Griffiths (which describes some of Mulvaney's work and applauds the way he "[built] bridges between the disciplines of history and archaeology") won the award. Alice Gorman's Dr Space Junk vs the Universe: Archaeology and the Future won the award in 2019. In 2022 Debbie Argue won the award for Little Species, Big Mystery: The story of Homo floresiensis.

== Awards ==
- Fellow of the Australian Academy of the Humanities, 1969
- Companion of the Order of St Michael and St George (CMG), 1982 Birthday Honours
- Officer of the Order of Australia (AO), 1991
- Grahame Clark Medal of the British Academy, 1999
- Centenary Medal, 2001
- Rhys Jones Medal, 2004

== Works ==
=== Theory of Complex Cultures ===
In 1929 on the Murray River was Devon Downs which answered John Mulvaney’s theory of complex cultures and societies of Aboriginal people. The excavation was done by Norman Tindale who found several layers of evidence of cultural change. Mulvaney himself was brought to a site ten kilometers away from Devon Downs where tall limestone cliffs hung over a sandy floor called Fromm’s Landing.

=== Fromm’s Landing ===
The start of Mulvaney's fieldwork began at Fromm’s Landing in 1956. Returning to the site in 1958, his findings had challenged historical and anthropologists to accept Aboriginal history and archeological records. The excavation work was used to support the date people originated in Australia. He later wrote "Proceeding of the Prehistoric Society" in 1961 which still went against the general historic ideas with the new concept of culture to not be dismissed. Fromm’s landing has evolved into a training site for future archeologists to learn. Mulvaney worked on another site with Herbert Tindale which differed in societal and cultural succession from Fromm’s Landing meaning to understand time and stone tools, there needed to be more diverse measuring techniques.

=== Victoria ===
With his team in 1957, Mulvaney went to Glenelg River in Victoria with the primary focus on stratified cave deposits. His work led to the use of systemic field work and reporting methods which the change additionally influenced the Aboriginal conservation in Victoria. Located on the Otway coast, Glen Aire Mulvaney worked on two shelters to accumulate more fieldwork in Victoria. The remains of an Aboriginal man were found in the upper deposit of the shelter which Mulvaney concluded to be a Gundbanud man in the 1840’s.

=== Kenniff Cave ===
Located in eastern central Queensland, Kenniff Cave is a sandstone shelter with a 1.0 meter by 1.2 meter deposit which was later changed to a 1.0 meter by 1.4 meter deposit. Mulvaney and his partner Bernie Joyce changed the deposit depth due to the site’s loose and sandy surface as it became an issue in measuring the stratigraphy of artifacts. His conclusion after excavating a variety of tools in the same sediment was that additional types of tools were used 5000 and 25000 years ago, Mulvaney has greatly contributed towards the stratigraphic effort of Kenniff Cave in providing the data and photographing the site.

=== Political Activism ===
As more archeological works began to be published, a problem arose to Mulvaney. Aboriginal people became overshadowed from the European and historical ideals leading to "the lack of Aboriginal representation." This began his political activism journey and in Glenelg River, it was made clear of the importance of stratified cave deposits to promote the conservation of Aboriginal antiques. At the start of his career Australia was viewed as simple and ideas were rigid with no representation of Aboriginal archeology. Becoming an activist after contributing to the archeological record himself was a way for him to solve this issue.
