= Archaeology in Oceania =

Peer-reviewed academic journal

- Discipline: Archaeology, anthropology
- Language: English
- Edited by: J. Peter White

Publication details
- Former names: Archaeology & Physical Anthropology in Oceania
- History: 1966–present
- Publisher: Wiley-Blackwell
- Frequency: Triannually
- Impact factor: 0.645 (2014)

Standard abbreviations
- ISO 4: Archaeol. Ocean.

Indexing
- ISSN: 0003-8121 (print); 1834-4453 (web)
- OCLC no.: 1481829

Links
- Journal homepage; Online access; Online archive

Archaeology in Oceania is a triannual peer-reviewed academic journal covering prehistoric and historic archaeology, especially concerning Australia, the islands of the Pacific Ocean, and the western Pacific Rim. The journal is published by Wiley-Blackwell on behalf of Oceania Publications. It was originally published by the University of Sydney. The editor-in-chief is J. Peter White. It is indexed in Anthropological Literature, Scopus, Arts and Humanities Citation Index, and Social Sciences Citation Index.

The journal is associated with Oceania, published by the same publisher and covering ethnographic research in the area.
