= Australian Archaeology =

Peer-reviewed academic journal

- Discipline: Archaeology
- Language: English
- Edited by: Sean Ulm and Annie Ross

Publication details
- History: 1974-present
- Publisher: Australian Archaeological Association (Australia)
- Frequency: Triannual

Standard abbreviations
- ISO 4: Aust. Archaeol.

Indexing
- ISSN: 0312-2417 (print); 2470-0363 (web)
- LCCN: sn87015931
- OCLC no.: 762014461

Links
- Journal homepage

Australian Archaeology is a peer-reviewed academic journal published by the Australian Archaeological Association. It was established in 1974 and covers all fields of archaeology as well as other subjects that are relevant to archaeological research and practice in Australia and nearby areas. The journal uses a broad definition of archaeology to include prehistoric, historic, and contemporary periods and includes social, biological, and cultural anthropology, history, Aboriginal studies, environmental science, and other related areas. As of December 2021 the editors are Sean Ulm and Annie Ross assisted by associate editor Ariana Lambrides and book review editor Mirani Litster.

== Abstracting and indexing ==
The journal is abstracted and indexed in:

- Australian Public Affairs Information Service (APAIS, now part of Informit database)
- Arts and Humanities Citation Index
- Scopus
- Anthropological Literature
- Anthropological Index Online
- Social Sciences Citation Index
- Current Contents/Social & Behavioral Sciences
- Current Contents/Arts & Humanities
- The Zoological Record
