= Journal of Archaeological Science =

Peer-reviewed academic journal

- Discipline: Archaeology
- Language: English
- Edited by: Marcos Martinón-Torres, Efthymia Nikita

Publication details
- History: 1974–present
- Publisher: Elsevier
- Frequency: Monthly
- Open access: Hybrid
- Impact factor: 3.030 (2018)

Standard abbreviations
- ISO 4: J. Archaeol. Sci.

Indexing
- CODEN: JASCDU
- ISSN: 0305-4403 (print); 1095-9238 (web)
- LCCN: 74647523
- OCLC no.: 1795941

Links
- Journal homepage; Online access

The Journal of Archaeological Science is a monthly peer-reviewed academic journal that covers "the development and application of scientific techniques and methodologies to all areas of archaeology". The journal was established in 1974 by Academic Press and is currently published by Elsevier.

== Abstracting and indexing ==
The journal is abstracted and indexed in:

- Academic Search
- FRANCIS
- Biological Abstracts
- GeoRef
- GEOBASE
- Scopus
- Anthropological Index Online
- Arts & Humanities Citation Index
- BIOSIS Previews
- Current Contents
- Science Citation Index Expanded
- Social Sciences Citation Index
- The Zoological Record

According to the Journal Citation Reports, the journal has a 2018 impact factor of 3.030.
