= Australian Archaeological Association =

Archaeological organisation in Australia

The Australian Archaeological Association (AAA) is an archaeological organisation in Australia. Membership is open to anyone interested in furthering archaeology in Australia.

Sometimes referred to by the nickname Triple A, the association was founded in 1973 at a meeting held during the Australian and New Zealand Association for the Advancement of Science (ANZAAS) Congress in Perth, Western Australia, following earlier discussions during the 1972 Australian Institute of Aboriginal Studies General Meeting, and the ANZAAS Congress held in Sydney later that year.

The association's aim is to further archaeology in Australia with the stated purpose:

to promote the advancement of archaeology; to provide an organisation for the discussion and dissemination of archaeological information and ideas; to convene meetings at regular intervals; to publicise the need for the study and conservation of archaeological sites and collections; and, to publicise the work of the Association.

== Journal and annual conference ==
The association has published the journal Australian Archaeology since 1974. It was originally published as a newsletter for the association and gradually became a peer-reviewed academic journal. It is currently published by Taylor & Francis.

AAA hosts an annual conference for its members that rotates around Australian cities. During the annual conference four major awards are generally bestowed:

- Rhys Jones Medal for Outstanding Contribution to Australian Archaeology (established in 2002 in honour of Rhys Jones)
- Life Membership for Outstanding Contribution to the Australian Archaeological Association
- Bruce Veitch Award for Excellence in Indigenous Engagement
- John Mulvaney Book Award (established in 2004 in honour of John Mulvaney)

=== National Archaeology Week ===
The AAA supports the "National Archaeology Week", which is an annual week long series of events that aims to increase public awareness of Australian archaeology and the work of Australian archaeologists both at home and abroad, and to promote the importance of protecting Australia's unique archaeological heritage. Beginning on the third Sunday in May every year, the program of events and activities includes public lectures, seminars, exhibits, demonstration excavations and displays.
