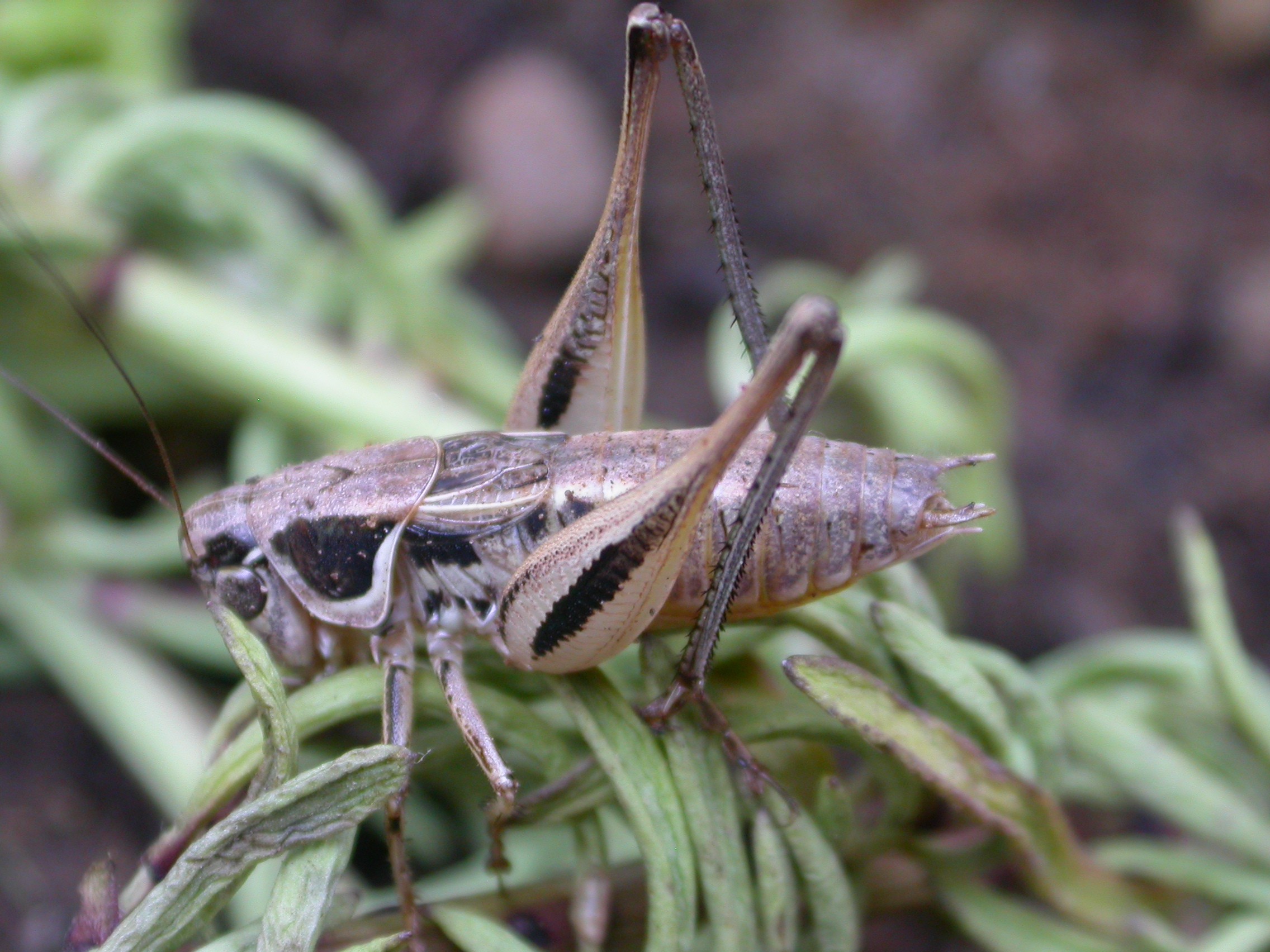
- Incertana drepanensis

Scientific classification
- Domain: Eukaryota
- Kingdom: Animalia
- Phylum: Arthropoda
- Class: Insecta
- Order: Orthoptera
- Suborder: Ensifera
- Family: Tettigoniidae
- Tribe: Platycleidini
- Genus: Incertana; Zeuner, 1941

Synonyms
- Decorana Zeuner, 1941

= Incertana =

Genus of cricket-like animals

External image
- Images at iNaturalist

Incertana is a genus of bush crickets in the tribe Platycleidini, erected by F. E. Zeuner in 1941. Species have been recorded (probably an incomplete distribution) from: North Africa, southern Europe (the Iberian Peninsula, Sicily, the Balkans through to Turkey), the Middle East and the Himalayas. Placed in genus group Platycleis, literature on the type species and others often refers to that genus.

== Species ==
The Orthoptera Species File lists the following:

1. Incertana arabica (Popov, 1981)
2. Incertana buxtoni (Uvarov, 1923)
3. Incertana capitata (Uvarov, 1917)
4. Incertana concinna (Walker, 1869)
5. Incertana decorata (Fieber, 1853)
6. Incertana drepanensis (Massa, Fontana & Buzzetti, 2006)
7. Incertana himalayana (Ramme, 1933)
8. Incertana incerta (Brunner von Wattenwyl, 1882) - type species (as Platycleis incerta Brunner von Wattenwyl)
9. Incertana kabyla (Finot, 1893)
10. Incertana persica (Uvarov, 1917)
11. Incertana seniae (Finot, 1893)
12. Incertana tripolitana (Fontana & Massa, 2009)
