= Sporadiana =

Scientific classification
- Domain: Eukaryota
- Kingdom: Animalia
- Phylum: Arthropoda
- Class: Insecta
- Order: Orthoptera
- Suborder: Ensifera
- Family: Tettigoniidae
- Subfamily: Tettigoniinae
- Tribe: Platycleidini
- Genus: Sporadiana; Zeuner, 1941
- Species: S. sporadarum

Binomial name
- Sporadiana sporadarum (Werner, 1933)

Synonyms
- Metrioptera brevipes Uvarov, 1934 (holotype); Platycleis sporadarum Werner, 1933 (syntype)

Genus of insect

Sporadiana is a monotypic genus of southern European bush crickets in the tribe Platycleidini and genus group Platycleis, erected by erected by Frederick Everard Zeuner in 1941.

== Species ==
The Orthoptera Species File includes the single species Sporadiana sporadarum (Werner, 1933), which Franz Werner originally placed in the genus Platycleis. This species has been called the “Sporades Bush-cricket” and has been recorded from Greece and Turkey.
