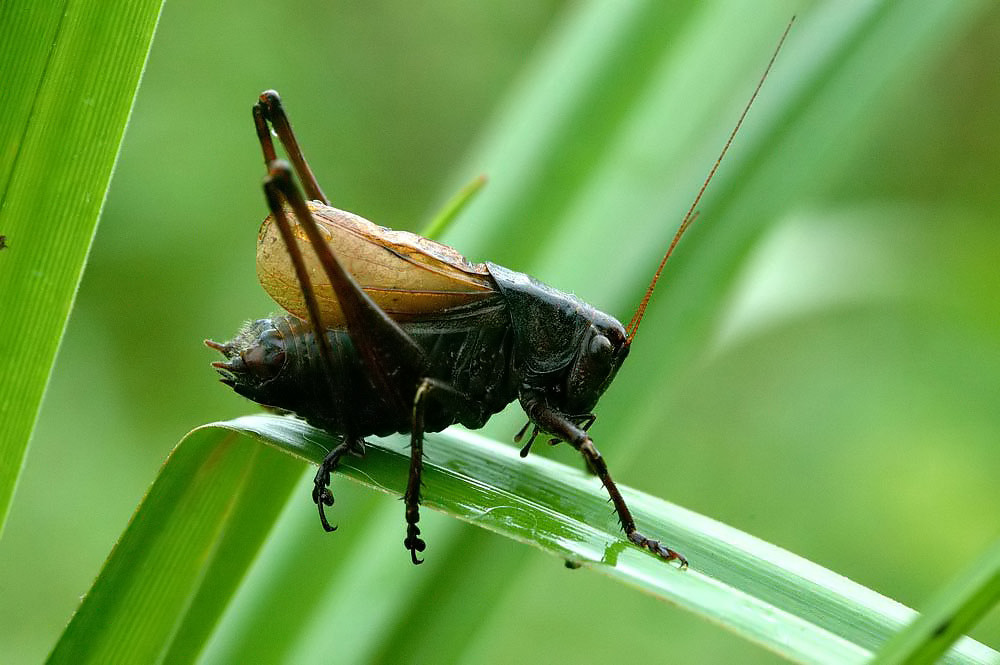
- Zeuneriana marmorata

Scientific classification
- Domain: Eukaryota
- Kingdom: Animalia
- Phylum: Arthropoda
- Class: Insecta
- Order: Orthoptera
- Suborder: Ensifera
- Family: Tettigoniidae
- Subfamily: Tettigoniinae
- Tribe: Platycleidini
- Genus: Zeuneriana; Ramme, 1951

= Zeuneriana =

Genus of cricket-like animals

External image
- Images at iNaturalist

Zeuneriana is a genus of Palaearctic bush crickets in the tribe Platycleidini and now placed in the genus group Metrioptera F. E. Zeuner: after whom it was named by W. Ramme in 1951. The recorded distribution of species is: mainland (especially southern and eastern) Europe, from Spain and France (especially the Pyrenees) through to the Balkans and Romania.

== Species ==
The Orthoptera Species File lists:

1. Zeuneriana abbreviata (Serville, 1838)
2. Zeuneriana amplipennis (Brunner von Wattenwyl, 1882)
3. Zeuneriana burriana (Uvarov, 1935)
4. Zeuneriana marmorata (Fieber, 1853) - type species (as Platycleis marmorata Fieber by subsequent designation)
