= Parnassiana =

Scientific classification
- Domain: Eukaryota
- Kingdom: Animalia
- Phylum: Arthropoda
- Class: Insecta
- Order: Orthoptera
- Suborder: Ensifera
- Family: Tettigoniidae
- Subfamily: Tettigoniinae
- Tribe: Platycleidini
- Genus: Parnassiana; Zeuner, 1941

Genus of cricket-like insects

External image
- Images at iNaturalist

Parnassiana is a genus of bush crickets in the tribe Platycleidini and genus group Platycleis, erected by F. E. Zeuner in 1941. Species have been called "Greek bush-crickets" and members of this genus have been recorded mostly from that country.

== Habitat and life cycle ==
Grecian species such as P. chelmos and P. fusca often live in upland (1200-2300 m.) pastures and with thorny, low-growing shrubs such as Astragalus spp., often perched in these, rather than near the ground. Adults can typically be found between July and October. Several species are locally endemic: for example, P. fusca is only found on Mount Taygetos in the southern Peloponnese.

== Species ==
The Orthoptera Species File lists the following:

1. Parnassiana chelmos (Zeuner, 1941) (3 subspecies)
2. Parnassiana coracis (Ramme, 1921)
3. Parnassiana dirphys (Willemse, 1980)
4. Parnassiana fusca (Brunner von Wattenwyl, 1882)
5. Parnassiana gionica (La Greca & Messina, 1976)
6. Parnassiana menalon (Willemse, 1975)
7. Parnassiana nigromarginata (Willemse & Willemse, 1987)
8. Parnassiana panaetolikon (Willemse, 1980)
9. Parnassiana parnassica (Ramme, 1926) - type species (as Metrioptera parnassica Ramme)
10. Parnassiana parnon (Willemse, 1980)
11. Parnassiana tenuis (Heller & Willemse, 1989)
12. Parnassiana tymphiensis (Willemse, 1973)
13. Parnassiana tymphrestos (Zeuner, 1941)
