= Juliet Clutton-Brock =

British zoologist

- Born: 6 September 1933
- Died: 21 September 2015 (aged 82)
- Education: Runton Hill School; Institute of Archaeology, University of London; Chelsea College of Science and Technology
- Spouse: Peter Jewell (m. 1958; died 1998)
- Children: Three
- Awards: Fellow of the Society of Antiquaries of London; Fellow of the Zoological Society of London
- Scientific career
- Fields: Zooarchaeology
- Workplaces: Natural History Museum
- Thesis: (1962)
- Doctoral advisor: Frederick Zeuner

Juliet Clutton-Brock, FSA, FZS (6 September 1933 – 21 September 2015) was an English zooarchaeologist and curator, specialising in domesticated mammals. From 1969 to 1993, she worked at the Natural History Museum. Between 1999 and 2006, she was the managing editor of the Journal of Zoology.

== Early life ==
Clutton-Brock was born on 6 September 1933 in London. She was the daughter of Alan Clutton-Brock (1904-1976), an art critic of The Times and Slade Professor of Fine Art at Cambridge, and his first wife, Sheelah Mabel Stoney Archer. In 1936, she and her brother were sent to Southern Rhodesia (now Zimbabwe) to live with an aunt after the death of their mother in a car-accident. There, her brother died from polio. Juliet enjoyed the wildlife in her aunt's garden, but was terrified of snakes. Having returned to England after the end of the war in 1945, she was educated at Runton Hill School, an all-girls private boarding school in Norfolk described as "icy" by Caroline Grigson. There she developed an interest in paleontology and studied the fossils in the nearby sea-cliffs.

In 1953, she took a course on Archaeological Techniques at the Institute of Archaeology, then an independent Institute and part of the University of London. Professor Frederick Zeuner, then Professor of Environmental Archaeology at the Institute of Archaeology and one of the founders of zoo-archaeology recommended that she take a degree in zoology before undertaking further study in zooarchaeology. She therefore studied zoology at the Chelsea College of Science and Technology and graduated with a first class Bachelor of Science (BSc) degree. She returned to the Institute of Archaeology to undertake post-graduate study in zooarchaeology under Zeuner. She completed her Doctor of Philosophy (PhD) degree in 1962 with a thesis on "mammalian faunas from sites in India and western Asia". She also attended lectures by Gordon Childe, Kathleen Kenyon and Max Mallowan, which gave her a solid background in the archaeology of Central Europe and the Middle East. Her father had inherited Chastleton House in the Cotswolds (built in 1603) in 1955, and Clutton-Brock would spend her vacations there.

== Career ==
Clutton-Brock obtained part-time employment at the Natural History Museum and was a full-time senior research worker in the Mammal Section at the Natural History Museum, London from 1969 until her retirement in 1993, subsequently maintaining a position there as a research associate. She acted as an editor of the Journal of Zoology from 1994, and its managing editor between 1999 and 2006. In 1976, Clutton-Brock became a member of the executive committee of the International Council for Archaeozoology during a meeting of the UISPP in Nice, and in 1982 organised a meeting of the International Council for Archaeozoology at the Institute of Archaeology on London together with Caroline Grigson.

She published more than 90 scientific reports, papers, books and popular articles on zooarchaeology and the history of domesticated mammals. Her most popular books include A Natural History of Domesticated Mammals (Cambridge University Press) and the Cat, Dog, and Horse volumes of the Eyewitness Books series (DK Publishing). Other works include Horse Power: A History of the Horse and the Donkey in Human Societies (Harvard University Press) and Cats: Ancient and Modern (also Harvard University Press). Her "Natural History of Domesticated Mammals" became the standard text-book for most zoo-archaeology courses in the UK and abroad.

== Personal life ==
Clutton-Brock married Peter Jewell (1925-1998), also a biologist and interested in zoo-archaeology, in 1958. Together, they had three daughters; Sarah, Rebecca and Topsy. In 1966, when Jewell was made Professor of Biological Sciences at the University of Nigeria, the family moved to Nsukka. They had to flee across the Niger in 1967 during the Biafran war. Jewell died in 1998.

== Honours ==
Clutton-Brock was elected a Fellow of the Society of Antiquaries of London (FSA) on 3 May 1979. She was also an elected Fellow of the Zoological Society of London (FZS). Anneke Clason, Sebastian Payne and Hans-Peter Uerpmann published a festschrift in her honour in 1993, entitled Skeletons in Her Cupboard.

== Selected works ==
- Clutton-Brock, Juliet (1965). Excavations at Langhnaj, 1944-63: Part 2: The fauna. Poona: Deccan College Postgraduate and Research Institute.
- Brothwell, D. R.; Thomas, K. D.; Clutton-Brock, Juliet, eds. (1978). Research problems in zooarchaeology. London: Institute of Archaeology. ISBN 978-0905853079.
- Clutton-Brock, Juliet (1981). Domesticated animals from early times. Austin: University of Texas Press. ISBN 978-0292715325.
- Clutton-Brock, Juliet (1987). A natural history of domesticated mammals (1st ed.). Cambridge: Cambridge University Press. ISBN 978-0521346979.
- Clutton-Brock, Juliet (1988). The British Museum book of cats: ancient and modern. London: British Museum Publications. ISBN 978-0714116648.
- Clutton-Brock, Juliet, ed. (1988). The Walking larder: patterns of domestication, pastoralism, and predation. London: Unwin Hyman. ISBN 978-0044450139.
- Hall, Stephen J.G.; Clutton-Brock, Juliet (1989). Two hundred years of British farm Livestock. London: British Museum. ISBN 978-0565010775.
- Clutton-Brock, Juliet (1992). Horse power: a history of the horse and the donkey in human societies. Cambridge, Massachusetts: Harvard University Press. ISBN 978-0674406469.
- Clutton-Brock, Juliet (1992). Horse. London: DK Publishing. ISBN 978-0863187902.
- Clutton-Brock, Juliet (1999). A natural history of domesticated mammals (2nd ed.). Cambridge: Cambridge University Press. ISBN 978-0521632478.
- Clutton-Brock, Juliet (2004). Cat. New York: DK Publishing. ISBN 978-0756606626.
- Clutton-Brock, Juliet (2004). Dog. London: DK Publishing. ISBN 978-0756606787.
- Clutton-Brock, Juliet (2012). Animals as domesticates: a world view through history. East Lansing: Michigan State University Press. ISBN 978-1611860283.
