= Belinfante–Rosenfeld stress–energy tensor =

Modified stress-energy tensor in general relativity

In mathematical physics, the Belinfante–Rosenfeld tensor is a modification of the stress–energy tensor that is constructed from the canonical stress–energy tensor and the spin current so as to be symmetric yet still conserved. It is named after Frederik Belinfante and Léon Rosenfeld who published independently in 1940.

In a classical or quantum local field theory, the generator of Lorentz transformations can be written as an integral

$$M_{\mu\nu} = \int \mathrm{d}^3x \, {M^0}_{\mu\nu}$$

of a local current

$${M^\mu}_{\nu\lambda}= (x_\nu {T^\mu}_\lambda - x_\lambda {T^\mu}_\nu)+ {S^\mu}_{\nu\lambda}.$$

Here ${T^\mu}_\lambda$ is the canonical stress–energy tensor satisfying $\partial_\mu {T^\mu}_{\lambda}=0$, and ${S^{\mu}}_{\nu\lambda}$ is the contribution of the intrinsic (spin) angular momentum. The anti-symmetry

$${M^\mu}_{\nu\lambda} = -{M^\mu}_{\lambda\nu}$$

implies the anti-symmetry

$${S^\mu}_{\nu\lambda} = -{S^\mu}_{\lambda\nu}.$$

Local conservation of angular momentum

$$\partial_\mu {M^\mu}_{\nu\lambda}=0 \,$$

requires that

$$\partial_\mu {S^\mu}_{\nu\lambda}=T_{\lambda\nu}-T_{\nu\lambda}.$$

Thus a source of spin-current implies a non-symmetric canonical stress–energy tensor.

The Belinfante–Rosenfeld tensor is a modification of the stress–energy tensor

$$T_B^{\mu\nu} = T^{\mu\nu} +\frac 12 \partial_\lambda(S^{\mu\nu\lambda}+S^{\nu\mu\lambda}-S^{\lambda\nu\mu})$$

that is constructed from the canonical stress–energy tensor and the spin current ${S^{\mu}}_{\nu\lambda}$ so as to be symmetric yet still conserved, i.e.,

$$\partial_\mu T_B^{\mu\nu} = 0.$$

An integration by parts shows that

$$M^{\nu\lambda} = \int (x^\nu T^{0\lambda}_B - x^\lambda T^{0\nu}_B) \, \mathrm{d}^3x,$$

and so a physical interpretation of Belinfante tensor is that it includes the "bound momentum" associated with gradients of the intrinsic angular momentum. In other words, the added term is an analogue of the ${\mathbf J}_\text{bound}= \nabla\times \mathbf {M}$ "bound current" associated with a magnetization density ${\mathbf M}$.

The curious combination of spin-current components required to make $T_B^{\mu\nu}$ symmetric and yet still conserved seems totally ad hoc, but it was shown by both Rosenfeld and Belinfante that the modified tensor is precisely the symmetric Hilbert stress–energy tensor that acts as the source of gravity in general relativity. Just as it is the sum of the bound and free currents that acts as a source of the magnetic field, it is the sum of the bound and free energy–momentum that acts as a source of gravity.

== Belinfante–Rosenfeld and the Hilbert energy–momentum tensor ==
The Hilbert energy–momentum tensor $T_{\mu\nu}$ is defined by the variation of the action functional $S_{\rm eff}$ with respect to the metric as

$$\delta S_{\rm eff}=\frac 12 \int d^nx \sqrt{g} \,T_{\mu\nu}\,\delta g^{\mu\nu},$$

or equivalently as

$$\delta S_{\rm eff}=-\frac 12 \int d^nx \sqrt{g} \,T^{\mu\nu}\,\delta g_{\mu\nu}.$$

(The minus sign in the second equation arises because $\delta g^{\mu\nu}= - g^{\mu\sigma} \delta g_{\sigma\tau} g^{\tau\nu}$ because $\delta(g^{\mu\sigma}g_{\sigma\tau})=0.$)

We may also define an energy–momentum tensor $T_{cb}$ by varying a Minkowski-orthonormal vierbein ${\bf e}_a$ to get

$$\delta S_{\rm eff}=  \int d^nx\sqrt{g}\left( \frac{\delta S}{\delta e^\mu_a}\right) \delta e^\mu_a  \equiv  \int d^nx\sqrt{g} \left(T_{cb} \eta^{ca} e^{*b}_\mu\right) \delta e^\mu_a.$$

Here $\eta_{ab} = {\bf e}_a \cdot {\bf e}_b$ is the Minkowski metric for the orthonormal vierbein frame, and ${\bf e}^{*b}$ are the covectors dual to the vierbeins.

With the vierbein variation there is no immediately obvious reason for $T_{cb}$ to be symmetric. However, the action functional $S_{\rm eff}({\bf e}_a)$ should be invariant under an infinitesimal local Lorentz transformation $\delta e^\mu_a= e^\mu_b {\theta^{b}}_a(x)$, $\theta^{ab}=-\theta^{ba}$, and so

$$\delta S_{\rm eff}
=   \int d^nx\sqrt{g} \,T_{cb}\,\eta^{ca} e^{*b}_\mu e^\mu_d {\theta^d}_a
=  \int d^nx\sqrt{g} \,T_{cb}\,\eta^{ca}  {\theta^b}_a
=  \int d^nx\sqrt{g}\, T_{cb}\, \theta^{bc}(x),$$

should be zero. As $\theta^{bc}(x)$ is an arbitrary position-dependent skew symmetric matrix, we see that local Lorentz and rotation invariance both requires and implies that $T_{bc}=T_{cb}$.

Once we know that $T_{ab}$ is symmetric, it is easy to show that $T_{ab}= e_a^\mu e_b^\nu T_{\mu\nu}$, and so the vierbein-variation energy–momentum tensor is equivalent to the metric-variation Hilbert tensor.

We can now understand the origin of the Belinfante–Rosenfeld modification of the Noether canonical energy momentum tensor. Take the action to be $S_{\rm eff}({\bf e}_a, {\omega}^{ab}_\mu )$ where ${\omega}^{ab}_\mu$ is the spin connection that is determined by ${\bf e}_a$ via the condition of being metric compatible and torsion free. The spin current ${S^\mu}_{ab}$ is then defined by the variation

$${S^\mu}_{ab}= \frac{2}{\sqrt g} \left.\left(\frac{\delta S_{\rm eff}}{\delta \omega^{ab}_\mu}\right)\right|_{{\bf e}_a}$$

the vertical bar denoting that the ${\bf e}_a$ are held fixed during the variation. The "canonical" Noether energy momentum tensor $T^{(0)}_{cb}$ is the part that arises from the variation where we keep the spin connection fixed:

$$T_{cb} ^{(0)}  \eta^{ca} e^{*b}_\mu= \frac{1}{\sqrt{g}}\left.\left(\frac{\delta S_{\rm eff}}{\delta e^\mu_a}\right)\right|_{\omega^{ab}_\mu}.$$

Then

$$\delta S_{\rm eff} = \int d^nx \sqrt{g} \left\{ T_{cb} ^{(0)}  \eta^{ca} e^{*b}_\mu  \delta e^\mu_a+ \frac 12 {S^{\mu}}_{ab} \delta {\omega^{ab}}_\mu\right\}.$$

Now, for a torsion-free and metric-compatible connection, we have that

$$(\delta \omega_{ij\mu}) e^\mu_k
=-\frac 12\left\{(\nabla_j \delta e_{ik} -  \nabla_k  \delta e_{ij})
+( \nabla_k \delta e_{ji}- \nabla_i  \delta e_{jk}) -( \nabla_i \delta e_{kj}-\nabla_j \delta e_{ki})\right\},$$

where we are using the notation

$$\delta e_{ij} =  {\bf e}_i\cdot \delta {\bf e}_j= \eta_{ib}[e^{*b}_\alpha \delta e_j^\alpha].$$

Using the spin-connection variation, and after an integration by parts, we find

$$\delta S_{\rm eff} = \int d^nx \sqrt{g} \left\{ T_{cb} ^{(0)} +\frac 12 \nabla_a({S_{bc}}^a+{S_{cb}}^a-{S^a}_{bc})\right\}  \eta^{cd}e^{*b}_\mu \,\delta e_d^\mu.$$

Thus we see that corrections to the canonical Noether tensor that appear in the Belinfante–Rosenfeld tensor occur because we need to simultaneously vary the vierbein and the spin connection if we are to preserve local Lorentz invariance.

As an example, consider the classical Lagrangian for the Dirac field

$$\int d^dx\sqrt{g}\left\{ \frac i 2 \left( \bar \Psi \gamma^a e^\mu_a\nabla_\mu \Psi - (\nabla_\mu \bar\Psi)e^\mu_a \gamma^a \Psi\right)+m\bar\Psi\Psi \right\}.$$

Here the spinor covariant derivatives are

$$\nabla_\mu \Psi =\left(\frac{\partial}{\partial x^\mu}+\frac 18 [\gamma_b,\gamma_c] {\omega^{bc}}_\mu\right) \Psi,$$

$$\nabla_\mu\bar  \Psi =\left(\frac{\partial}{\partial x^\mu}-\frac 18 [\gamma_b,\gamma_c] {\omega^{bc}}_\mu\right) \bar\Psi.$$

We therefore get

$$T^{(0)}_{bc}= \frac i2\left(\bar \Psi \gamma_c( \nabla_b\Psi) -(\nabla_b \bar \Psi)\gamma_c \Psi\right),$$

$${S^a}_{bc}= \frac i8 \bar\Psi\{\gamma^a,[\gamma_b,\gamma_c]\}\Psi.$$

There is no contribution from $\sqrt{g}$ if we use the equations of motion, i.e. we are on shell.

Now

$$\{\gamma_a,[\gamma_b,\gamma_c]\}=4 \gamma_a\gamma_b\gamma_c,$$

if $a, b, c$ are distinct and zero otherwise. As a consequence $S_{abc}$ is totally anti-symmetric. Now, using this result, and again the equations of motion, we find that

$$\nabla_a {S^a}_{bc}= T^{(0)}_{cb}-T^{(0)}_{bc}.$$

Thus the Belinfante–Rosenfeld tensor becomes

$$T_{bc} = T^{(0)}_{bc}+ \frac 12(T^{(0)}_{cb}-T^{(0)}_{bc})
= \frac 12 (T^{(0)}_{bc}+T^{(0)}_{cb}).$$

The Belinfante–Rosenfeld tensor for the Dirac field is therefore seen to be the symmetrized canonical energy–momentum tensor.

== Weinberg's definition ==
Steven Weinberg defined the Belinfante tensor as

$$T_B^{\mu\nu}=T^{\mu\nu}-\frac{i}{2}\partial_\kappa \left[\frac{\partial\mathcal{L}}{\partial(\partial_\kappa\Psi^\ell)}(\mathcal{J}^{\mu\nu})^\ell_{\,\, m}\Psi^m-\frac{\partial\mathcal{L}}{\partial(\partial_\mu\Psi^\ell)}(\mathcal{J}^{\kappa\nu})^\ell_{\,\, m}\Psi^m-\frac{\partial\mathcal{L}}{\partial(\partial_\nu\Psi^\ell)}(\mathcal{J}^{\kappa\mu})^\ell_{\,\, m}\Psi^m\right]$$

where $\mathcal{L}$ is the Lagrangian density, the set {Ψ} are the fields appearing in the Lagrangian, the non-Belinfante energy momentum tensor is defined by

$$T^{\mu\nu}=\eta^{\mu\nu}\mathcal{L}-\frac{\partial\mathcal{L}}{\partial(\partial_\mu\Psi^\ell)}\partial^\nu\Psi^\ell$$

and $\mathcal{J^{\mu\nu}}$ are a set of matrices satisfying the algebra of the homogeneous Lorentz group

$$[\mathcal{J}^{\mu\nu},\mathcal{J}^{\rho\sigma}]=i\mathcal{J}^{\nu\rho}\eta^{\mu\sigma}-i\mathcal{J}^{\nu\sigma}\eta^{\mu\rho}-i\mathcal{J}^{\mu\rho}\eta^{\nu\sigma}+i\mathcal{J}^{\mu\sigma}\eta^{\nu\rho}$$.
