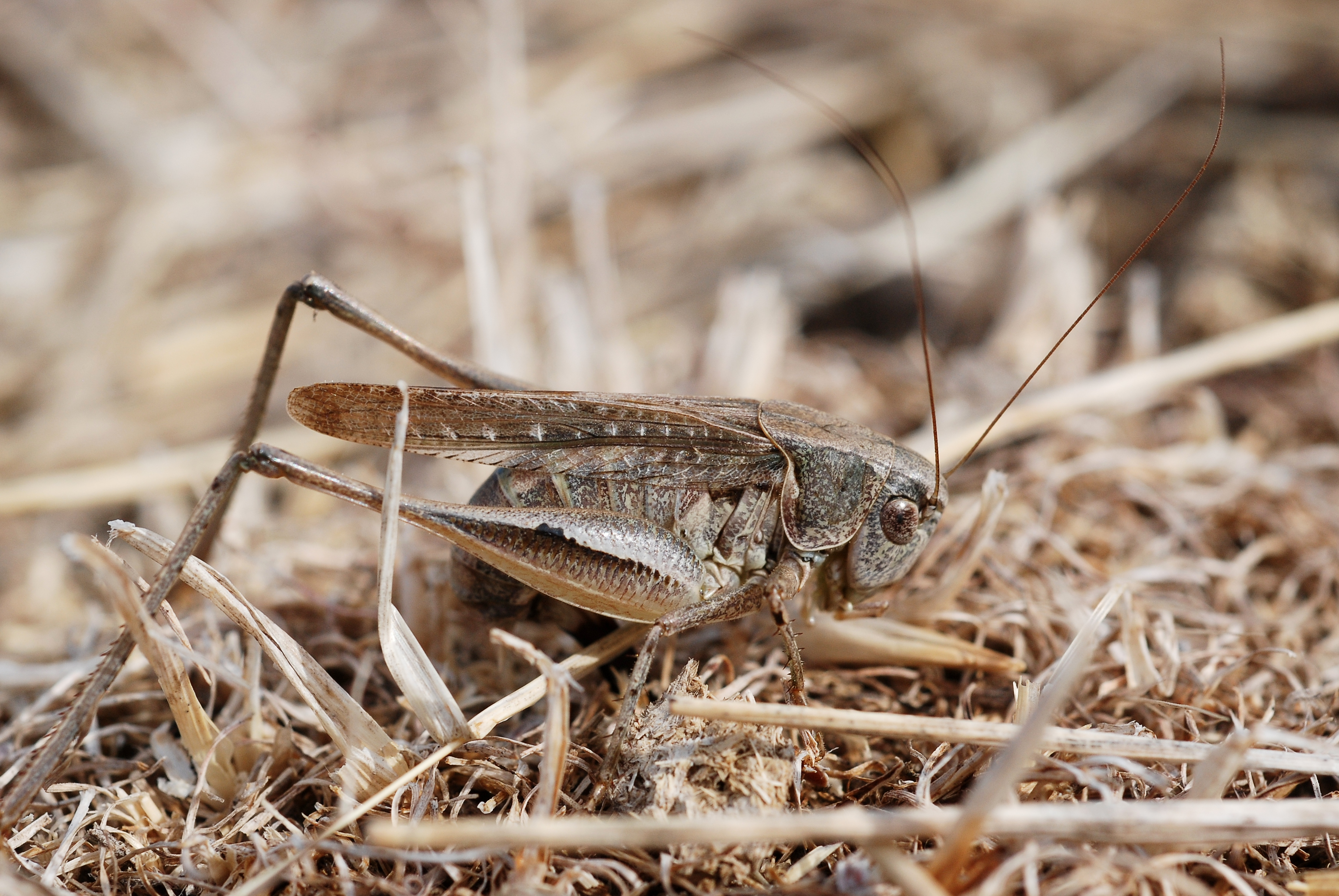
- Platycleis grisea (type sp.)

Scientific classification
- Domain: Eukaryota
- Kingdom: Animalia
- Phylum: Arthropoda
- Class: Insecta
- Order: Orthoptera
- Suborder: Ensifera
- Family: Tettigoniidae
- Subfamily: Tettigoniinae
- Tribe: Platycleidini
- Genus: Platycleis; Fieber, 1853

Synonyms
- Chelidoptera Wesmaël, 1838

= Platycleis =

Genus of cricket-like animals

Platycleis is a genus of bush crickets described by Fieber in 1853, belonging to the subfamily Tettigoniinae. The species of this genus are present in Europe, North Africa and temperate Asia.

== Biology ==
Studies conducted in 2010 at the University of Derby by Karim Vahed, Darren Parker and James Gilbert found that the tuberous bushcricket (Platycleis affinis) has the largest testicles in proportion to body mass of any animal recorded. They account for 14% of the insect's body mass and are thought to enable a fast re-mating rate. Platycleis albopunctata is the grey bush cricket and occurs in the British Isles.

== Taxonomy ==
=== Genus group Platycleis ===
A number of Palaearctic genera are very similar, often including species that were originally placed here by Carl Brunner von Wattenwyl and others. They are now in a genus group and include:

1. Alticolana Zeuner, 1941
2. Eumetrioptera Miram, 1935
3. Incertana Zeuner, 1941
4. Montana Zeuner, 1941
5. Parnassiana Zeuner, 1941
6. Platycleis Fieber, 1853
7. Semenoviana Zeuner, 1941
8. Sepiana Zeuner, 1941
9. Sporadiana Zeuner, 1941
10. Squamiana Zeuner, 1941
11. Tessellana Zeuner, 1941
12. Yalvaciana Çiplak, Heller & Demirsoy, 2002

=== Species ===
The Orthoptera Species File lists the following accepted species:

1. Platycleis affinis Fieber, 1853
2. Platycleis albopunctata (Goeze, 1778)
3. Platycleis alexandra (Uvarov, 1926)
4. Platycleis buzzettii Massa & Fontana, 2011
5. Platycleis concii Galvagni, 1959
6. Platycleis curvicauda Podgornaya, 1988
7. Platycleis escalerai Bolívar, 1899
8. Platycleis falx (Fabricius, 1775)
9. Platycleis fatima Uvarov, 1912
10. Platycleis grisea (Fabricius, 1781) - type species (as Locusta grisea Fabricius)
11. Platycleis iberica Zeuner, 1941
12. Platycleis iljinskii Uvarov, 1917
13. Platycleis intermedia (Serville, 1838)
14. Platycleis irinae Sergeev & Pokivajlov, 1992
15. Platycleis kabulica Bey-Bienko, 1967
16. Platycleis kashmira (Uvarov, 1930)
17. Platycleis kibris Ünal, 2012
18. Platycleis latitabunda Stolyarov, 1968
19. Platycleis longicauda Tarbinsky, 1930
20. Platycleis meridiana Stolyarov, 1969
21. Platycleis pamirica (Zeuner, 1930)
22. Platycleis pathana Zeuner, 1941
23. †Platycleis pongraczi Zeuner, 1929
24. Platycleis ragusai Ramme, 1927
25. Platycleis rahmoiensis Jaiswara & Shah, 2022
26. Platycleis romana Ramme, 1927
27. Platycleis sabinegaali Garai, 2011
28. Platycleis sabulosa Azam, 1901
29. Platycleis sogdiana Mistshenko, 1954
30. †Platycleis speciosa (Heer, 1865)
31. Platycleis trivittata Bey-Bienko, 1951
32. Platycleis turanica Zeuner, 1930
33. Platycleis waltheri Harz, 1966

== Gallery ==
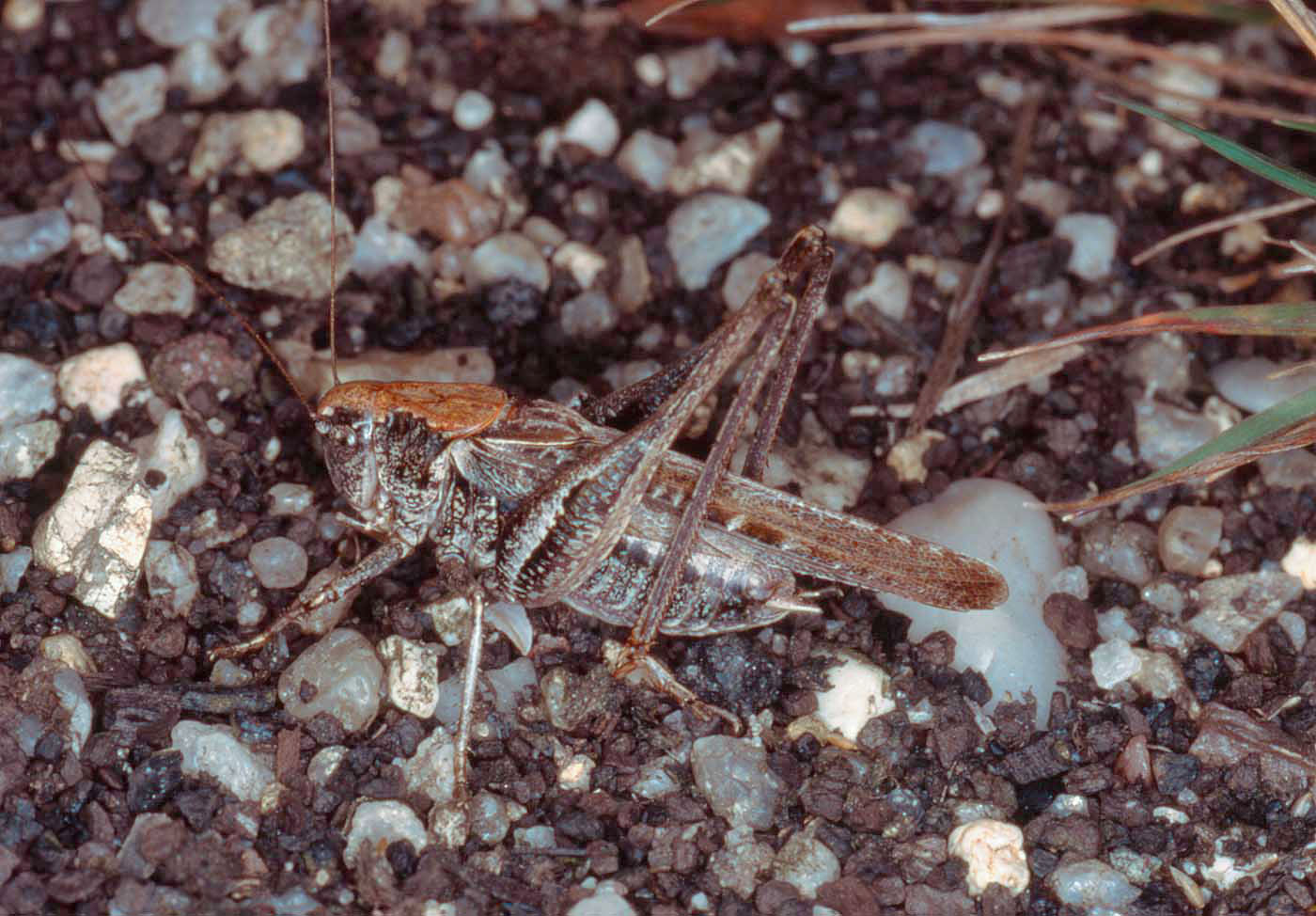
Platycleis albopunctata male

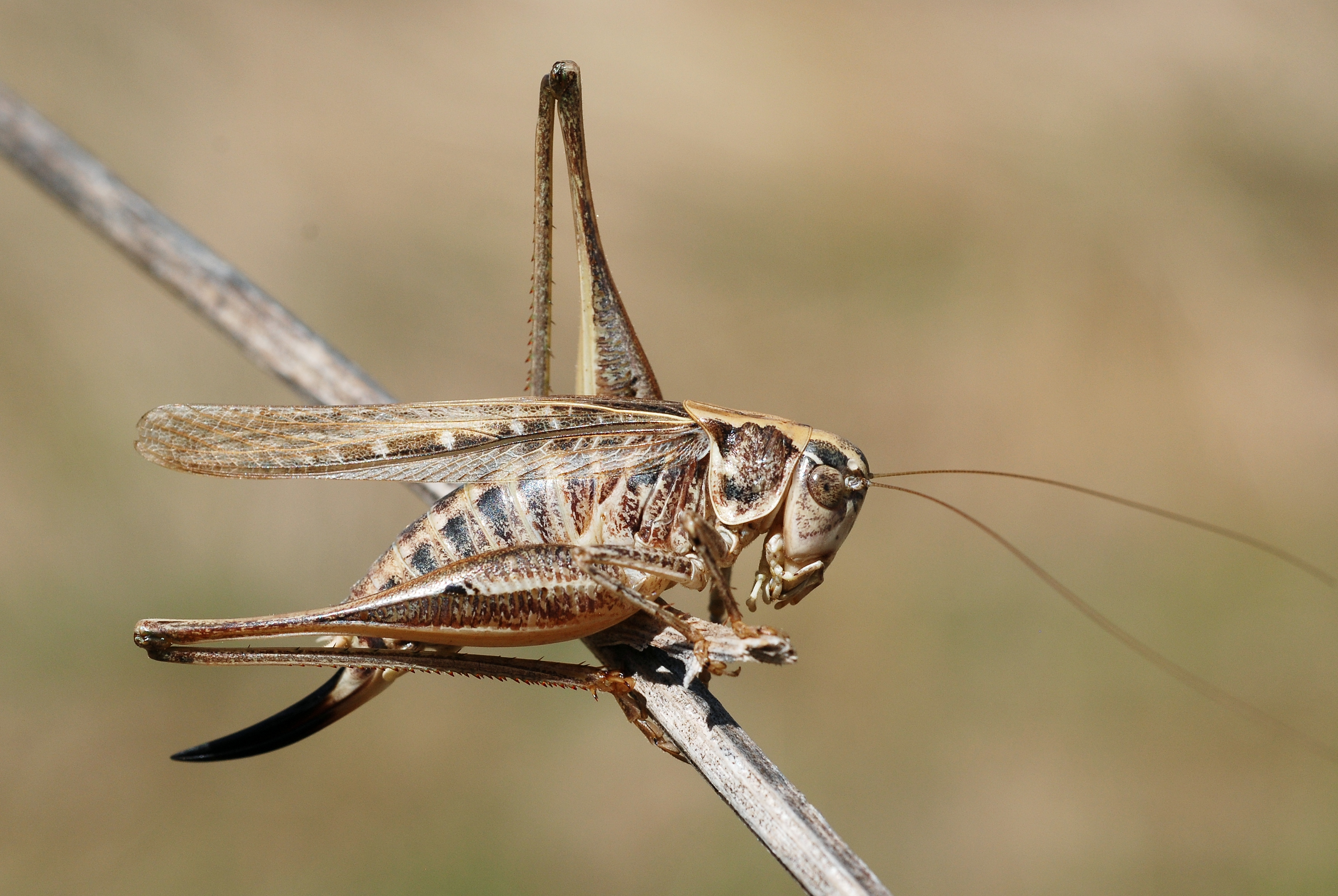
Platycleis affinis

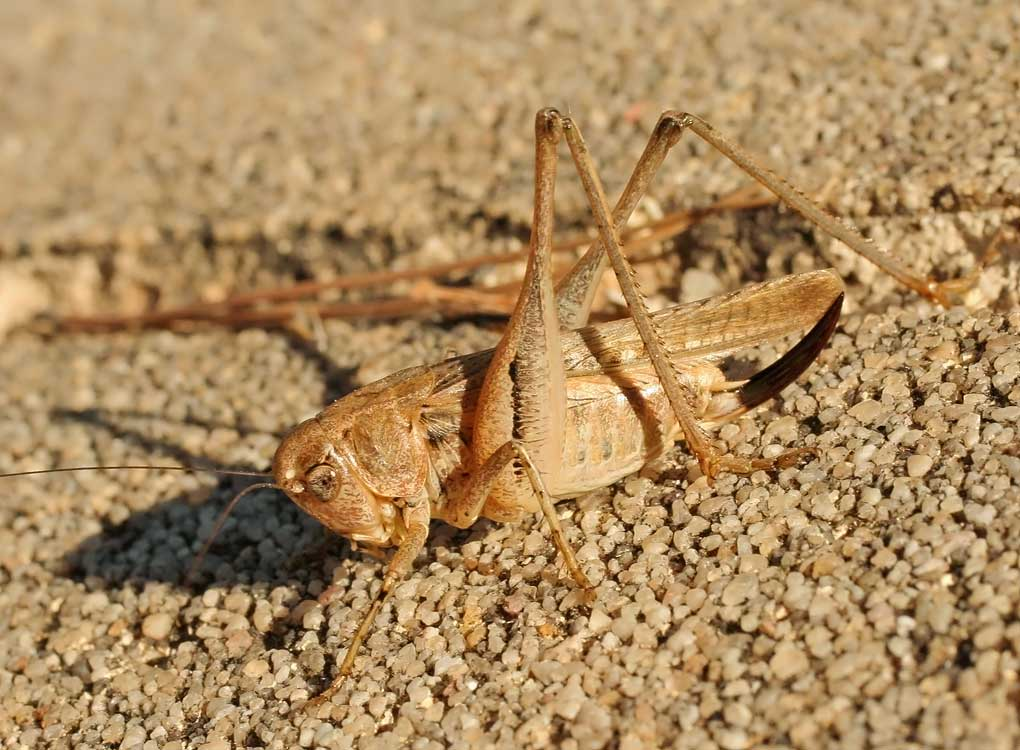
Platycleis sabulosa

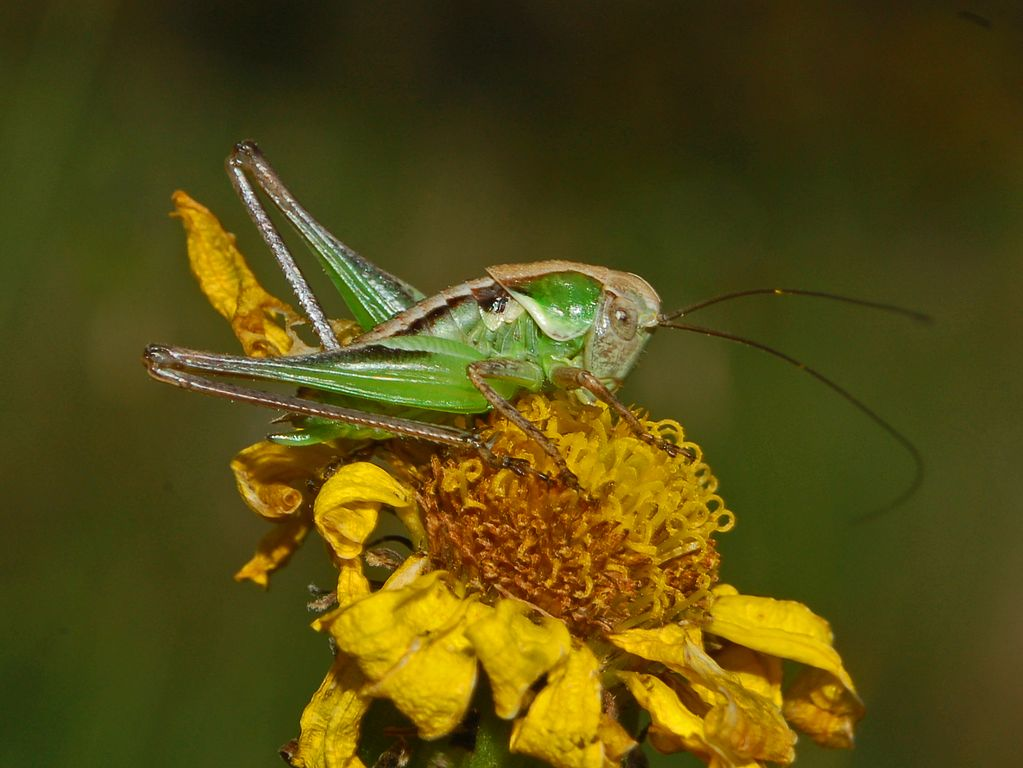
P. sp. nymph

== See also ==
- List of Orthopteroid genera containing species recorded in Europe
