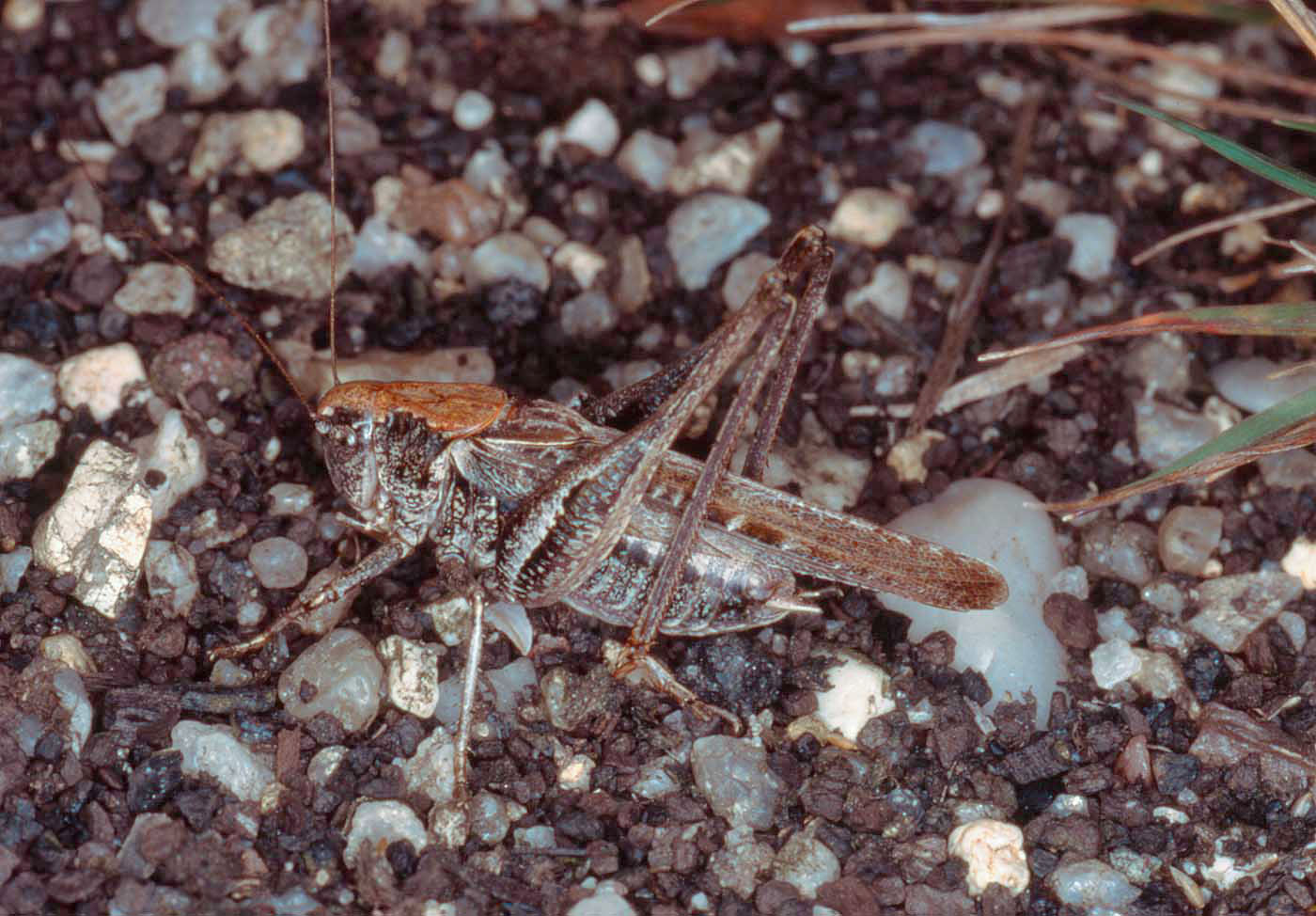

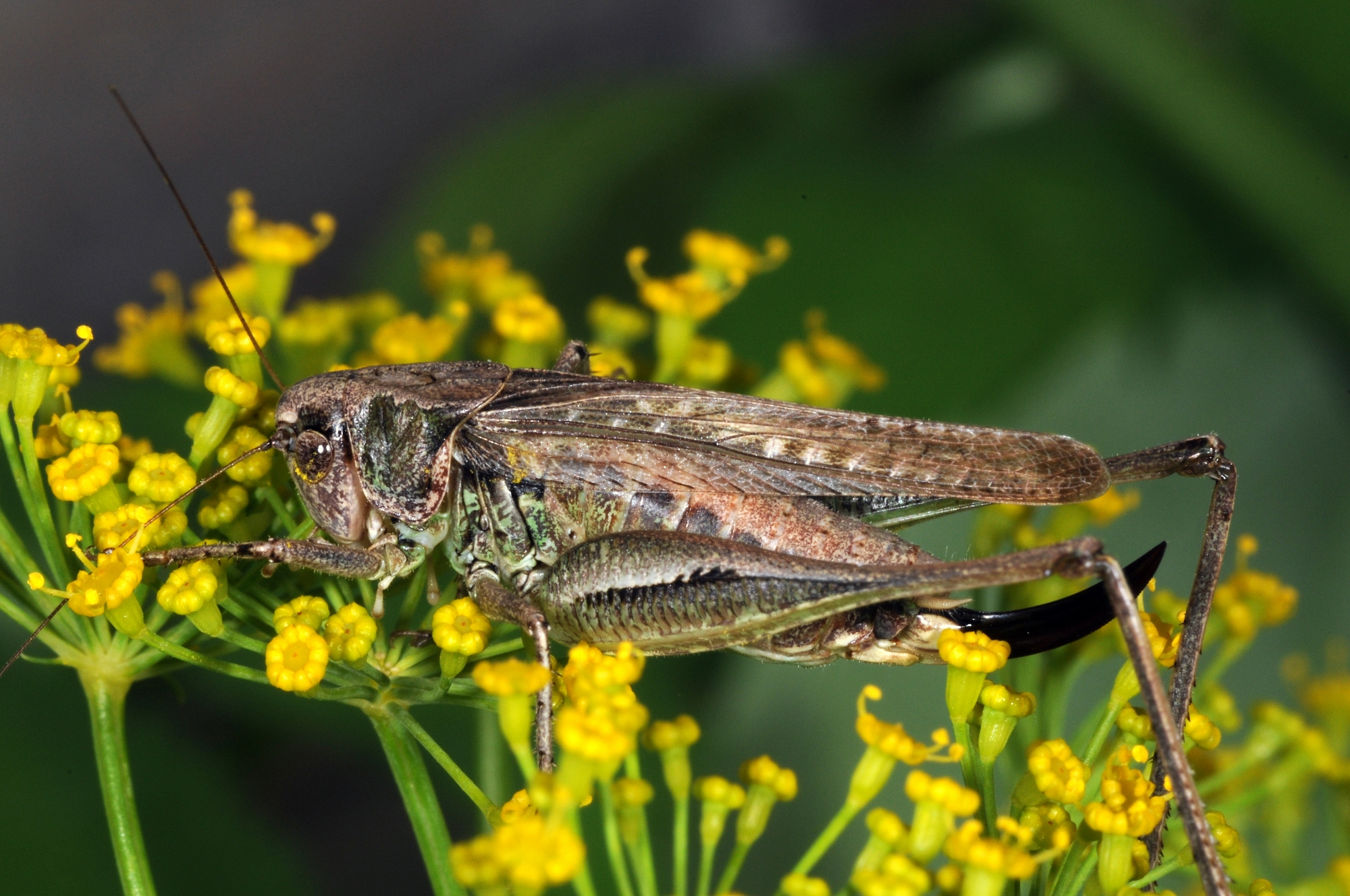
- Platycleis albopunctata – female

Scientific classification
- Domain: Eukaryota
- Kingdom: Animalia
- Phylum: Arthropoda
- Class: Insecta
- Order: Orthoptera
- Suborder: Ensifera
- Family: Tettigoniidae
- Subfamily: Tettigoniinae
- Tribe: Platycleidini
- Genus: Platycleis
- Species: P. albopunctata

Binomial name
- Platycleis albopunctata Goeze, 1778

Synonyms
- Platycleis denticulata Panzer, 1796; Platycleis occidentalis Zeuner, 1941.

= Platycleis albopunctata =

Species of cricket-like animal

Close-Up of a Platycleis albopunctata

Platycleis albopunctata is a species of European bush cricket in the tribe Platycleidini.

This species occurs throughout Europe and in North Africa; several subspecies have been described (below). The nominate subspecies occurs in the British Isles where it is often called the grey bush cricket.

== Description and Biology ==
Song of P. albopunctata (BMNH)

In mainland Europe, grey bush crickets can be confused with the very similar to P. grisea. Their habitat includes areas with low and dry vegetation, such as sunny slopes and sandy open fields. The primary colour of the body is greyish to brownish, often with reddish brown elements on the upper side of the head and neck. The wings are long.

P. albopunctata is omnivorous, eating both plants and smaller insects. The males can be fairly aggressive and attract mates with a song consisting of a rather weak "zirr".

== Subspecies ==
The Orthoptera Species File lists:

- P. albopunctata albopunctata (Goeze, 1778)
- P. albopunctata collina Navás, 1924 - Iberian peninsula
- P. albopunctata cretica Willemse & Kruseman, 1976
- P. albopunctata hispanica Zeuner, 1941 - France, Iberian peninsula
- P. albopunctata maura Zeuner, 1941 - N Africa
- P. albopunctata monticola (Chopard, 1924) - Corsica
- P. albopunctata sculpta Zeuner, 1941 - Iberian peninsula
- P. albopunctata transiens Zeuner, 1941
- P. albopunctata yerseyana Zeuner, 1940 - France

== Gallery ==
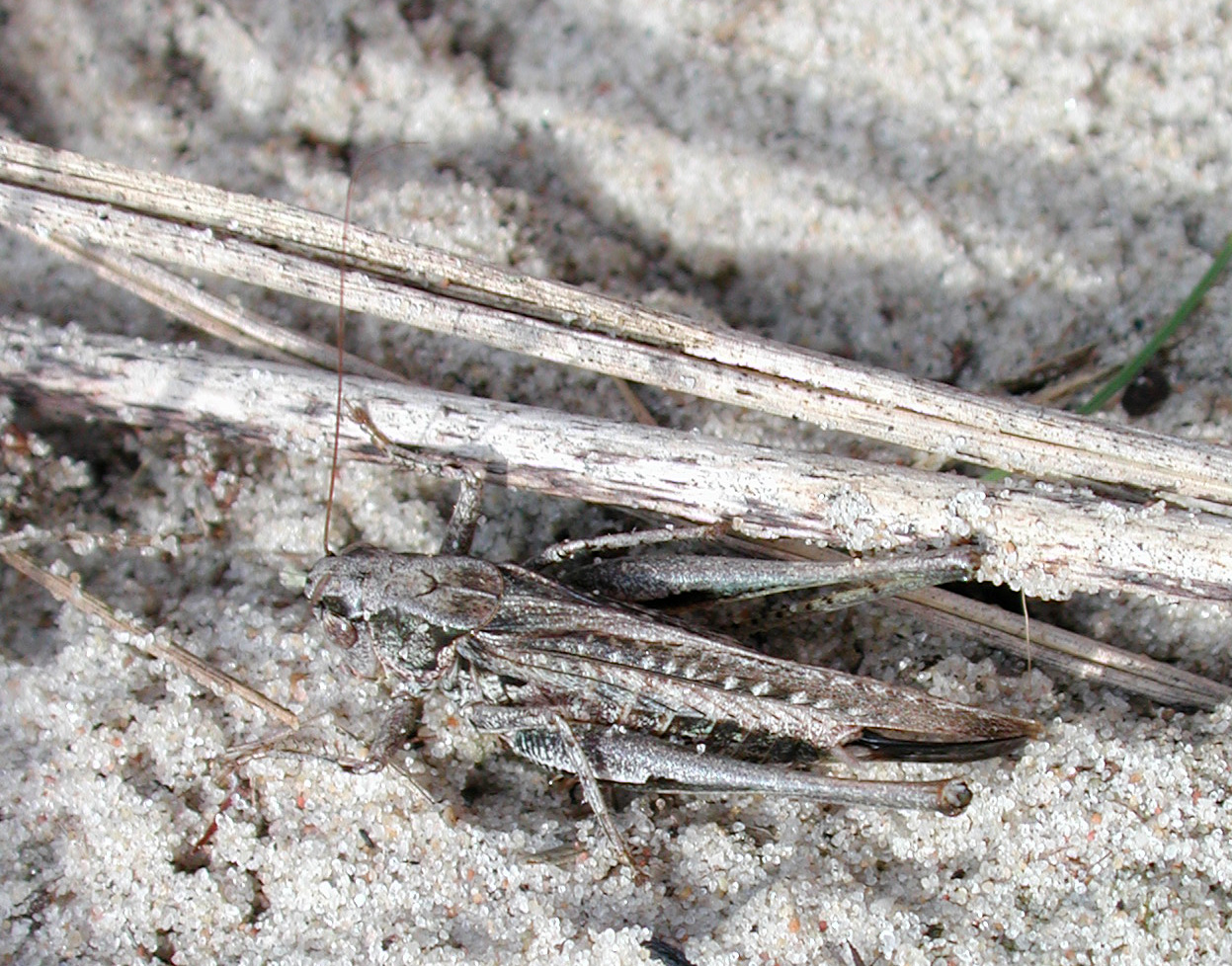
female

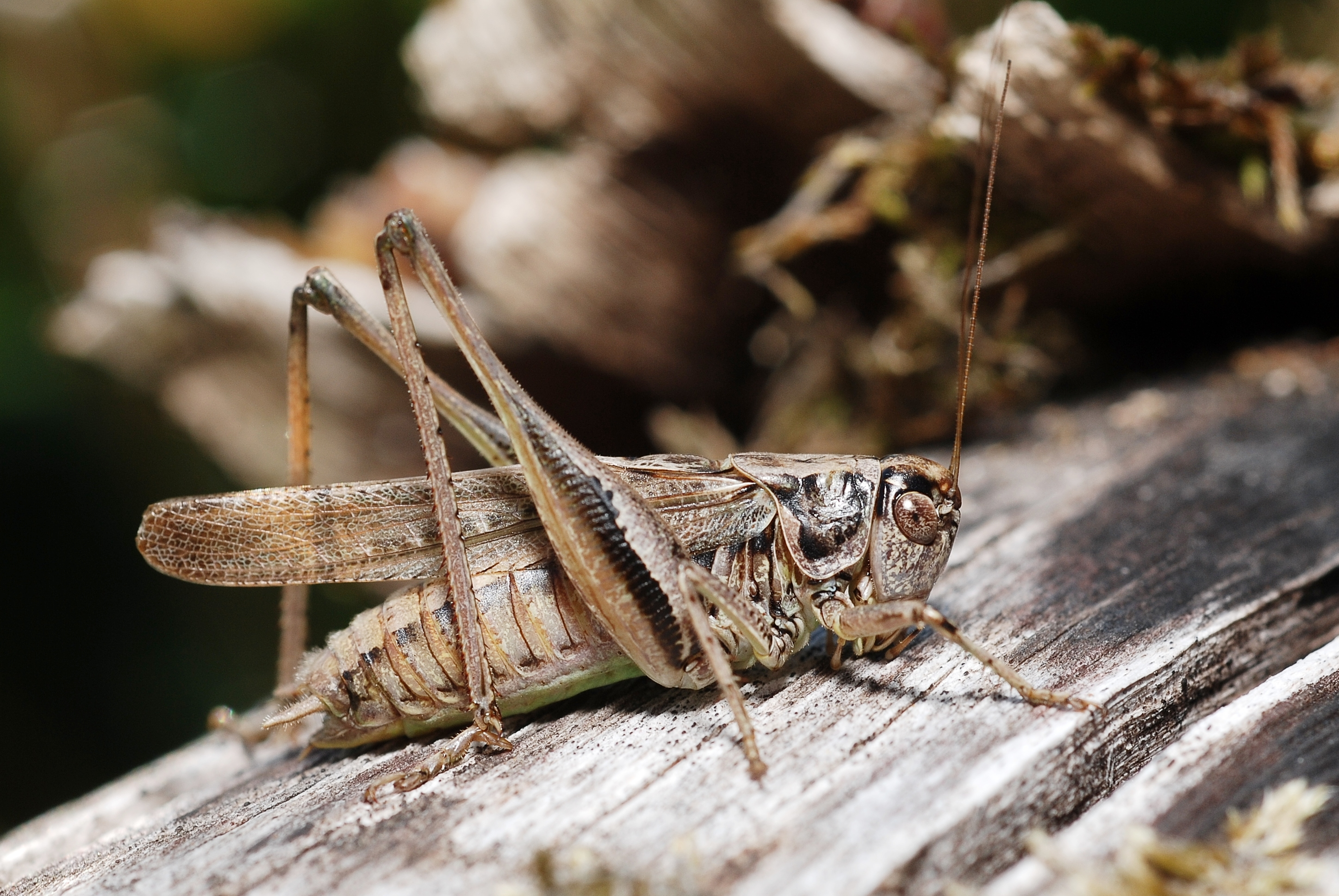
male
