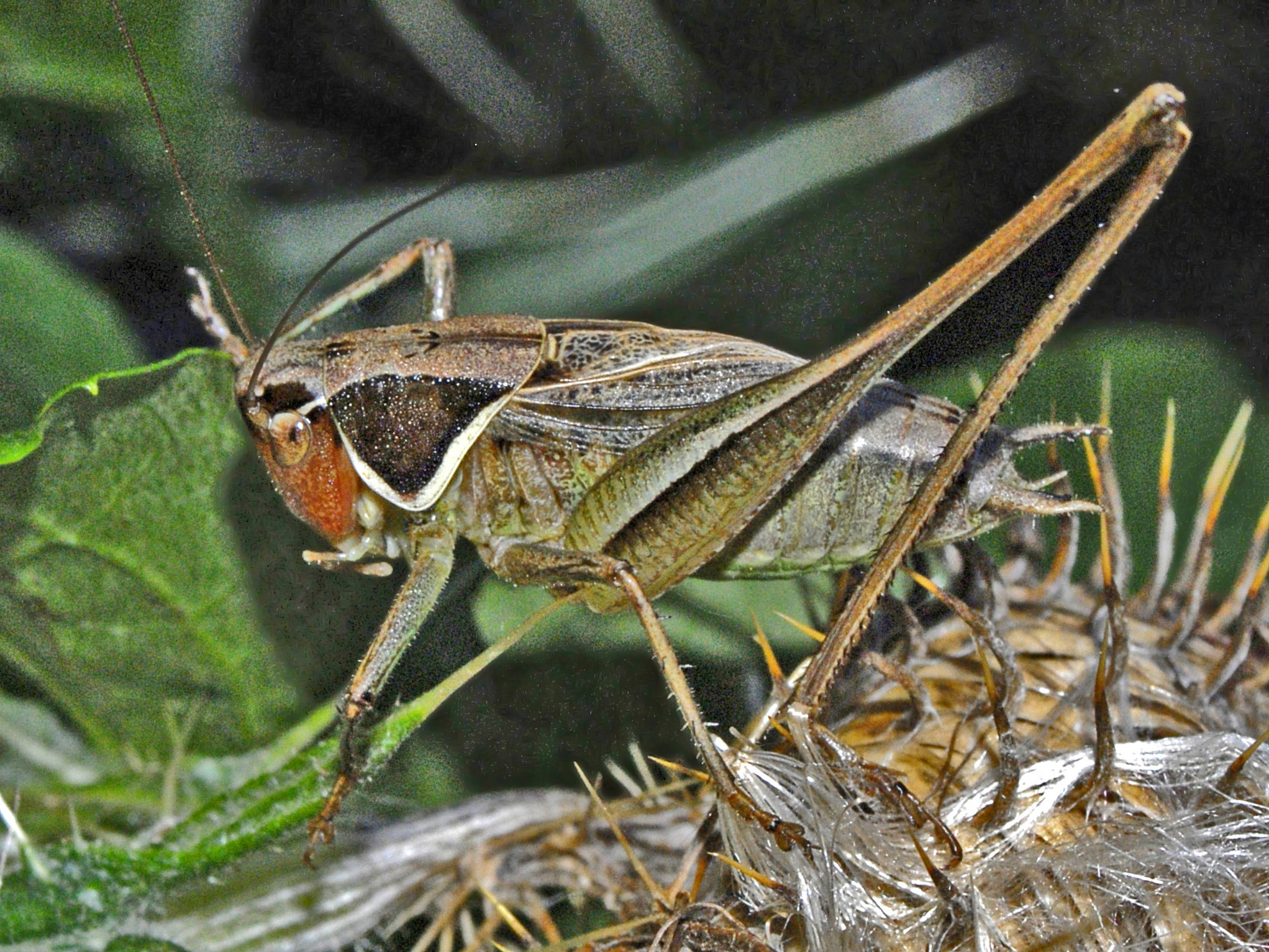
- Sepiana sepium, male
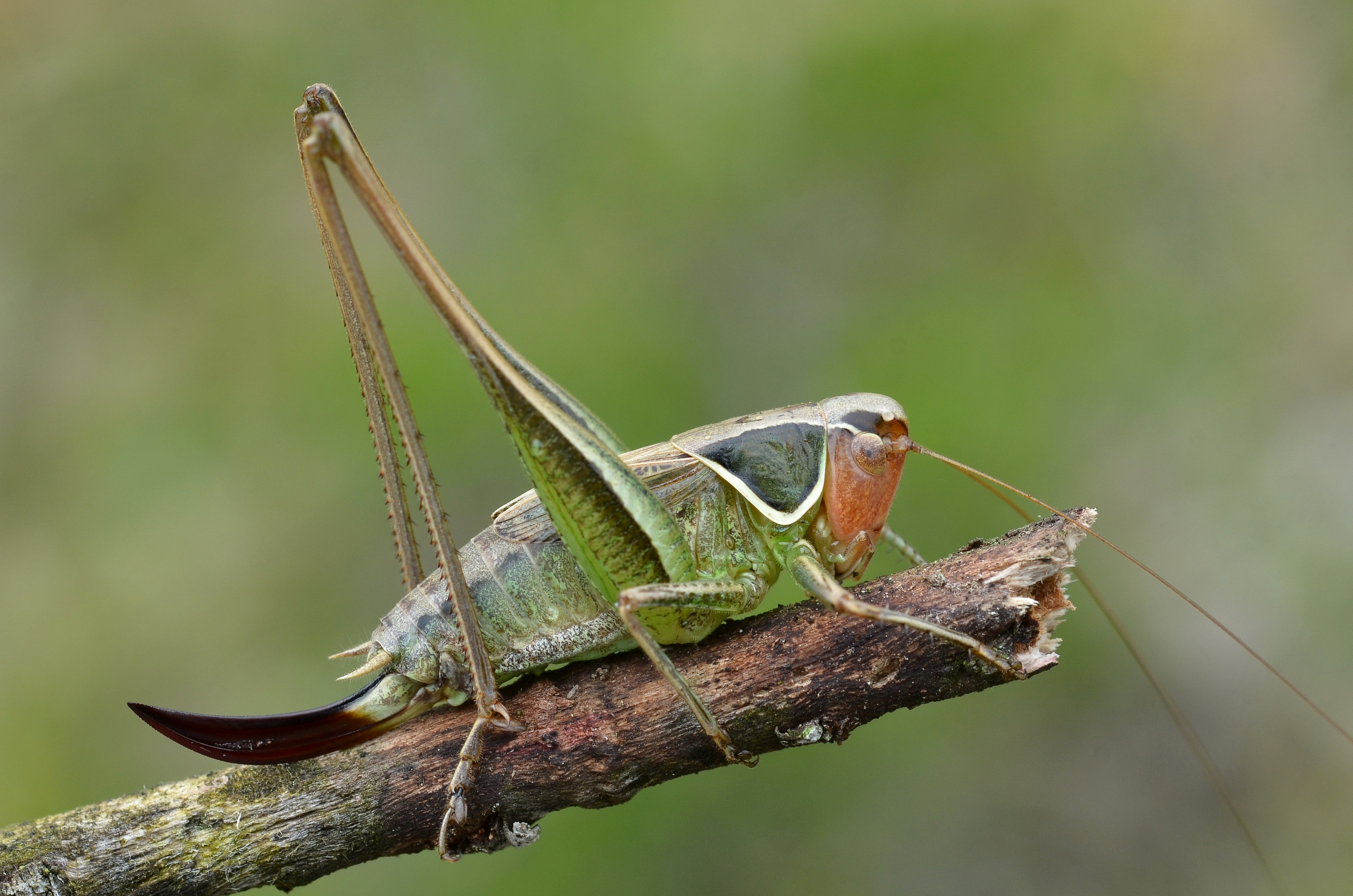
- Sepiana sepium, female

Scientific classification
- Domain: Eukaryota
- Kingdom: Animalia
- Phylum: Arthropoda
- Class: Insecta
- Order: Orthoptera
- Suborder: Ensifera
- Family: Tettigoniidae
- Subfamily: Tettigoniinae
- Tribe: Platycleidini
- Genus: Sepiana; Zeuner, 1941
- Species: S. sepium

Binomial name
- Sepiana sepium (Yersin, 1854)

Synonyms
- Species synonymy: Chelidoptera sepium (Yersin, 1854); Decticus sepium Yersin, 1854; Metrioptera sepium (Yersin, 1854); Platycleis sepium (Yersin, 1854)

= Sepiana =

Species of cricket-like animal

Video of Sepiana sepium

Sepiana sepium, common name sepia bush-cricket, is a species of bush crickets belonging to the tribe Platycleidini and genus group Platycleis. It is the only species within the monotypic genus Sepiana.

== Distribution ==
This widespread species is present from southwestern to southeastern Europe and in the Near East. It can be found from Portugal and Spain, southern France, Italy and the Balkan Peninsula along the Black Sea to Turkey and to south-west Russia.

== Habitat ==
These bush crickets usually live in not too xerothermic areas on the edge of the forests and in bushland, but also on grassy meadows.

== Description ==
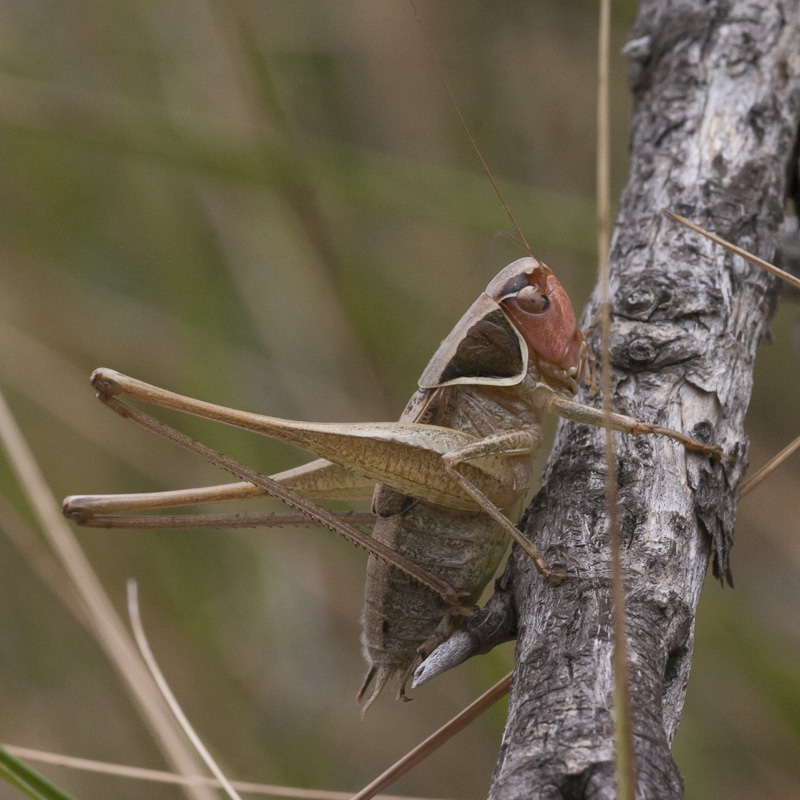
S. sepium, male

Sepiana sepium can reach a length of 20–27 millimetres (0.79–1.06 in). The ovopositor reaches 10–15 millimetres (0.39–0.59 in). These bush crickets have very long enlarged hind legs, with small spines on the lower legs. The ground colour of the body ranges from gray-brown to reddish. The sides of the pronotum are almost triangular-shaped, usually black or dark brown, and they are clearly delineated by a bright longitudinal line. The head is usually reddish coloured. Above the eyes there is a dark patch, which is crossed by a whitish line. The legs are dark brown or dark gray. On the hind legs there is a dark brown stripe. The cerci of the males are flattened. In the females the 6th and 7th abdominal segments have a pair of cusps. This species is quite similar to Metrioptera roeselii.

The bush crickets of this species, similarly to the species within the genus Platycleis, have the largest testicles in proportion to body mass of any animal recorded.

== Biology ==
Adults appear from July to September. Their vocals consist of highly scratching sounds, which are performed at a very short distance from one another.
