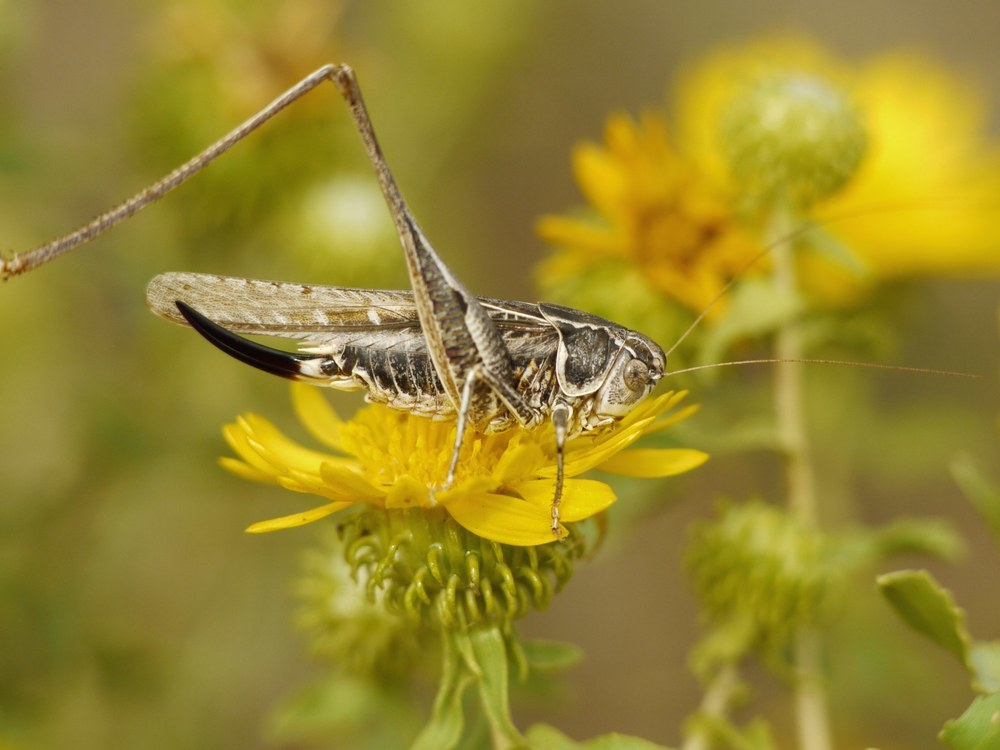
- Montana stricta female
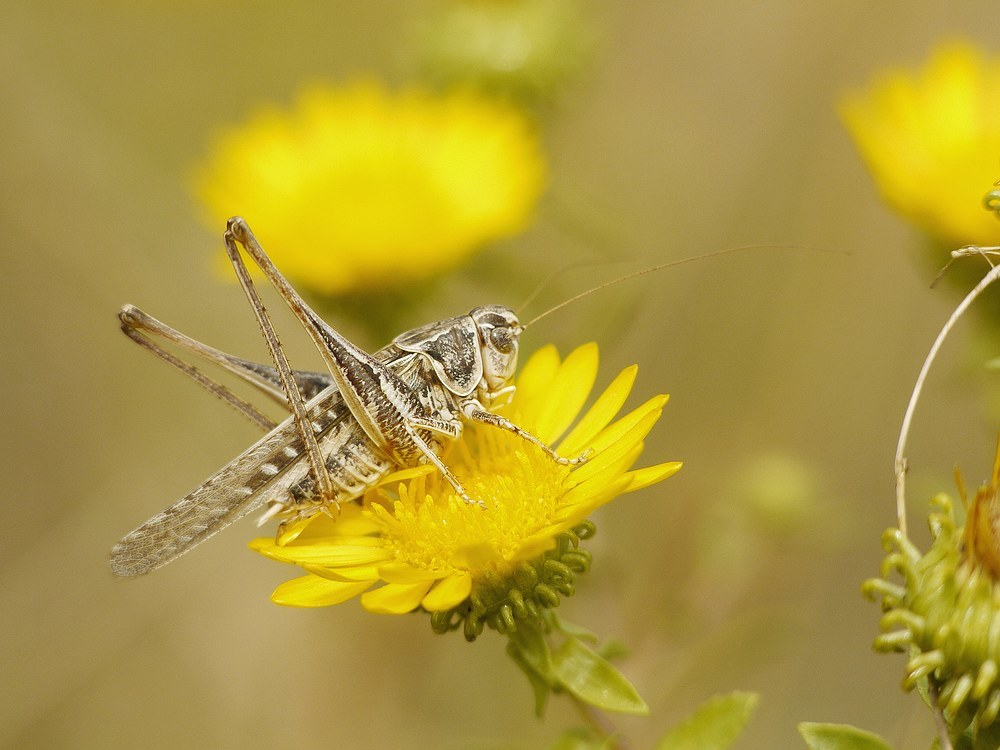
- M. stricta male: the Italian Bush-cricket

Scientific classification
- Domain: Eukaryota
- Kingdom: Animalia
- Phylum: Arthropoda
- Class: Insecta
- Order: Orthoptera
- Suborder: Ensifera
- Family: Tettigoniidae
- Subfamily: Tettigoniinae
- Tribe: Platycleidini
- Genus: Montana; Zeuner, 1941

= Montana (bush cricket) =

Genus of cricket-like animals

Montana is a genus of bush crickets in the tribe Platycleidini, erected by F.E. Zeuner in 1941. The type species, M. montana has been called the "Steppe Bush-Cricket". Some authorities previously placed this as a subgenus of Platycleis, but it is now considered a separate genus, as part of the genus group Platycleis. Species can be found in the northern Palaearctic realm from mainland western Europe (not the British Isles) through to Siberia.

== Species ==
The Orthoptera Species File lists the following accepted species:

1. Montana armeniaca (Ramme, 1930)
2. Montana barretii (Burr, 1912)
3. Montana carpetana (Bolívar, 1887)
4. Montana daghestanica (Uvarov, 1917)
5. Montana decticiformis (Stshelkanovtzev, 1914)
6. Montana elegans (Uvarov, 1934)
7. Montana eversmanni (Kittary, 1849)
8. Montana gaskoi Garai, 2011
9. Montana heinrichi (Ramme, 1929)
10. Montana helleri (Çiplak & Taylan, 2006)
11. Montana kure (Ünal, 2006)
12. Montana macedonica (Berland & Chopard, 1922)
13. Montana medvedevi (Miram, 1927)
14. Montana montana (Kollar, 1833) = type species (as Locusta montana Kollar)
15. Montana richteri (Bey-Bienko, 1958)
16. Montana schereri (Werner, 1901)
17. Montana striata (Thunberg, 1815)
18. Montana stricta (Zeller, 1849)
19. Montana taurica (Bolívar, 1899)
20. Montana tianshanica (Uvarov, 1933)
21. Montana tomini (Pylnov, 1916)
22. Montana uvarovi Karabag, 1950
23. Montana zanjanica Garai, 2011
