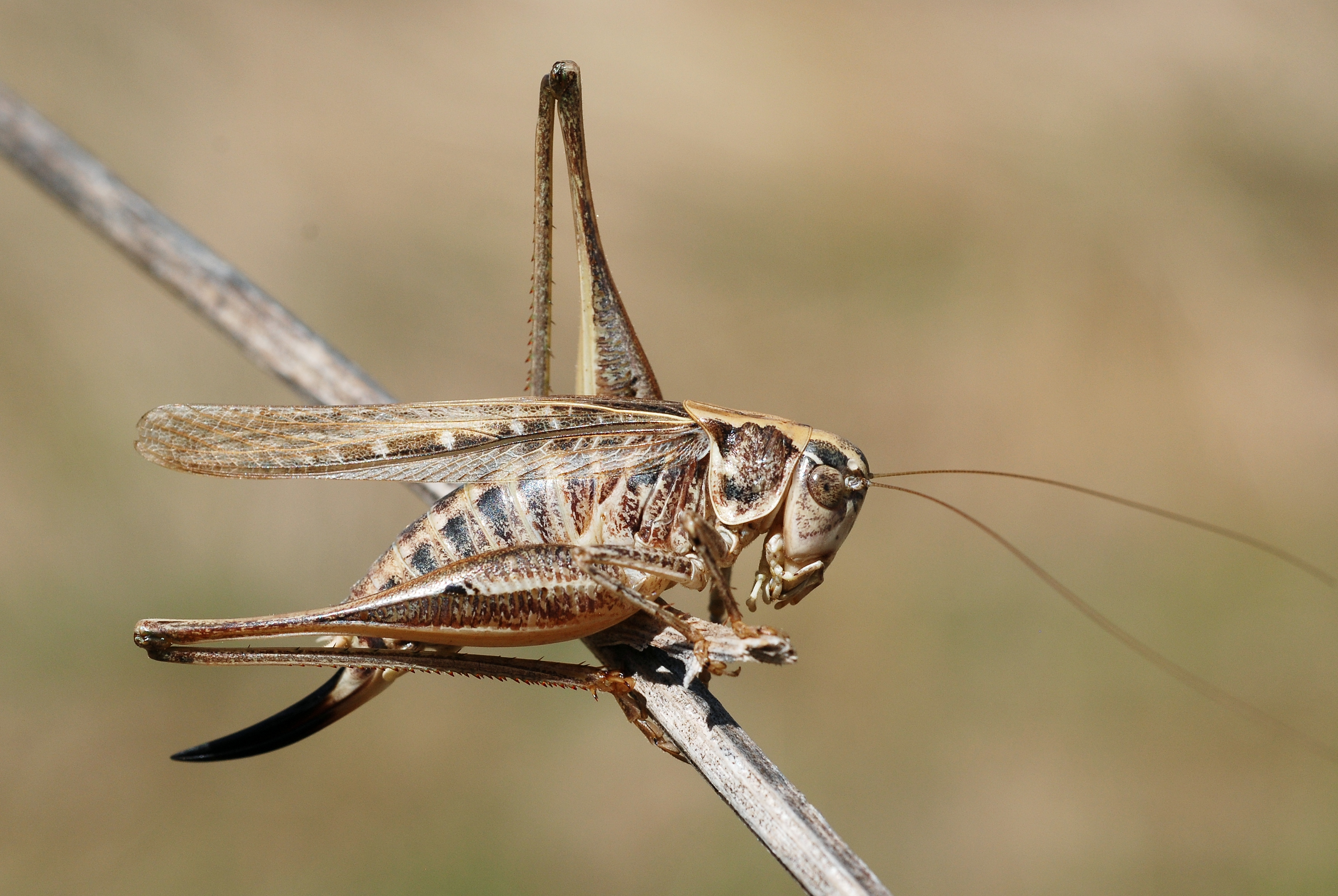

Scientific classification
- Kingdom: Animalia
- Phylum: Arthropoda
- Clade: Pancrustacea
- Class: Insecta
- Order: Orthoptera
- Suborder: Ensifera
- Family: Tettigoniidae
- Genus: Platycleis
- Species: P. affinis

Binomial name
- Platycleis affinis Fieber (1853)

= Platycleis affinis =

Species of cricket-like animal

Platycleis affinis is an insect species belonging to the subfamily Tettigoniinae of family Tettigoniidae. It is found in Southern Europe. Research led by Karim Vahed found that the testes of this bush cricket account for 14% of its total body weight.

Close-Up of a Platycleis affinis
