= Frederik Belinfante =

Dutch physicist (1913–1991)

Frederik Jozef Belinfante
- Born: 6 January 1913; The Hague
- Died: 5 June 1991 (aged 78); Gresham, Oregon
- Education: Leiden University
- Known for: Belinfante–Rosenfeld stress–energy tensor
- Scientific career
- Fields: Physics
- Workplaces: University of British Columbia; Purdue University
- Doctoral students: Deng Jiaxian

Frederik Jozef Belinfante (6 January 1913 – 5 June 1991) was a Dutch physicist and a professor at Purdue University. He was a proponent of the hidden variable interpretation of quantum mechanics. Belinfante was born in the Hague and was a student of H. A. Kramers at Leiden University. His Ph.D. thesis, published in 1939, is called 'Theory of Heavy Quanta'. Belinfante emigrated to Vancouver in 1946 and became an associate professor at the University of British Columbia. Two years later, in 1948, he moved to the United States and became a professor at Purdue. There, he studied quantum theory and cosmology.

While writing his Ph.D. thesis, Belinfante co-authored a paper with Wolfgang Pauli called 'On the statistical behaviour of known and unknown elementary particles' Along with Léon Rosenfeld, Belinfante derived the Belinfante–Rosenfeld stress–energy tensor.

Belinfante's works include Measurement and Time Reversal in Objective Quantum Theory (1975) and Survey of Hidden Variable Theories (1973), both part of the Monographs in Natural Philosophy series.

== Personal life ==
Belinfante was an avid philatelist with a large collection of Netherlands stamps. He was a contributor of articles on Netherlands philately to the journal of the American Society for Netherlands Philately.
