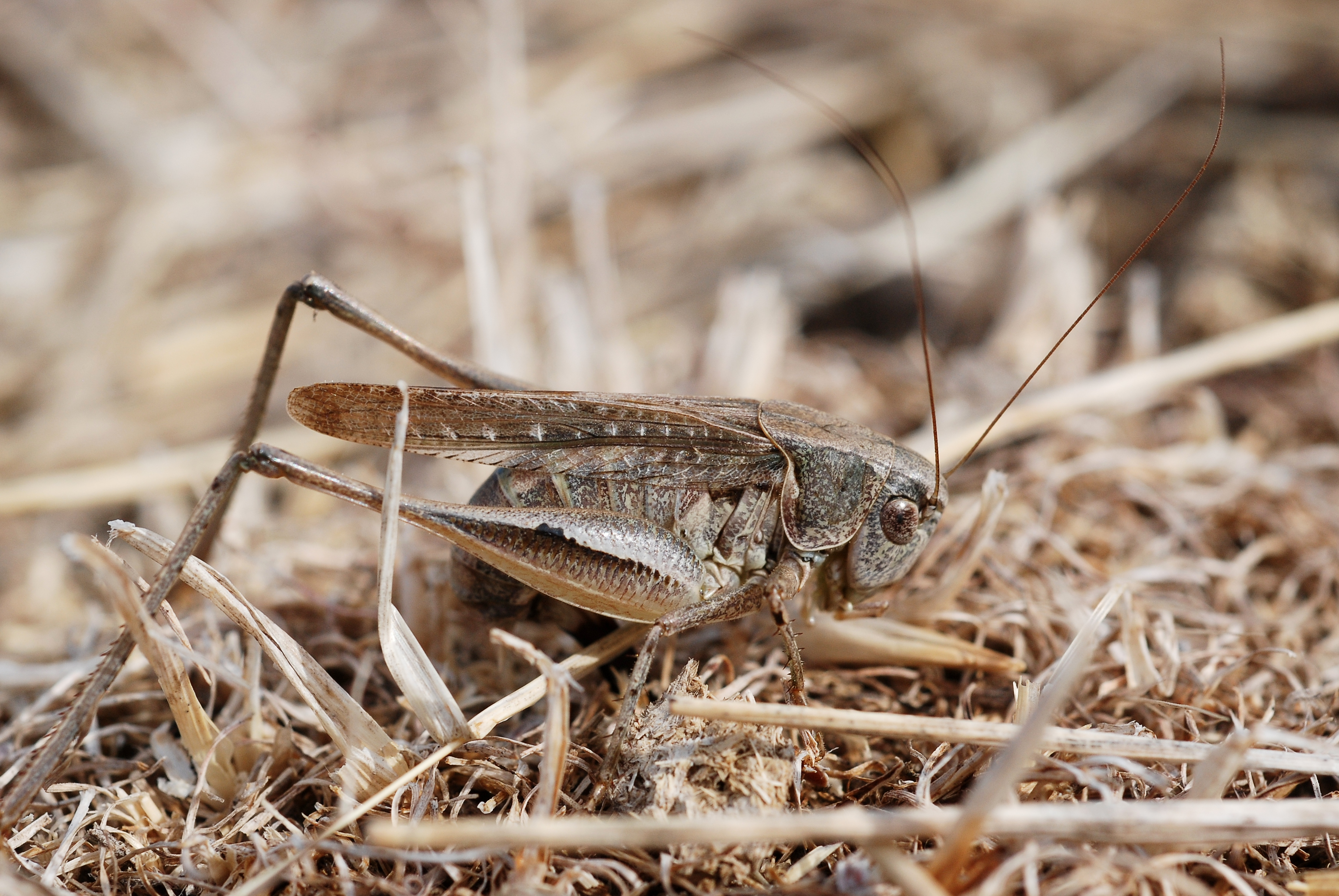

Scientific classification
- Kingdom: Animalia
- Phylum: Arthropoda
- Class: Insecta
- Order: Orthoptera
- Suborder: Ensifera
- Family: Tettigoniidae
- Subfamily: Tettigoniinae
- Tribe: Platycleidini
- Genus: Platycleis
- Species: P. grisea

Binomial name
- Platycleis grisea (Fabricius, 1781)

Synonyms
- Locusta grisea Fabricius, 1781; Platycleis albopunctata grisea

= Platycleis grisea =

Species of cricket-like animal

Song of P. grisea

Close-Up of a Platycleis grisea

Platycleis grisea is a European species of bush crickets described by Fabricius in 1781. It is the type species of the genus Platycleis and therefore the tribe Platycleidini. This species is recorded from mainland Europe (not the British Isles or Scandinavia) and northern Africa.

== Description and Biology ==
P. grisea has body length of 15-24 mm and are usually quite uniformly coloured grey to light brown and marbled in a darker brown, with a lighter underside. The fore-wings are usually whitish and spotted. The side lobes of the pronotum are often patterned in a coarser brown and lined with a narrow, light colour and a central keel is apparent in the front half. The pronotum is rarely green or ivory-coloured on the upper side, but is often reddish. Like all representatives of the genus Platycleis, the species is almost always long-winged, the wings clearly protrude not only over the tip of the abdomen but also the rear knees when at rest. The species is able to fly well and populations are able to disperse easily. In females, the dark-coloured ovipositor is relatively short and evenly curved upwards. The cerci in the male are serrated on the inside beyond the distal half.

This species is very similar to P. albopunctata, which is practically identical in body shape and colour, and hybrids may also occur in the southern Alps. They can only be definitively distinguished by the genitalia. The song is also very similar, consisting of soft, four- to six-syllable chirping that continue for several minutes, which can only be heard from within a few metres.

As with the similar species, P. grisea prefers living in warm, dry grasslands and other habitats, often with patchy vegetation. It also occurs in semi-urban habitats such as railway and road embankments, and quarries. Sexually mature adults can be found from June to October.
