= Jo McDonald =

Australian archaeologist

Dr Josephine McDonald is an Australian archaeologist and Director of the Centre for Rock Art Research + Management at the University of Western Australia. McDonald is primarily known for her influence in the field of rock art research and her collaborative research with Australian Aboriginal communities.

== Education ==
McDonald received her undergraduate training at the University of Sydney and her PhD from the Australian National University. Her PhD research, titled Dreamtime Superhighway: An analysis of Sydney Basin rock art and prehistoric information exchange, supervised by Andree Rosenfeld, Isobel McBryde, and Anthony Forge was completed in 1994 and a revised and expanded version was published by Terra Australis in 2008. This work was influential in demonstrating the cultural and social influence of rock art through research in the Sydney Basin. Her doctorate research also helped to create an understanding of radiocarbon direct-dating on pigment rock art, an innovation in Australian archaeology.

== Career ==
McDonald's early career was as a cultural heritage consultant primarily based in New South Wales. McDonald was Director of Brayshaw McDonald Pty Ltd before founding her own company Jo McDonald Cultural Heritage Management Pty Ltd. In addition to her research in the Sydney Basin, her work as a consultant on the Cumberland Plain in Western Sydney, which focused on the excavation and management of open stone artefact sites, was particularly influential. As a consultant, McDonald was also involved in the excavation and subsequent research into Narrabeen Man.

McDonald has worked at the University of Western Australia as the Director of the Centre for Rock Art Research + Management since 2012. In that same year she was appointed as the Rio Tinto Chair of Rock Art Studies, which she held until 2017.

== Research ==
During her time as a consultant, McDonald was involved in The Canning Stock Route: Rock Art and Jukurrpa Project, an Australian Research Council (ARC) Linkage Project focused on documenting the cultural heritage along the Canning Stock Route in collaboration with local Aboriginal communities.

In 2012, McDonald published with Peter Veth A Companion to Rock Art, an edited volume that provided the first global synthesis of rock art research.

McDonald's research has focused on the archaeology and rock art of people living in deserts and arid regions, particularly the Western Desert of Australia and the Great Basin of America. From 2012 to 2014, she held an ARC Future Fellowship exploring how rock art changed in these two arid areas in response to environmental changes.

Together with Peter Veth, McDonald has undertaken research into the relationship between rock art and social networks in Pilbara and the Western Desert in 2013. Further work in the Western Desert gave clues into the ways in which groups of people moved across the landscape due to environmental changes and the ways that movement can be examined through their rock art.

McDonald's current research has focused on the archaeology and rock art of the Dampier Archipelago (known to local Aboriginal communities as Murujuga), especially as a Chief Investigator of the Murujuga - Dynamics of the Dreaming project funded by the ARC from 2014 to 2016. McDonald has also contributed to the recent push towards the World Heritage listing of Murujuga.

== Awards ==
In 2016, McDonald was awarded the Rhys Jones Medal for Outstanding Contribution to Australian Archaeology by the Australian Archaeological Association (AAA); the association's top honour. And in 2018, McDonald was awarded the Bruce Veitch Award for Excellence in Indigenous Engagement, which is awarded annually by the AAA "to any individual or group who has undertaken an archaeological or cultural heritage project which has produced a significant outcome for Indigenous interests". McDonald is also a life member of the Australian Association of Consulting Archaeologists Inc. (AACAI) and served as President of AACAI from 1993 to 1997.

== Select publications ==
=== Books ===
- A Companion to Rock Art - edited volume with Peter Veth. Wiley-Blackwell. 2012. ISBN 9781444334241
- McDonald, Jo (2008). Dreamtime Superhighway : An Analysis of Sydney Basin Rock Art and Prehistoric Information Exchange (PDF). ANU E Press. doi:10.26530/OAPEN_459083. ISBN 9781921536175.

=== Chapters ===
- "Archaic Faces to Headdresses: The Changing Role of Rock Art Across the Arid Zone". Desert Peoples. John Wiley & Sons, Ltd: 116–141. (2008) doi:10.1002/9780470774632.ch7

=== Articles ===
- "I Must Go Down to the Seas Again: or, What Happens When the Sea Comes to You? : Murujuga Rock Art as an Environmental Indicator for Australia’s north-west", Quaternary International, vol. 385, no. 22, pp. 124–35. (2015) doi:10.1016/j.quaint.2014.10.056
- "The Archaeology of Memory: The Recursive Relationship of Martu Rock Art and Place". Anthropological Forum 23(4): 367-386. (2013) doi:10.1080/00664677.2013.843444 (With Peter Veth)
- "Rock Art in Arid Landscapes: Pilbara and Western Desert Petroglyphs". Australian Archaeology 77: 66-81. (2013) doi:10.1080/03122417.2013.11681980 (With Peter Veth)
- "Dampier Archipelago petroglyphs: archaeology, scientific values and National Heritage Listing". Archaeology in Oceania. 44 (S1): 49–69. (December 2009) doi:10.1002/j.1834-4453.2009.tb00068.x (With Peter Veth)
- "Symbolic behaviour and the peopling of the southern arc route to Australia". Quaternary International. 202 (1–2): 59–68. (June 2009) doi:10.1016/j.quaint.2008.10.002 (With Jane Balme, Iain Davidson, Nicola Stern, and Peter Veth)
