= Andrée Rosenfeld =

Archaeologist, rock art scholar (1934–2008)

Andrée Jeanne Rosenfeld FAHA
- Born: 1934
- Died: 2008 (aged 73–74)
- Known for: Rock Art Research

Academic background
- Doctoral advisor: Frederick Zeuner

Academic work
- Discipline: Archaeology
- Institutions: British Museum;Australian National University

Andrée Jeanne Rosenfeld FAHA (1934–2008) was an archaeologist specialising in rock art.

== Early life and education ==
Rosenfeld was born in 1934 in Liège, Belgium, the daughter of the physicists Yvonne and Léon Rosenfelds. After the Second World War the family moved to Manchester. She studied for a BSc in physics at Bristol University in 1956, where she took up caving. Rosenfeld studied for a Master of Science and then obtained a PhD in 1960 from the Institute of Archaeology, with a thesis on the sedimentology of caves from sites in Devon supervised by Frederick Zeuner. During her postgraduate research she excavated the palaeolithic cave sites in Devon, Torbryan and Three Holes Cave.

== Career ==
After completing her PhD research she worked at the Institute of Archaeology as Zeuner's research assistant. Her first book, The Inorganic Raw Materials of Antiquity, built upon the technical skills learnt in this period. Rosenfeld was appointed as a curator of Palaeolithic collections at the British Museum in 1964, where she was based until 1972, and guest-lectured at the Department of Anthropology, UCL. During the 1960s she worked at Arcy-sur-Curé alongside Leroi-Gourhan. She was considered as a European expert in archaeological science and provided advice on microscopic study of use-wear. She undertook research on the Magdalenian artefacts within the British Museum's collections.

In 1972 she moved to Australia, with her partner Peter Ucko, where she taught at the recently established Department of Archaeology and Anthropology at the Australian National University (ANU) from 1973. During her time at ANU, Rosenfeld commenced several crucial projects for the development of Australian archaeology, where she applied her previous scientific training and research experiences. Her excavations at the Early Man Site in Cape York Peninsula, Queensland provided the first evidence that rock art in Australia was Pleistocene in date, and made the methodological development of linking excavated evidence with rock art, described as a "milestone in the establishment of rock art research in Australia". Her 1985 book, commissioned by the Australian Heritage Commission, was the founding study of rock art conservation in Australia. Rosenfeld's scholarship focused on both methodological and theoretical interpretations of rock art, and research in the late 1990s focused on the social context of rock art.

Her teaching career at ANU included establishing courses in the archaeology of art and material culture, and she is noted for incorporating ethnography into the study of art. During her career she held visiting fellowships at the Getty Research Institute in Los Angeles in 1988, and Oxford University in 1989. She retired from her position as Reader at ANU in 1997, and moved to Rathdowney in Queensland where she enjoyed an active retirement. She died from pancreatic cancer in 2008.

=== Legacy ===
Her major contribution in archaeology was in the field of rock art research, and the application of scientific techniques to the study of art. Rosenfeld was described as a "rigorous and generous scholar, and a lovely, gentle person" and "an enthusiastic and accomplished teacher". She taught a number of students who became leading archaeologists, such as Jo McDonald, Paul Tacon, Howard Morphy, Robert Layton, and Claire Smith. Through her supervision of postgraduate students, a flourishing of rock art research took place in Australia in the late 1980s and 1990s.

== Honours and awards ==
The Andrée Rosenfeld Chair of Rock Art was established at ANU in recognition of her service to the university. A portrait of Andrée by Robin Wallace-Crabbe and Diane Fogwell is in the collection of the National Portrait Gallery. Rosenfeld was elected as a Fellow of the Australian Academy of the Humanities.
