= Narrabeen Man =

4,000-year-old skeleton of an Aboriginal Australian discovered in 2005

Coordinates: 33°42′32″S 151°18′08″E

Narrabeen Man is the name given to a 4,000-year-old skeleton of a tall Aboriginal Australian man found in Narrabeen, a suburb of the Northern Beaches region of Sydney, in January 2005.

== Discovery and dating ==
The Narrabeen Man was found by contractors digging for electricity cables near the corners of Octavia Street and Ocean Street, Narrabeen. A forensic investigation was undertaken and bone samples were sent to Lawrence Livermore National Laboratory in California to determine the age of the remains. Radiocarbon dating of the bone suggested an age of around 4,000 years for the skeleton. The Narrabeen man was suspected to be 30–40 years old when he died. This is recorded to be Sydney's oldest aboriginal skeleton and is Australia's third oldest skeletal remains behind Mungo Man and Mungo Lady.

An archaeological dig at the site revealed that Narrabeen Man was found in a posture unlike a tribal ceremonial burial. Rather than lying on his front with hands by the side or across the chest, the Narrabeen Man was on his side with one arm across his head. Further investigation of the skeletal remains revealed evidence of spear ends found embedded into his vertebrae and near other parts of the body. This indicated death by spearing and suggested to archaeologist Dr Jo McDonald that Narrabeen Man was perhaps the first physical evidence of ritual murder in Australia.

== Weapons ==
The spear barbs found in the skeleton were most likely from what post-settlement Europeans sometimes called "death spears". Although they may have been used in ritual punishments, it seems likely the same type of spears were used for killing game, such as kangaroos. These spears have sharp flakes of stone, such as silcrete and quartz, embedded side by side into resin along the head of the spear, creating a serrated edge behind the point. The pieces of rock tend to break free from the resin and remain in the flesh of the victim. Spear barbs like these date to the Holocene period, and in Australia are referred to as "backed artefacts" meaning microliths or "bladelets" having retouched edges.

== Physical description ==
Further examination revealed that Narrabeen Man was approximately 183 cm (6 ft) tall, estimated from the length of his limbs, 30–40 years old. His height was above average for Aboriginal men at this time. It is also speculated that Narrabeen Man was not from a tribe from the greater Sydney region, as his two front teeth were not removed - in line with a regional initiation rite at the time of European settlement (unless the rite was introduced locally in more recent times than Narrabeen Man's demise).

== Reasons for death ==
There is no conclusive evidence as to why he was killed. A Narrabeen cultural heritage officer, Allen Madden, suggested in 2008 that a ritualistic murder of this type represents the farthest extent of tribal law, indicating that his offence, whatever it was, must have been serious.

Narrabeen Man's remains are currently under care at Sydney University's Shellshear Museum.
