= Léon Rosenfeld =

Belgian physicist (1904–1974)

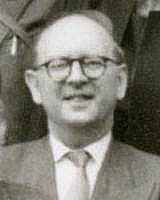
- Rosenfeld in 1963
- Born: 14 August 1904; Charleroi, Belgium
- Died: 23 March 1974 (aged 69)
- Citizenship: Belgium
- Education: University of Liège (PhD, 1926)
- Known for: Belinfante–Rosenfeld stress–energy tensor, coined the term lepton
- Spouse: Yvonne Cambresier
- Children: Andrée, Jean
- Awards: Francqui Prize (1949)

Signature
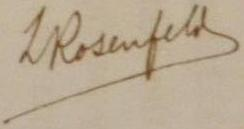

Léon Jacques Henri Constant Rosenfeld (French: [ʁɔzɛnfɛld]; 14 August 1904 in Charleroi – 23 March 1974) was a Belgian physicist and a communist activist.

== Early life and education ==
Rosenfeld was born into a secular Jewish family. He was a polyglot who knew eight or nine languages and was fluent in at least five of them.

Rosenfeld obtained a PhD at the University of Liège in 1926, and he was a close collaborator of the physicist Niels Bohr from 1930 until Bohr's death in 1962.

== Career ==
Rosenfeld published in 1930 the first systematic Hamiltonian approach to Lagrangian models that possess a local gauge symmetry, which predates by two decades the work by Paul Dirac and Peter Bergmann. Rosenfeld contributed to a wide range of physics fields, from statistical physics and quantum field theory to astrophysics. Along with Frederik Belinfante, he derived the Belinfante–Rosenfeld stress–energy tensor. He also founded the journal Nuclear Physics and coined the term lepton.

== Personal life ==
In 1933, Rosenfeld married Yvonne Cambresier, who was one of the first women to obtain a Physics PhD from a European university. They had a daughter, Andrée Rosenfeld (1934–2008) and a son, Jean Rosenfeld.

== Awards and honors ==
Rosenfeld held chairs at multiple universities: Liège, Utrecht, Manchester, and Copenhagen.

He was elected to membership of the Manchester Literary and Philosophical Society in 1948.

In 1949 Léon Rosenfeld was awarded the Francqui Prize for Exact Sciences.

== Works ==
- Rosenfeld, Léon (1948). Nuclear Forces. North-Holland.
- Rosenfeld, Léon (1951). Theory Of Electrons. North-Holland.
- Bohr, Niels; Rosenfeld, Léon (1933). "Zur Frage der Messbarkeit der elektromagnetischen Feldgrössen" [On the Question of the Measurability of Electromagnetic Field Quantities]. Royal_Danish_Academy_of_Sciences_and_Letters (in German): 123–166 – via Translated from German (1996) Niels Bohr Collected Works. Vol. 7. North–Holland: Amsterdam. Demonstrated the logical consistency of quantum electrodynamics.
- Rosenfeld, L. (1971). "Men and Ideas in the History of Atomic Theory". Archive for History of Exact Sciences. 7 (2): 69–90. ISSN 0003-9519.
