= Karim Vahed =

British entomologist

- Education: University of Exeter; University of Nottingham
- Partner: Kate Bellis
- Children: 1
- Scientific career
- Fields: Entomology; Orthopterology
- Workplaces: University of Derby Buglife
- Thesis: The evolution and function of the spermatophylax in bushcrickets (Orthoptera:Tettigoniidae). (1994)
- Academic advisors: Francis Gilbert
- Website: https://www.derby.ac.uk/staff/karim-vahed/

Karim Vahed FRES is a British entomologist. He is a professor of entomology and England manager at invertebrate conservation charity Buglife, and is an expert in crickets and bushcrickets (katydids).

== Education and career ==
Vahed has been fascinated by insects since childhood. He studied biological sciences at the University of Exeter and did a PhD at the University of Nottingham on the function and evolution of nuptial feeding in bushcrickets, focusing on the role of the spermatophylax. In 1993 he joined the University of Derby, eventually becoming Professor of Entomology. and Programme Leader for the masters programme in conservation biology. In 2022 he moved to Buglife to become England Manager.

== Research ==
Vahed's research looks in particular at the sexual behaviour of the Orthoptera order of insects, the crickets and bush crickets and related groups.

He discovered a group of bushcricket species Anonconotus sp. that are able to mate many times without need to recover. He has studied the behaviour of giving nuptial gifts in insects. His team also discovered a cricket species Platycleis affinis in which the testes accounted for 14% of the insect's body mass, the largest percentage of any animal at the time of the study. The large testes enable the insect to mate more frequently.

Vahed is involved in conservation of rare orthopterans and monitors the rare scaly cricket (Pseudomogoplistes vicentae) on the UK mainland as well as on the Channel Islands including a potential new colony of the species on Guernsey. On Guernsey he performs surveys of the cricket with volunteers from La Societe Guernesiaise. He has campaigned against making the Guernsey site a waste dump. He also studies the mating behaviour of the scaly cricket.

In 2014 Vahed was interviewed on BBC Four television documentary Spider House by Tim Cockerill, in 2019 he appeared on The British Garden: Life And Death On Your Lawn with Chris Packham.

== Awards and honours ==
Vahed is a Fellow of the Royal Entomological Society, of the Royal Society of Biology, of the Linnean Society and is a Senior Fellow of the Higher Education Academy.

== Personal life ==
Vahed and his partner, Kate Bellis, a photographer, have one son.

== Selected publications ==
- Vahed, Karim (1998). "The function of nuptial feeding in insects: a review of empirical studies". Biological Reviews. 73 (1): 43–78. doi:10.1017/S0006323197005112. ISSN 1469-185X.
- Vahed, Karim (2007). "All that Glisters is not Gold: Sensory Bias, Sexual Conflict and Nuptial Feeding in Insects and Spiders". Ethology. 113 (2): 105–127. Bibcode:2007Ethol.113..105V. doi:10.1111/j.1439-0310.2006.01312.x. ISSN 1439-0310.
- Vahed, Karim; Parker, Darren J. (2012). "The Evolution of Large Testes: Sperm Competition or Male Mating Rate?". Ethology. 118 (2): 107–117. Bibcode:2012Ethol.118..107V. doi:10.1111/j.1439-0310.2011.01991.x. ISSN 1439-0310.
- Lehmann, Gerlind U. C.; Gilbert, James DJ; Vahed, Karim; Lehmann, Arne W. (2017). "Male genital titillators and the intensity of post-copulatory sexual selection across bushcrickets". Behavioral Ecology. 28 (5): 1198–1205. doi:10.1093/beheco/arx094. ISSN 1045-2249.
