= Frederick Zeuner =

German palaeontologist and archaeologist

Frederick Everard Zeuner (8 March 1905 – 5 November 1963) was a German palaeontologist and geological archaeologist who specialized on the Pleistocene epoch. He was a contemporary of Gordon Childe at the Institute of Archaeology of the University of London. Zeuner proposed a detailed scheme of correlation and dating of European climatic and prehistoric cultural events on the basis of Milankovitch cycles. He also worked on Orthopteran insects, with the bush cricket genus Zeuneriana named after him. He has been considered as a pioneer of environmental archaeology.

== Life and work ==
Zeuner was born in Berlin, Germany. He studied at Berlin followed by Tubingen and finally received his Ph.D. from the University of Breslau in 1927. At Breslau he was a student of Walther Soergel. After working as a Privatdozent at the University of Breslau from 1927-1930 and a lecturer in geology at the University of Freiburg from 1931-34 he emigrated to England after being dismissed from university because his wife Etta was Jewish. He was aided by the Academic Assistance Council (founded by William Beveridge later known as the Council for Assisting Refugee Academics - CARA) worked as a research associate at the British Museum (Natural History) from 1934-36. During World War II he worked with the Anti-Locust Research Centre. Zeuner became a lecturer in geochronology at the University of London's Institute of Archaeology from 1936 to 1945 thanks to assistance from Mortimer Wheeler. He received a D. Sc. from the university of London in 1942 for his work on fossil Ensifera. In 1944 he was promoted to a professorship. From 1946 to 1963 he was professor, the first in Environmental Archaeology, and head of environmental archaeology at the University of London's Institute of Archaeology, where postgraduate students included Andrée Rosenfeld. His most influential book was The Pleistocene Period (1945). In it he made use of chronology estimation based on sea-levels, glacial moraine, loess and river terraces. This was followed by another book on Dating the Past (1946). He was involved in examinations of excavated material from the Neolithic and he made use of radiocarbon dating. This would lead to another major work A History of Domesticated Animals (1963). He was a member of the Geologische Vereinigung in Germany and was admitted to the German Academy of Natural Scientists Leopoldina (1952). He was also a member of the Royal Anthropological Institute of Great Britain and Ireland. He died from a cardiac arrest.

== Selected publications ==
- Dating the Past: An Introduction to Geochronology. London: Methuen, 1946.
- Prehistory in India: Four Broadcast Talks on Early Man. India: Deccan College Postgraduate and Research Institute, 1951.
- The Pleistocene Period: Its Climate, Chronology, and Faunal Successions. Hutchinson Scientific & Technical, 1959.
- "Fossil insects from the Lower Lias of Charmouth, Dorset" in Bulletin of the British Museum (Natural History), Geology, 7:155-171 [M. Clapham/J. Karr/M. Clapham]
- A history of domesticated animals. New York: Harper & Row, 1963.
