= Digging for Britain =

British documentary series about UK archaeology

- Title card
- Genre: Documentary
- Presented by: Alice Roberts; Tori Herridge
- Country of origin: United Kingdom
- Original language: English
- No. of series: 13
- No. of episodes: 64

Production
- Running time: 59 minutes
- Production companies: Rare TV (formerly known as 360 Production (series 1-7)) for BBC (in association with Northern Ireland Screen)

Original release
- Network: BBC Two
- Release: 19 August 2010 – present

Digging for Britain is a British television series focused on last and current year archaeology. The series is made by 360 Production (now Rare TV) for the BBC and is presented by Alice Roberts. It was first aired on 19 August 2010.

The series focuses on archaeological excavations and research in the United Kingdom, both at new sites and those already well known to science. Filming has taken place in many parts of the country.

== Production ==
The first series consisted of four episodes, initially broadcast on BBC Two in August and September 2010. A second series of four episodes was broadcast in September 2011. Each episodes of first two series had covered archaeology of specific period. The programme returned as a series of three episodes on BBC Four in February 2015, covering the previous summer's investigations in a specific geographical region of the United Kingdom in each episode. Each episode of this series was hosted in a regional museum. The same format as in series 3 was adopted for series 4 and 5, which first aired in March and December 2016, respectively. There was also a programme Digging for Ireland linked to the series which had the same format and presenters as series 5; it was broadcast in February 2015. A sixth series of the programme began airing in November 2017, returning to the four-episode format (covering three geographical regions plus one special theme). This structure was retained for series 7 and 8, which aired in November 2018 and 2019 respectively. Four episodes titled The Greatest Discoveries aired in 2020. It returned for its 9th series in January 2022.

Since series 3, with exception of series 5, the programme was co-presented in various forms. Some presenters are former members of the Time Team crew (as is Roberts). The series 3 and 4 by archaeologist Matt Williams (who also presented some Time Team episodes). (Roberts and Williams also presented Digging for Ireland.) Raksha Dave (archaeologist in Time Team) series 7. The archaeologist and academic Naoíse Mac Sweeney was a presenter in series 8. Series 9 features historian Onyeka Nubia and archaeologists Cat Jarman and Stuart Prior in some episodes as presenters. Romani archaeologist John-Henry Phillips, co-presenter of Channel 4's The Great British Dig, appeared in series 12. Its 13th series commenced January 2026, with Tori Herridge and Meg Russell appearing as a co-presenter.

On 5 June 2026, the BBC announced that Tori Herridge will be the show's main presenter, following Alice Robert's decision to leave at the end of series 13.

The song Coins for the Eyes was written for series 9 by Johnny Flynn and Robert Macfarlane.

== Series overview ==
Series	Episodes	Originally released		UK viewers (millions)
Series	Episodes	First released	Last released	UK viewers (millions)
1	4	19 August 2010	10 September 2010	2.51
2	4	9 September 2011	30 September 2011	—N/a
3	4 (Note: Includes one special episode.)	3 February 2015	23 February 2015	—N/a
4	3	10 March 2016	24 March 2016	—N/a
5	3	6 December 2016	20 December 2016	—N/a
6	4	22 November 2017	13 December 2017	—N/a
7	4	28 November 2018	19 December 2018	—N/a
8	4	20 November 2019	11 December 2019	—N/a
Special	4	17 March 2020	7 April 2020	—N/a
9	6	4 January 2022	13 January 2022	—N/a
10	6	1 January 2023	12 February 2023	—N/a
11	6	2 January 2024	11 January 2024	—N/a
12	6	7 January 2025	16 January 2025	—N/a
13	6	7 January 2026	5 February 2026	—N/a

== Episodes ==
=== Series 1 (2010) ===
No. in season	Title	Directed by	Producer(s)	Series Producer	Original release date	UK viewers (millions)
1	"The Romans"	John Hayes-Fisher	John Hayes-Fisher	Not listed	19 August 2010	2.75
Sites and archaeology featured: Fort of Vindolanda (director of the excavation Andrew Birley); Vicus outside Vindolanda (director of the excavation Justin Blake); Sudbury Roman lantern (commentary by Caroline McDonald); Revaluation of 1912 dig near Hambleden called Yewden (original finder miss Janet Glassbrook, original excavator Alfred Heneage Cocks, researcher Jill Eyers, commentary by Brett Thorn); Yewden infant bones (rediscoverers Jill Eyers and Brett Thorn, analysis Simon Mays); 1st/2nd century Roman burial and potential Iron Age village excavated during the construction of the East Kent Access Road on the Isle of Thanet (director of the excavation Andrew Fitzpatrick); Iron Age excavation near Bere Regis (co-directors of the excavation Paul Cheetham and Miles Russel); Frome Roman coins hoard(finder Dave Crisp, conservator Pippa Pearce, roman coins experts Roger Bland and Sam Moorhead); Gallo-Roman Shipwreck Asterix found at St Peter Port harbour, Guernsey (commentary by Jason Monaghan); Temple of Jupiter Dolichenus in Vindolanda (commentary by Andrew Birley)
2	"Prehistory"	Serena Davies	Serena Davies	Not listed	26 August 2010	2.34
Sites and archaeology featured: Almost million years old flint tools near Happisburgh (director of the excavation Nick Ashton); Creswell Crags Cave Art (commentary by Ian Wall); Links of Noltland Late Neolithic Settlement, Westray, Orkney (director of the excavation Hazel Moore); Culduthel Man (curated by Alison Sheridan, research of beaker people Janet Montgomery and Jane Evans); Salcombe B Middle Bronze Age Shipwreck (dive supervised by Dave Parham, curator Ben Roberts); Grave of the chieftain (cist burial) from Forteviot (researcher Kenny Brophy)
3	"Anglo-Saxons"	Sarah Jobling	Sarah Jobling	Not listed	2 September 2010	2.45
Sites and archaeology featured: Anglo-Saxon 5th century grave goods excavated in the 19th century in Dorchester on Thames (curator Helena Hamerow); Staffordshire Hoard (commentary by Sam Newton); Anglo-Saxon fortress remains at Bamburgh Castle (director of the excavation Graeme Young); Anglo-Saxon village excavation at Lanton Quarry (director of the excavation Clive Waddington); Saxon graves excavated during the construction of the East Kent Access Road on the Isle of Thanet; Conservation of objects found at The Meads Anglo-Saxon cemetery carried out by volunteers at Conservation Science Investigations: Sittingbourne (conservator Dana Goodburn-Brown, commentary by Andrew Richardson); Anglo-Saxon cemetery excavation at Sutton Hoo commissioned in 2000 by the National Trust (commentary by Chris Fern); Anglo-Saxon nunnery at Berkeley Castle (co-directors of the excavation Stuart Prior and Mark Horton); Bowl Hole Anglo-Saxon cemetery excavated near Bamburgh Castle between 1998 and 2007 (commentatory by Sarah Groves); Eadgyth's tomb (commentary by Mark Horton, strontium analysis Alister Pike); Anglo-Saxon swords from Bamburgh Castle (commentary by Graeme Young)
4	"The Tudors"	James Gray	James Gray	Not listed	10 September 2010	N/A
Sites and archaeology featured: Foundations of The Theatre at Shoreditch (director of the excavation Jo Lyon); Palace of Placentia at Greenwich (director of the excavation Nathalie Cohen); Mary Rose shipwreck (commentary by Christopher Dobbs, skeletal remains curator Alex Hildred); Strata Florida Abbey ruins (co-directors of the excavation David Austin Jemma Bezant); The Gresham Ship (researcher Gustav Milne); New Place Shakespeare residence foundations in Stratford-upon-Avon (organizer Richard Kemp, leading archaeologist Kevin Colls); Artifacts of Elizabethan theaters and bear-baiting arenas(commentary by Julian Bowsher)

=== Series 2 (2011) ===
No. in season	Title	Directed by	Producer(s)	Series Producer	Original release date	UK viewers (millions)
1	"Britannia"	Tim Robinson	Tim Robinson	Not listed	9 September 2011	N/A
Sites and archaeology featured: Folkestone Roman Villa, a potential seat of a Classis Britannica commander (director of the excavation Lesly Hardy, site supervisor Andrew Richardson); Mysterious remains of 97 Roman newborns near Hambleden (bone experts Simon Mays, and Kate Robson-Brown, DNA experts Keri Brown, researcher Jill Eyers, artefact curator Brett Thorn); Roman settlement near Exeter (finders of 2009 coins metaldetectorists Jim Wills and Denis Hughing, director of the excavation Danielle Wootton); Caerleon amphitheatre's warehouse (commentary Peter Guest and Penny Hill); Bere Regis romanized building and burial (director of the excavation Miles Russell); Crosby Garrett Helmet (commentary Ralph Jackson and Andrew Mackay); Binchester Roman Fort along the Dere Street Roman road between Durham and York (director of the excavation David Petts)
2	"Invaders"	Sarah Jobling	Sarah Jobling	Not listed	16 September 2011	N/A
Sites and archaeology featured: Excavation at the site of Horgabost on Harris island (director of the excavation Kevin Colls); Lewis Chessmen (commentary by David Caldwell); Monastery on Harris (director of the excavation John Hunter); Hungate, York (director of the excavation Peter Connelly); Possible victims of St Brice's Day massacre (commentary by Ceri Falys); Vale of York Hoard (commentary by Natalie McCaul); Udal excavation (researcher Beverley Ballin-Smith); Brough of Deerness Viking settlement (director of the excavation James Barrett); Scar Boat Burial (commentary by Julie Gibson)
3	"Age of Bronze and Iron"	Emma Parkins	Emma Parkins	Not listed	23 September 2011	N/A
Sites and archaeology featured: Cladh Hallan project's burials, South Uist (commentary by Christie Willis and Mark Parker Pearson); Cambridgeshire quarry (director of the excavation Christopher Evans); Iron Age Iceni timber trackway excavated along the river Waveney near Geldeston (commentary Henry Chapman); Burrough Hill Iron Age Hillfort (director of the excavation John Thomas); Fin Cop fort (commentary by Clive Waddington); Chiseldon cauldrons (commentary by Alex Baldwin); Excavation at Calleva Atrebatum (director of the excavation Mike Fulford, archeobotanist Lisa Ludwick, ceramic commentary by Amanda Clarke)
4	"Ice and Stone"	James Gray	James Gray	Not listed	30 September 2011	N/A
Sites and archaeology featured: Stonehenge's bluestones origin site (commentary by Tim Darvill and Geoff Wainwright); Neolithic Banks Chambered Tomb (Tomb of the Otters) in South Ronaldsay (commentary by Dan Lee); Daer valley mesolithic-neolithic transition flint tools (director of the excavation Tam Ward); Star Carr mesolithic village (researcher Nicky Milner); Paleolithic tools Les Varines, Jersey (finder of the site Peter Bohea, director of the excavation Chantal Conneller); Gough's Cave human remains (commentary Silvia Bello); Neanderthal tools from La Cotte (co-directors of the excavation Matt Pope and Becky Scott)

=== Series 3 (2015) ===
No. in season	Title	Directed by	Producer(s)	Series Producer	Original release date	UK viewers (millions)
1	"East"	Edward Hart (Note: Credited as Studio Director.)	Alex Rowson	Catherine Ross, Sarah Jobling	3 February 2015	N/A
Hosted at Norwich Castle Museum Sites and archaeology featured: Must Farm Bronze Age settlement fishing industry (researcher Mark Knight); Colchester Roman house (commentary by Philip Crummy and Adam Whiteman); Oakington Anglo-Saxon Cemetery (director of the excavation Duncan Sayer); Lyminge Anglo-Saxon royal hall (director of the excavation Gabor Thomas); Basing House new house fort (co-directors of the excavation Chris Elmer, Dave Allen, Gareth Beale and Nicole Beale); Silchester Roman Town - Calleva Atrebatum (co-director of the excavation Mike Fulford)
2	"West"	Edward Hart	Bernadette Ross	Catherine Ross, Sarah Jobling	10 February 2015	N/A
Hosted at Dorset County Museum Sites and archaeology featured: Barrow Clump burial ground (co-director of the excavation Richard Osgood); Durotriges Big Dig Project, Winterborne Kingston (commentary by Paul Cheetham and Miles Russell); Chedworth Roman Villa (director of the excavation Martin Papworth); The leper hospital of Saint Mary Magdalen near Winchester (director of the excavation Simon Roffey); Forest of Dean Bronze Age child bracelets (finders Lee Todd and Steve Moodie, researcher Neil Wilkin); Ipplepen Roman cemetery (director of the excavation Danielle Wootton)
3	"North"	Edward Hart	Denis Minihan, Chris Nikkel	Catherine Ross	17 February 2015	N/A
Hosted at National Museum of Scotland Sites and archeology featured: Neolithic site of Ness of Brodgar (director of the excavation Nick Card); Roman Barracks at Binchester Roman Fort (director of the excavation David Petts); Roman altar monument at Alauna castrum in Maryport (director of the excavation Tony Wilmot, commentary by Ian Haynes); Mesolithic butchery place at Flixton Island (director of the excavation Nicky Milner); Bronze Age well site on Sanday, Pictish carvings in Jonathan's Cave near East Wemyss, and the rescue of an Iron Age site on North Uist (commentary Tom Dawson); Viking boat burial at Ardnamurchan (commentary by Hannah Cobb); John Conyers' feasting hall at Boroughbridge (commentary by Erik Matthews); Potential Pictish royal place at Rhynie (director of the excavation Gordon Noble)
1 (Note: Special Episode.)	"Digging For Ireland"	Edward Hart	Chris Nikkel	Catherine Ross	23 February 2015	N/A
Hosted at Ulster Museum Sites and archaeology featured: Plantation of Ulster at Dunluce Castle (commentary by Andrew Gault); Town of estate workers near Dunluce Castle (director of the excavation Grace McAlister); Girona ship of the Spanish Armada (commentary by Greer Ramsey); Battle of the Ford of the Biscuits by the River Arney (researcher Paul Logue); Bronze Age cemetery near Enniscorthy (director of the excavation Eoin Grogan); Corrard Torc (commentary by Greer Ramsey); Moydrum Man bog body (researcher Ned Kelly, commentary by Gabriel Cooney); Excavation at Hill of Ward (director of the excavation Caitriona Moore, osteoarchaeologist Abigail Ash); Boats from Lough Corrib (commentary by Karl Brady); Viking from the River Blackwater (commentary by Greer Ramsey); Spike Island burial excavation (Barra O Donnabhain)

=== Series 4 (2016) ===
No. in season	Title	Directed by	Producer(s)	Series Producer	Original release date	UK viewers (millions)
1	"West"	Edward Hart	Gemma Hagen, Alex Rowson	Edward Hart	10 March 2016	N/A
Throughout episode finds from The Salisbury Museum are shown Sites and archaeology featured: Sweat lodge in Marden Henge (director of the excavation Jim Leary); Beaker people burial in entrance of Wilsford Henge (director of the excavation Jim Leary); Amesbury Archer (commentary by Adrian Green); Iron Age settlement of Winterborne Kingston (director of the excavation Miles Russell); Medieval town of Trellech (director of the excavation Stuart Wilson); New cave entrance of Kents Cavern (direction of the excavation Rob Dinnis); Stone Age colonizers camp on the Island of Jersey (director of the excavation Matt Pope); Staffordshire Hoard conservation (conservators Lizzie Miller and Kayleigh Fuller); Replica of the sword from Staffordshire hoard (commentary by Chris Fern); Anglo-Saxon Ford warrior (commentary by Adrian Green)
2	"East"	Edward Hart	Gemma Hagen, Alex Rowson	Edward Hart	17 March 2016	N/A
Throughout episode finds from Museum of London are shown Sites and archaeology featured: Waterloo battlefield (commentary by Tony Pollard, Charles Foinette and Phil Harding); Waterloo teeth dentistry (commentary by Jelena Bekvalac); Lenborough Hoard (finder Paul Coleman, commentary Gareth Williams); London's Crossrail construction at Liverpool Street station excavates the 17th century Bedlam burial ground (director of the excavation Jay Carver, commentary by Don Walker); Liverpool Station's beheaded Roman victims (commentary by Don Walker); Tombstone of Claudia Martina (commentary Caroline McDonald); Wreck of HMS London (commentary by Daniel Pascoe); Nelson's navy skeleton (commentary by Jelena Bakvalac); Battle of Britain's Hawker Hurricane wreck pieces (involved in the excavation was Richard Osgood)
3	"North"	Edward Hart	Gemma Hagen, Alex Rowson	Edward Hart	24 March 2016	N/A
Throughout episode finds from Yorkshire Museum are shown Sites and archaeology featured: Star Carr mesolithic antler headdress (commentary by Matalie McCaul); Mesolithic pandant with markings (commentary Nicky Milner); Iron Age roundhouses at the Black Loch of Myrton lochside village (director of the excavation Anne Crone); Galloway Hoard - Viking treasure found near Dumfries (finder Derek McLennan, commentary by Richard Welander); Roman fort at Ribchester (director of the excavation Duncan Sayer); Pictish fort at Dunnicaer (director of the excavation Gordon Noble); Pictish fort at Rhynie (director of the excavation Gordon Noble); Iron Age Arras cemetery of square burrows of Arras culture (director of the excavation Paula Ware)

=== Series 5 (2016) ===
No. in season	Title	Directed by	Producer(s)	Series Producer	Original release date	UK viewers (millions)
1	"West"	Graham Cooper	Gemma Hagen, Alex Rowson	Graham Cooper (Note: Listed in end credits as Series Producer/Director.)	6 December 2016	N/A
Throughout episode finds from Bristol Museum are shown Sites and archaeology featured: Bulford Henges late Neolithic double henge monument (director of the excavation Phil Harding); Training trenches for the Battle of Somme in Perham Down (director of the excavation Richard Osgood); Grouville Hoard of Coriosolite coins from Jersey (lead conservator Neil Mahrer); Thornbury Hoard (commentary by Gail Boyle); Burials outside Merlin's Cave (finder Clyde Hoare, co-directors of the excavation Tim Hoverd and Andrew Chamberlain); High status building from Tintagel (properties curator Win Scutt, director of the excavation Jacky Nowakowski); Whitesands Bay Dark Ages cemetery (co-directors of the excavation Ken Murphy and Marion Shiner)
2	"North"	Gemma Hagen	Gemma Hagen	Graham Cooper	13 December 2016	N/A
Throughout episode finds from National Museum of Scotland are shown Sites and archaeology featured: Roman siege forts at Burnswark Hill (director of the excavation Andrew Nicholson); 14th century cemeteries at Thornton Abbey (director of the excaation Pete Townend); Man-made stone islands on Loch Arnish, Loch Langabhat and Loch Bhorghastail, Isle of Lewis (co-directors of dives Duncan Garrow and Fraser Sturt); Shulishader axe (commentary by Alison Sheridan); Potential location of Anglo-Saxon monastery on Lindisfarne Island (co-directors of the excavation David Petts and Brendon Wilkins); Hunterston Brooch (commentary by Alice Blackwell); Cairn broch on island of South Ronaldsay (director of the excavation Martin Carruthers); Anglo-Saxon settlement at Little Carlton (finder Graham Vickers, director of the excavation Hugh Willmott)
3	"East"	Alex Rowson	Alex Rowson	Graham Cooper	20 December 2016	N/A
Throughout episode finds from Canterbury Museums are shown Sites and archaeology featured: Must Farm Bronze Age settlement (director of the excavation Mark Knight); Location of Battle of Barnet (director of the excavation Sam Wilson); Great Ryburgh Anglo-Saxon cemetery (land owner Gary Boyce, director of the excavation James Fairclough); North Oxfordshire Anglo-Saxon cemetery (director of the excavation Steve Lawrence); Pendant of Queen Bertha of Kent (commentary by Andrew Richardson); Excavation of Curtain Theatre (director of the excavation Heather Knight); Watlington Hoard (finder James Mather, conservator Pippa Pearce); Viking stirrup (commentary by Craig Bowen)

=== Series 6 (2017) ===
No. in season	Title	Directed by	Producer(s)	Series Producer	Original release date	UK viewers (millions)
1	"West"	Nick Gillam-Smith	Not listed	Nick Gillam-Smith	22 November 2017	N/A
Throughout episode finds from Museum of Somerset are shown Sites and archaeology featured: Avebury Circle (co-directors of the excavation Joshua Pollard and Mark Gillings); Repton Viking winter camp (co-directors of the excavation Cat Jarman and Mark Horton); Re-evaluated age of Repton Crypt skeletal remains (commentary by Cat Jarman); Alfred Jewel (commentary by Tom Mayberry); Burrow Island burial site (director of the excavation Richard Osgood); Cat's Brain and Dorstone long barrows (director of the excavation at Cat's Brain Jim Leary, director of the excavation at Dorset Julian Thomas); Leekfrith's Iron Age torcs (finders Mark Hambleton and Joe Kania, Finds Liaison Officer Theresa Gilmore); Meonstoke Roman temple site (director of the excavation Tony King)
2	"East"	Alex Rowson	Alex Rowson	Nick Gillam-Smith	29 November 2017	N/A
Throughout episode finds from Colchester Castle Museum are shown Sites and archaeology featured: Bloomberg Roman wooden London (director of the excavation Sadie Watson); Colchester's Temple of Claudius (commentary by Glynn Davies); Rooswijk shipwreck (director of the dives Martijn Manders); Barnham site dating to the Hoxnian Interglacial with Clactonian flint tool industry and potential evidence of 400,000 years old fire use (co-directors of the excavation Nick Ashton and Simon Parfitt); Roman camp in Ebbsfleet potentially set up during Julius Caesar's first invasion of Britain in 55 BC (director of the excavation Andrew Fitspatrick); Late Iron Age Lexden Tumulus burial grave goods excavated in 1924 and held by the Colchester Castle Museum, potentially belonging to Cunobeline, who could have been a client king of Rome before the Claudian conquest (commentary by Glynn Davies); Underwater excavation of the Warship Hazardous Prize 1706 shipwreck near Bracklesham Bay (co-directors of the dives Iain Grant and Dan Pascoe)
3	"North"	Fiona Cushley	Fiona Cushley	Nick Gillam-Smith	6 December 2017	N/A
Throughout episode finds from National Museum of Scotland are shown Sites and archaeology featured: Vindolanda excavation under one of the barracks (director of the excavation Andrew Birley); Site of Iona Monastery (director of the excavation Adrian Maldonado); Carnoustie Bronze Age Village (director of the excavation Alan Hunter Blair); Balmashanner Hoard (commentary by Alison Sheridan); East Lomond Pictish settlement (director of the excavation Oliver O'Grady); The Dairsie Hoard (commentary by Fraser Hunter); Site of Siege of Newark (director of the excavation Rachel Askew); Neolithic and Bronze Age settlements on the island of Sanday (director of the excavation Jane Downes)
4	"The Horsemen of Hadrian's Wall"	James Gray	James Gray	Nick Gillam-Smith	13 December 2017	N/A
Roman cavalry special (featuring Roman cavalry tournament) Sites and archaeology featured: Milecastle 37 (commentary by Matt Simons); Barracks of Chesters Bridge Fort (commentary by Kevin Booth); Ribchester Roman Cavalry Fort (co-director Duncan Sayer); Hexham Abbey roman cavalry tombstone of Flavinus (commentary by Lindsay Allason-Jones); Vindolanda (commentary by Barbary Birley); Binchester Roman Fort's cemetery (director of the excavation David Petts); Chesters Roman Fort treasures; Hexham Abbey's Roman tombstone (Frances McIntosh)

=== Series 7 (2018) ===
No. in season	Title	Directed by	Producer(s)	Series Producer	Original release date	UK viewers (millions)
1	"North"	Karen Kirk	Karen Kirk	Nick Gillam-Smith	28 November 2018	N/A
Throughout episode finds from National Museum of Scotland are shown Sites and archaeology featured: Black Loch of Myrton settlement Iron Age village (co-directors of the excavation Anne Crone and Graeme Cavers); Spitfire AA810 in Trondheim (director of the excavation Tony Hoskins); Excavation at Vindolanda of the artifacts from 2nd century (director of the excavation Andrew Birley); Vindolanda shoes (conservation Barbara Birley, reporting by Raksha Dave); Anglo-Saxon cemetery at Scremby (finder Jim Hoff, director of the excavation Hugh Willmott); Neolithic tomb, Iron Age roundhouse, Pictish blacksmith smithy at Knowe of Swandro on the Island of Rousay (director of the excavation Julie Bond); Westness brooch-pin (commentary by Adrian Maldonado); Salford New Bailey Prison (co-directors of the excavation Rachael Reader and Mike Nevell)
2	"West"	Not listed (Note: Judging from the place in the credits might be Nick Gillam-Smith for this episode, mistitled as Series Producer only.)	Not listed	Nick Gillam-Smith	5 December 2018	N/A
Throughout episode finds from Museum of Somerset are shown Sites and archaeology featured: HMS Invincible (co-directors of the excavation Dan Pascoe and Dave Parham); Barton Farm Hessian camp (director of the excavation Paul McCulluch); Breechess of George II (commentary by Tom Mayberry); Wessex Archaeology examination of skeletons exhumed from a 19th century paupers' graveyard at the site of London's New Covent Garden Market (osteologist Kirsten Dinwiddy, reporting by Raksha Dave); Excavation of a bathhouse near the Silchester Roman Town (director of the excavation Mike Fulford); Mosaic of Aeneas (commentary by Amal Khreisheh); Bath Abbey excavation (director of the excavation Cai Mason); Additional skeletons from pauper's graveyard (commentary by Rachel Williams, reporting by Raksha Dave); Barrow Clump Anglo-Saxon cemetery (director of the excavation Richard Osgood)
3	"East"	Louise Ord	Louise Ord	Nick Gillam-Smith	12 December 2018	N/A
Throughout episode finds from Norwich Castle Museum are shown Sites and archaeology featured: Bullecourt First World War battlefield (director of the excavation Richard Osgood); Woodbridge Henge (director of the excavation Vinny Monahan); Remains of medieval village near Chichester examined in Portslade-by-Sea (archaeologist Garrett Sheehan, archaeobotanists Stacey Adams and Angela Vitolo, finds specialist Isa Benedetti-Whitton, reporting by Raksha Dave); Great Whelnetham Roman slave cemetery (director of the excavation Kerrie Bull); Mapledurwell Treasure hoard of silver coins deposited in the early years of the English Civil War (finder Darcy Fear, conservator Duygu Camurcuoglu senior conservator Pippa Pearce); Possible Anglo-Saxon double monastery of Bernician princess Æbbe near the later Norman Coldingham Priory (project manager Manda Forster); Possible Anglo-Saxon double monastery of Essexian noblewoman Æthelburh in Barking (director of the excavation Graham Hull); Seal matrix of Balthild (commentary by Tim Pestell)
4	"Iron Age Revealed"	Tom Ranson	Tom Ranson	Nick Gillam-Smith	19 December 2018	N/A
Iron Age special Sites and archaeology featured: Pocklington square burrows and chariot burial (2014 and 2018 dig: director of the excavation Paula Ware); Crannog of Loch Tay (commentary by Michael Stratigos, Derek Hamilton and Gordon Cook); Model of the Iron Age chariot (builder Robert Hulford, archaeologist Peter Halkon); Chemical analysis of skeletons from Iron Age Somerset (specialist Richard Madgwick, reporting by Raksha Dave); Replica of Battersea Shield (commentary by Jackie Keily); Penycloddiau hillfort (director of the excavation Rachel Pope); Bone analysis of skeletons from Iron Age Somerset (commentary by Richard Madwick, reporting by Raksha Dave); Conservation of Cauldrons found near Glenfield (conservation and commentary by Liz Barham, commentary also by John Thomas)

=== Series 8 (2019) ===
No. in season	Title	Directed by	Producer(s)	Series Producer	Original release date	UK viewers (millions)
1	"West"	Sophie Smith	Sophie Smith	Paul Olding	20 November 2019	N/A
Sites and archaeology featured: Cotswolds' 6th century Anglo-Saxon burial ground (finder Chris, director of the excavation Richard Osgood); Shaftesbury Anglo-Saxon Abbey (director of the excavation Julian Richards, reporting Naoise Mac Sweeney); Ffynnon Beuno Cave early modern human tools (director of the excavation Rob Dinnis); Anglo-Saxon minster near Berkeley Castle (co-directors of the excavation Mark Horton and Stuart Prior); Bronze Age burial mound at Barrow Clump, Salisbury Plain (director of the excavation Richard Osgood, post excavation project manager Phil Andrews, reporting Naoise Mac Sweeney, senior osteoarchaeologist Kirsten Egging Dinwiddy); Tudor era human remains in the coastal cliff near Monknash (director of the excavation Jacqui Mulville)
2	"North"	Gareth Sacala	Gareth Sacala	Paul Olding	27 November 2019	N/A
Sites and archaeology featured: Bradgate House of Bradgate Park (director of the excavation Richard Thomas); Downpatrick's Victorian work house cemetery (osteoarchaeologist Bethany Johnson, director of the excavation Chris Lynn, reporting by Naoise Mac Sweeney); Village that stood from medieval time to 19th century near Creswell Crags (director of the excavation Kevin Kuykendall); Anglo-Saxon cemetery near Scremby (director of the excavation Hugh Willmott); Viking hall at Skaill Farmstead, Rousay, Orkney (director of the excavation Daniel Lee); Celtic roundhouse with Roman influence Swaledale (director of the excavation Philip Bastow); Excavation of Abbey of Poulton cemetery (director of the excavation Kevin Cootes, osteoarchaeologist Rea Carlin, reporting by Naoise Mac Sweeney)
3	"South"	Sophie Smith, Gareth Sacala	Sophie Smith, Gareth Sacala	Paul Olding	4 December 2019	N/A
Sites and archaeology featured: Barcombe Roman settlement (director of the excavation Rob Wallace); Underwater mesolithic timber structure near Isle of Wight (director of the dives Garry Momber); Reconstruction of the mesolithic platform (reconstruction by Garry Momber, reporting Naoise Mac Sweeney); Iron Age burial 8 miles from Dorchester (director of the excavation Martin Papworth); Motor Launch ML-286 from First World War on Thames bank at Isleworth Ait (director of the investigation Eliott Wragg); Roman villa near Frampton (director of the excavation Miles Russell); Excavation of Boar's Head Theatre in London (director of the excavation Heather Knight, reporting by Naoise Mac Sweeney); Revisit of 19th century burial ground excavation on Burrow Island (director of the excavation Richard Osgood)
4	"WWII Special"	Sophie Smith, Gareth Sacala	Sophie Smith, Gareth Sacala	Paul Olding	11 December 2019	N/A
World War II special Throughout episode Imperial War Museum Duxford is shown Sites and archaeology featured: Recovery of Fairey Barracuda bomber near Gosport (commentary by Simon Aday-Davies, David Morris and Ben Saunders); Windermere Boys village at Calgarth Estate, Troutbeck Bridge (director of the excavation Kevin Colls); Remains of barracks of Easy Company near Aldbourne (director of the excavation Richard Osgood); Reconstruction and conservation of the Barracuda (project lead David Morris, engineer William Gibbs, reporting by Naoise Mac Sweeney); Excavation of the V-2 rocket near Marden (directors of the excavation Colin and Sean Welch); Remains of D-Day landings rehearsal known as Operation Tiger on Slapton Sands (finder Ken Small, commentary of the Dean Small, surveyor Graham Scott, reporting by Naoise Mac Sweeney); Excavation of the remains of P-38 Lightning of Second Lieutenant Milo Rundall near Castleblayney in County Monaghan (director of the excavation Jonny McNee)

=== Special (2020) ===
(Note: Each episode is about 30 minutes in length.) (Note: Each episode is a compilation of material from previous series.)

No. in season	Title	Directed by	Producer(s)	Series Producer	Original release date	UK viewers (millions)
1	"The Greatest Discoveries: The Early Settlers"	Not listed	Denis Minihan	Not listed	17 March 2020	N/A
Sites and archaeology featured: Almost million years old flint tools near Happisburgh (S01E02); Star Carr mesolithic antler headdress (S04E03); Bulford Henges late Neolithic double henge monument (S05E01); Cladh Hallan project's burials, South Uist (S02E03); Must Farm Bronze Age settlement (S05E03); Salcombe B Middle Bronze Age Shipwreck (S01E02)
2	"The Greatest Discoveries: A Land of Tribes"	Not listed	Denis Minihan	Not listed	24 March 2020	N/A
Sites and archaeology featured: Crannog of Loch Tay (S07E04); Fin Cop fort (S02E03); Pocklington square burrows and chariot burial (S07E04); Chiseldon cauldrons (S02E03); Iron Age settlement of Winterborne Kingston (S04E01); Grouville Hoard of Coriosolite coins from Jersey (S05E01)
3	"The Greatest Discoveries: Roman Conquest"	Not listed	Denis Minihan	Not listed	31 March 2020	N/A
Sites and archaeology featured: Bloomberg Roman wooden London (S06E02); Vindolanda excavation under one of the barracks (S06E03); Roman siege forts at Burnswark Hill (S05E02); Mysterious remains of 97 Roman newborns near Hambleden (S02E01); Frome Roman coins Hoard (S01E01); Great Whelnetham Roman slave cemetery (S07E03)
4	"The Greatest Discoveries: Anglo-Saxon Kingdoms"	Not listed	Denis Minihan	Not listed	7 April 2020	N/A
Sites and archaeology featured: Barrow Clump Anglo-Saxon cemetery (S07E02); Lyminge Anglo-Saxon royal hall (S03E01); Staffordshire Hoard conservation (S04E01); Anglo-Saxon minster near Berkeley Castle (S08E01); Watlington Hoard (S05E03); Possible victims of St Brice's Day massacre (S02E02)

=== Series 9 (2022) ===
No. in season	Title	Directed by	Producer(s)	Series Producer	Original release date	UK viewers (millions)
1	"East"	Not listed	Edward Hart, (Note: Credited as Executive Producer.) Rory Wheeler	Theo Williams	4 January 2022	N/A
Sites and archaeology featured: Rutland Roman villa with an Iliad Mosaic on the Triclinium floor discovered in a crop field near Stamford (finder Jim Irvine, director of the excavation John Thomas, painter of the mosaic David Neal); 7th century Anglo-Saxon burial site in Deal, only 350m northeast of the Mill Hill Anglo-Saxon cemetery (director of the excavation Tim Allan, conservator Dana Goodburn-Brown); Guthlac's Hermitage near Crowland (director of the excavation Hugh Willmott); Vitae Sancti Guthlaci (historian Philippa Hosking, reporting Onyeka Nubia); Rutland roman grave (in charge of the dig team Jennifer Browning); Rutland roman building (in charge of the dig Jeremy Taylor); Malt house in Anglo-Saxon settlement near Sedgeford (director of the excavation Ellie Blakelock, person responsible for identification of seeds Hannah Caroe); Ale brewing reconstruction (brewing historian John ?, reporting Stuart Prior); Further excavation of the Rutland mosaic
2	"South"	Not listed	Edward Hart, Rory Wheeler	Theo Williams	5 January 2022	N/A
Sites and archaeology featured: Stoke Mandeville's remnants of St Mary the Virgin church (director of the excavation Rachel Wood, later in tent also Guy Hunt); Salisbury Plain Bronze Age post holes (director of the excavation Richard Osgood); Reconstruction of roundhouse at Butser Ancient Farm (building expert Trevor Creighton, reporting Stuart Prior); Roman bathhouse near the Silchester Roman Town (director of the excavation Mike Fulford); London's Iron Age settlement in Barn Elms (director of the excavation Mike Curnow, later in tent also iron age finds specialist Adam Sutton); Mesolithic DNA sample from the Solent (gatherer Garry Momber); DNA analysis of the Solent sample (expert Robin Allaby, reporting Cat Jarman); Roman busts and urns from Church of Saint Mary of Stoke Mandeville dig (commentary by Rachel Wood and Guy Hunt)
3	"North"	Not listed	Edward Hart, Rory Wheeler	Theo Williams	6 January 2022	N/A
Sites and archaeology featured: Richmond Castle medieval layer (director of the excavation Jim Brightman); Richmond Castle victorian cell block (commentary by Kevin Booth); Neolithic Tresness Chambered Tomb on Sanday (director of the excavation Vicky Cummings, additional information Hugo Anderson-Whymark); Prestonpans cart wagon railway (director of the excavation Ed Bethune, additional information Anthony Dawson); Roman vicus associated with the Navio Roman Fort in the lead producing Hope Valley (director of the excavation Tom Parker); Roman lead water pipe reconstruction (lead specialist Peter Rumley, reporting Stuart Prior); Bath's roman baths (baths manager Stephen Clews, reporting Stuart Prior); Industrial Revolution Trinity Burial Ground in Hull (director of the excavation Steve Rowland); Analysis of the skeleton from cemetery of Hull (osteoarchaeologist Lauren McIntyre); Grave goods from Hull Cemetery (senior finds officer Lisa Wastling)
4	"Midlands"	Not listed	Edward Hart, Rory Wheeler	Theo Williams	11 January 2022	N/A
Sites and archaeology featured: Suspected Knights Hospitaller Manor farm in Castle Hill Country Park near Leicester (director of the excavation Matthew Morris); UK's largest Ichthyosaur discovered in Rutland Water (director of the excavation Dean Lomax); 70 burials of Anglo-Saxons in Croft Gardens, Cambridge (director of the excavation Ernie Rizzo); Analysis of Croft Gardens finds (Anglo-Saxon textile expert Sue Harrington, reporting by Onyeka Nubia); Roman period findings from 2017 excavation in Leicester (commentary by Gavin Speed and Nick Cooper); Excavation of the ichthyosaur (director of the excvation Dean Lomax); Iron Age and Roman period settlements in Blackgrounds (Nick Finch, commentary Matt Smith, later in the tent finds specialist Owen Humphreys)
5	"West"	Not listed	Edward Hart, Rory Wheeler	Theo Williams	12 January 2022	N/A
Sites and archaeology featured: Roman settlement near Mendip Hills (Archaeology Clerk of Works Mike Glyde, director of the excavation of the Oxford Archaeology team Bob McIntosh, county archaeologist Cat Lodge); Dating of Cerne Abbas Giant (commentary by Mike Allen and Martin Papworth, luminescence expert Phillip Toms); Child burials near Whitesands Bay (director of the excavation Ken Murphy); Whitesands Bay children skeletons analysis (analysis by Kate ?, reporting by Cat Jarman); 7th century burials at Salisbury Plain (director of the excavation Richard Osgood, osteoarchaeologist Jackie McKinley); Excavation of remnants of Bristol Beaufort AW271 near Ballykelly (director of the excavation Johnny McNee)
6	"North"	Not listed	Edward Hart, Rory Wheeler	Theo Williams	13 January 2022	N/A
Sites and archaeology featured: Settlement outside of Birdoswald Roman Fort near Gilsland (co-directors of the excavation Ian Haynes and Tony Willmott); Roman wooden figure from excavation along HS2 route in Buckinghamshire (commentary by Diana Fernandez and Ian Panter); Pictish settlement near Burghead (director of the excavation Gordon Noble); Finds from the time of Industrial Revolution under the car park Packer Street, Rochdale (director of the excavation Graham Mottershead, additional informations archaeologist Ashley Brogan); Famine road near Enniskillen (co-directors of the excavation Eileen and Colm Murphy, additional information Catherine Scott); History of Parliament response to the Great Famine of Ireland (reporting Onyeka Nubia); Bronze Age log coffin from Tetney Golf Club near Grimsby (commentary by Ian Panter and Hugh Willmott); Medieval burial ground under planned tram line in Leith (director of the excavation John Lawson)

=== Series 10 (2023) ===
No. in season	Title	Directed by	Producer(s)	Series Producer	Original release date	UK viewers (millions)
1	"Roman Towns and Tudor Shipwrecks"	Not listed	Denis Minihan	Theo Williams	1 January 2023	N/A
Sites and archaeology featured: Roman settlement on Stane Street in Bishop's Stortford (director of the excavation Greer Dewdney, later in the tent Andy Greef); Anglo-Saxon monastic settlement of Cynethryth in Cookham (director of the excavation Gabor Thomas); Recovery of the timber from a ship probably from Tudor period near Dungeness (director of the excavation Andrea Hamel, additional informations Ben Saunders); Dendrochronology analysis of timber from Dungeness (dendrochrologist Robert Howard, reporting Cat Jarman); Photogrametry of the ship timber from Dungeness (Andrea Hamel Antony Firth); Buildings of the mint in the Tower of London (curator Alfred Hawkins); Reconstruction of impure Henry VIII coinage (historic coin making expert Dave Grinnell, reporting Stuart Prior); Winterbourne Kingston Iron Age graves (director of the excavation Miles Russell, osteoachaeologist Megan Russell)
2	"Arthur's Stone and a Georgian Mine"	Not listed	Denis Minihan	Theo Williams	8 January 2023	N/A
Sites and archaeology featured: Vicinity of the Neolithic dolmen called Arthur's Stone near Dorstone (director of the excavation Julian Thomas, aerial surveying Adam Stanford); Cobalt mine near Alderley Edge (leader of the team of explorers Ed Coghlan); 17th century European ceramics from Plymouth(director of the excavation Martin Reed); Probably Friary of Saint Saviour in Haverfordwest (director of the excavation Fran Murphy); Neolithic settlement near Derry (director of the excavation Katy McMonagle)
3	"Headless Romans and Anglo Saxon Gold"	Not listed	Denis Minihan	Theo Williams	22 January 2023	N/A
Sites and archaeology featured: HS2 excavation of gatehouse remains on the site of Elizabethan Coleshill Manor, Warwickshire (director of the excavation Stuart Pierson, find specialist Lorraine Mepham, Civil War expert Bob Clarke); What happened in Coleshill Manor (expert of the Civil War Andrew Hopper, reporting Onyeka Nubia); Harpole Treasure (lead conservator Liz Barham, additional information Riva Boutylkova); Iron Age Enderby Bark Shield found at Everards Meadows; Bark shield construction techniques (leader of the project Matthew Beamish, later in the tent Sophia Adams); Decapitated Roman deviant burials near St Neots (director of the excavation Stuart Ladd); Moat of Sheffield Castle (director of the excavation Milica Rajic, drilling supervisor Richard Pain); Boreholes from Moat of Sheffield Castle (borehole expert Daniel Young, reporting Cat Jarman); Bronze Age mound in Oxford (director of the excavation Ben Ford, later in the tent osteologist Lauren McIntyre)
4	"Mystery Shipwreck and a Roman Army Camp"	Not listed	Denis Minihan	Theo Williams	29 January 2023	N/A
Sites and archaeology featured: Potential Norman hunting lodge in Lower Hazel, Gloucestershire dating to The Anarchy (owner John ?, director of the excavation Stuart Prior); Nautical Archaeology Society identifies a wreck off the coast of Eastbourne as the Dutch merchant ship Klein Hollandia, sunk in 1672 (team leader Mark Beattie-Edwards); Klein Hollandia engagement with British fleet account (reporting Onyeka Nubia); National Trust excavates the Neolithic Flagstones Enclosure in the grounds of Max Gate, Dorchester (director of the excavation Martin Papworth, additional informations Harriet Still); Maumbury Rings (commentary Harriet Still); Roman marching camp in Roche, Cornwall, UK's westernmost Roman camp found to date (director of the excavation Sean Taylor); Large concentration of Iron Age grain storage pits in Stanton Harcourt, Oxfordshire dating to the 1st century BC (director of the excavation Jamie Williams); Mysterious sinkhole in East Kennett surrounded in the 4th century with sarsen stones by Romans, possibly as a religious feature (director of the excavation Josh Pollard)
5	"Roman Mosaics and Ancient Weapons"	Not listed	Not listed	Not listed	5 February 2023	N/A
Sites and archaeology featured: Rutland Roman villa complex of buildings (director of the excavation John Thomas, commentary by Jennifer Browning, later in the tent painter of the mosaic David Neal); Mesolithic finds on ancient island near Scarborough (co-directors of the excavation Nick Overton, Amy Gray Jones and Barry Taylor); Tudor fortress in Kingston upon Hull (director of the excavation Peter Connelly); Neolithic flint finds in field near Harlaxton (director of the excavation Emily Stamitti); Flint knapping (expert James Dilley, reporting Stuart Prior); Iron Age long brooch examination (iron age expert Mel Giles, brooch expert Sophia Adams, reporting Cat Jarman); Pots from Must Farm Bronze Age settlement (commentary by Matthew Broodnel and Chris Wakefield)
6	"Ice Age Camp and a Saint with Syphilis"	Not listed	Denis Minihan	Theo Williams	12 February 2023	N/A
Sites and archaeology featured: Mesolithic flint finds on Islay (director of the excavation Steve Mithen); Remains of Isabel German from All Saints Fishergate in York (osteologist Lauren McIntyre); Story of the Isabel German (archivist Laura Yeoman, reporting Onyeka Nubia); Neolithic saltern near Street House Farm, Loftus (director of the excavation Steve Sherlock); Experimental neolithic salt production (material scientist Yvette Marks, reporting Stuart Prior); Excavation of Piermaster's Green Liverpool (director of the excavation Vanessa Oakden); Medieval palace complex of Auckland Castle (co-directors of the excavation John Castling and Chris Gerrard); Iron Age hillforts in Holyrood Park (director of the excavation Jon Henderson)

=== Series 11 (2024) ===
No. in season	Title	Directed by	Producer(s)	Series Producer	Original release date	UK viewers (millions)
1	"The Roman Emperor’s Bathhouse"	Dominic Ozanne	TBA	Dominic Ozanne	2 January 2024	N/A
Northern Britain Sites and archaeology featured: Largest known building on Hadrian's Wall, the Petriana bathhouse of emperor Septimius Severus in Carlisle (director of the excavation Frank Giecco); Pictish fortress on the summit of Mither Tap in Bennachie Hills (director of the excavation Gordon Noble); Medieval pilgrim offerings to Saint Cuthbert thrown into the River Wear from the Elvet Bridge in Durham (finder Gary Bankhead); 12th century account about the shrine of Saint Cuthbert (expert Richard Gameson, reporting Onyeka Nubia); Narrowing down speculations about who built roman bath house in Carlisle, Emperor Septimius Severus (commentary by Frank Giecco); Abandoned Anglo-Saxon village near East Heslerton linked by tephra deposits to the eruption of Icelandic volcano Askja during the Late Antique Little Ice Age (director of the excavation Dominic Powlesland, project lead Nicky Milner); Analysis of sediment samples from East Hestlerton in search of tephra (expert Simon Blockley, reporting Cat Jarman); Norman bailey earthworks in the woods of Lowther Castle dating to the Norman conquest of Cumbria (director of the excavation Jim Morris, historian Sophie Ambler)
2	"Anglo-Saxon Gold and Rebellious Nuns"	Not listed	TBA	Dominic Ozanne	3 January 2024	N/A
Central England Sites and archaeology featured: Late Roman rural site at RAF Alconbury airbase with a large number of pottery and household objects, that were deliberately buried as suspected votive offerings during a time of crisis (director of the excavation Chris Thatcher, project officer Paddy Lambert); 7th-century Anglo-Saxon grave site near New Alresford potentially marking a transition from paganism to Christianity, with the dead laid facing West as in the Christian custom, but still having limited number of grave goods, like knives or a rare gold pendant (director of the excavation Paul McCulloch, find specialist Marit Gamlster); Excavation of the ruined 12th-century Ankerwycke Priory of Benedictine nuns, showing that the surface walls are not a later folly, but remains of a refectory (director of the excavation James Brown, assistant archaeologist Harry Farmer); Ankerwycke nunnery visitation account (librarian Nicholas Bennett, reporting Onyeka Nubia); Restoration of the Old Black Lion pub in Northampton, first documented as a coaching inn early in the 18th century, has uncovered remains of bread ovens from a suspected earlier bakery on the site (director of the excavation Derek Roberts); Dig outside Leicester Cathedral uncovers a Roman sunken room with painted wall plaster fragments and a portable altar, possibly a late 3rd-century private shrine (director of the excavation Matthew Morris)
3	"A Norman Panic Room and a Mesolithic Fish Trap"	Not listed	TBA	Dominic Ozanne	4 January 2024	N/A
Western Britain Sites and archaeology featured: Excavations inside the Decorated Gothic ruins of Tintern Abbey, prior to their conservation, uncover post-dissolution burials of two children in an unusual high-status area outside the abbey east wall, and a shallow grave next to the southern entrance holding a crouched woman with a congenital facial deformation, testifying to the continued use of the site even after it was deconsecrated and stripped for materials (director of the excavation Richard Lewis, osteologists Ciara O'Brien Butler and Richard Madgwick); Mesolithic footprints and 7,000-year-old stakes from a V-shaped fish trap are recorded on the Severn Estuary intertidal mudflats near Goldcliff, after they are uncovered by storms and before being lost to continued erosion (leader of the expedition Martin Bell); Digs near the Norman Fonmon Castle reveal a rare early medieval cemetery settlement dating to the 6th-7th century. The cemetery is enclosed by a ditched bank and shows signs of secular activity, like blacksmith slag or pottery shreds and charred animal bones from feasting, all taking place among the burials, a practice similar to sites of the same period in Ireland (director of the excavation Andy Seaman); Community dig in Siston finds stone foundations of an early medieval site with good metal preservation of stirrups, arrowheads and buckles due to the alkaline soil. The site was originally surrounded by a circular bank and so could have started as a monastic settlement, but later transitioned to a farmstead (directors of the excavation Zillah and David Savage, call-in expert Stuart Prior); Recreation of medieval arrowhead (smith Hector Cole, reporting Stuart Prior); An Iron Age banjo enclosure dating back 2,200 years, uncovered during work on the A417 road 5 miles south of Cheltenham, yields one central crouched burial, animal bones and pottery shards pointing to feasting, but no signs of occupation (director of the excavation Jim Keyte, later in the tent osteoarchaeologist Sharon Clough)
4	"A Roman Mystery and Waterloo’s Disappearing Dead"	Not listed	TBA	Dominic Ozanne	9 January 2024	N/A
Eastern England Sites and archaeology featured: The Ermine Street Roman road in Bracebridge Heath on the outskirts of Lincoln (project officer Kelly Sinclair); Early medieval burials in the Lincolnshire Wolds, Lincolnshire (osteoarchaeologist Jacqueline McKinley, osteologist Ceri Boston); Warham Camp Iron Age hillfort (director of the excavation Andrew Hutcheson, additional informations Matthew Brudenell); Roman dodecahedron and pottery from Norton Disney (director of the excavation Richard Parker, later in the tent Lorena Hitchens); Ruins of the Tudor Elsyng Palace in the grounds of Forty Hall manor house in Enfield, North London (archaeologist John Pinchbeck, director of the excavation Martin Dearne); Building records of Elsyng Palace (reporting Onyeka Nubia); Search dig for a mass burial site in the grounds of Hougoumont farm near Waterloo, Belgium (project lead Stuart Eve, additional information Tony Pollard)
5	"3000-Year-Old Shoes and Giant Axeheads"	Not listed	TBA	Dominic Ozanne	10 January 2024	N/A
Southern England Sites and archaeology featured: North Kent Marshes madlock leather objects (finder Steve Tomlinson, analysis Dana Goodburn-Brown); Leather shoe reconstruction (leather worker Jess Connolly); Paleolithic hand axes Maritime Academy Med Valley Gillingham (director of the excavation Letty Ingrey); Neolithic remnant of an oval barrow and a stone circle near Tenants Hill (director of the excavation Anne Teather, additional informations Jim Rylatt); Roman Town ruins near Exeter Cathedral (director of the excavation John Allan, project manager Simon Hughes); Medieval shipyard in Small Hythe (director of the excvation Nathalie Cohen, additional informations Elliot Wragg); World War II artillery gun emplacements and installations around Fan Bay Deep Shelter, Dover (commentary by Jon Barker)
6	"Forgotten Fortresses and Lost Villages"	Not listed	TBA	Dominic Ozanne	11 January 2024	N/A
Western Britain Sites and archaeology featured: Medieval Snodhill Castle (director of the excavation Tim Hoverd); Early Medieval mosaic in Chedworth Roman Villa (commentary by Martin Papworth); Chedworth sample analysis using Optically Stimulated Luminescence (expert Phillip Toms, reporting Cat Jarman); Stone roundhouse inside Castell Penpleidiau, an Iron Age promontory fort in Caerfai Bay near St Davids (director of the excavation Stephanie Duensing Jodie Hannis); "Oldest house" of Cardiff from Bronze Age (director of the excavation Oliver Davis, later in the tent conservator Leonie McKenzie); Modern remains and medieval roots of the Imber deserted village (director of the excavation Richard Osgood)

=== Series 12 (2025) ===
No. in season	Title	Directed by	Producer(s)	Series Producer	Original release date	UK viewers (millions)
1	"Saxon Gold and Buried Coins"	Unknown	Terry Black & Louise Ord	Dominic Ozanne	7 January 2025	N/A
East of Britain Sites and archaeology featured: Anglo-Saxon burial ground south of the Canterbury (director of the excavation Duncan Sayer, site supervisor Jemma Sweeney, conservator Dana Goodburn-Brown, archaeologist Andrew Richardson); Discovery of the Sizewell C Coin Hoard in Leiston, a lead package with 321 silver coins from the 11th century, believed to have been buried fearing regime change after the coronation of Edward the Confessor in 1042. The site was excavated before the construction of the Sizewell C nuclear power station (leader of post excavation analysis Jo Caruth, conservator Pieta Greaves, coin expert Alexander Bliss); Excavation of boundary ditches around the Roman villa at Norton, Suffolk uncovered a military horse burial dating to the 1st century, potentially linking the foundation of the villa to forts in nearby Ixworth, set up at the same time in the Iceni territory as a response to the Boudican revolt (director of the excavation Kevin MacDonald, archaeologist Murray Andrews); Conservation of the Anglo-Saxon sword and post conservation objects from Canterbury (conservator Dana Goodburn-Brown, commentary by Duncan Sayer); Roman period cemetery with sarcophagus from the vicinity of Peterborough (conservator Morgan Creed, osteologist Don Walker, later in the tent senior finds officer Sara Machin); Wreck of the 17th-century ship of the line London near Southend-on-sea (lead diver Steve Ellis, also later in the tent Vittorio Ricchetti)
2	"Dinosaur Highway and Roman Sauna"	Unknown	Terry Black & Louise Ord	Dominic Ozanne	8 January 2025	N/A
Central Sites and archaeology featured: Middle Jurassic Ardley Dinosaur Trackways found in the Ardley/Dewars Farm Quarry near Bicester (finder Gary Johnson, lead palentologist Richard Butler, palentologist Kirsty Edgar); Warkton Roman Villa in the field near Kettering (co-director of the excavation David Errickson and Chris Chinnock); Iron Age settlements on A428 near St. Neots (project managers Simon Markus and Paige Savage); Tobacco use research on the bodies from early modern period found near Leister Cathedral (project lead Sarah Inskip); Roman period archeology on the Chester House estate in Irchester (site supervisor Jeremy Taylor, archaeological curator Ben Donnelly-Symes, osteoarchaeologist Dale Ohman)
3	"Island Treasures"	Unknown	TBA	Dominic Ozanne	9 January 2025	N/A
Islands Sites and archaeology featured: Neolithic tomb on the Orkney Islands (co-directors of the excavation Vicki Cummings and Hugo Anderson-Whymark); WWI shipwreck of USS Jacob Jones, first US destroyer sunk by enemy action (lead diver Dom Robinson); History of sinking of the Jacob Jones (reporting Yasmin Khan); Lifting, conservation and return to the USA of the bell from Jacob Jones (commentary by Harriet Rushton, conservator Thomas Wicks); Neanderthals tools at vicinity of the Seymour tower 2 miles from the coast of the Island of Jersey (lead archaeologist Matt Pope, later in the tent Olga Finch); Excavation at Kame of Isbister on the Shetland Island (co-directors of the excavation Charlotta Hillerdal and Gordon Noble); Excavation at The Cairns, an Iron Age Atlantic roundhouse or broch on the island of South Ronaldsay (director of the excavation Martin Carruthers)
4	"Roman Crime and Ancient DNA"	Unknown	Terry Black & Louise Ord	Dominic Ozanne	14 January 2025	N/A
North Sites and archaeology featured: Foundations of Arthur Haselrig's mansion in Bishop Auckland (curator of the archaeology John Castling, dig leader Chris Gerrard); Community dig in Millom started because of 6 axe-heads from Bronze Age (finders of the axe-heads Josh and Stephen Carr, director of the excavation Dan Elsworth, axe-head expert Dot Boughton); Roman coin moulds, dated to 260 AD and used to counterfeit money, were found in Ackton Meadows, which would have been on the outskirts of the Roman fort Lagentium, modern-day Castleford (finder Tim ?, director of the excavation David Williams, coin expert Murray Andrews); Replication of the fakery of roman coins (expert Dana Goodburn-Brown, reporting Stuart Prior); The lifting and conservation of the Pictish Old Kilmadock Stone, dated to between the 6th and 8th century, and first excavated and reburied in Old Kilmadock Cemetery in 2022 (director of the excavation Murray Cook, archaeologist Kelly Kilpatrick, lead conservator Graciela Ainsworth); Ancient DNA from medieval cemetery at Poulten (director of the excavation Kevin Coots, geneticists Tom Booth and Pontus Skoglund, in the lab of the Francis Crick Institute geneticist Frankie Tate)
5	"Chariots and Slaves"	Unknown	Terry Black & Louise Ord	Dominic Ozanne	5 January 2025	N/A
West Sites and archaeology featured: Roman villa and possibly temple at Grove (site director Francesca Giarelli, project manager Louis Stafford); Bridle parts found in RAF Valley in Wales (director of the excavation Richard Osgood, later in the tent Adam Gwilt and Adelle Bricking); Hunt for the remains of Bangor Illtyd or "Illtyd's college", the oldest college in the United Kingdom and first hub of Celtic Christianity, founded by Saint Illtud in the early 6th century near the town of Llantwit Major (director of the excavation Tim Young, osteoarchaeologist Beth Price); Findings of global trading from 17th century in Ilfracombe (director of the excavation Sean O'Regan, find manager Naomi Payne); Global trading from 17th century commentary (historian Layla Chambers, reporting Yasmin Khan); Roman period building near Cheltenham at A417 (director of the excavation Alex Thomson, archaeologist Dan ?); Industrial revolution mill in Bristol (director of the excavation Chris Hambleton, project officer Vix Hughes)
6	"Lost Mansions and Impaled Prisoners"	Unknown	TBA	Dominic Ozanne	16 January 2025	N/A
South Sites and archaeology featured: Columbjohn mansion house near the Killerton estate (co-directors of the excavation Cat Lodge and Sue Greaney); Killerton during Civil War (expert Mark Stoyle, reporting Yasmin Khan); Roman period cemetery which included bed burial London (archaeologists Alex Blanks and Michael Marshall); Romani compound in Thorney Hill (director of the excavation John Henry Phillips); Excavations in the Arne RSPB reserve, prior to the expansion of the salt water marshland, uncovered 17,000 fragments of Black-burnished ware pottery, marking a site of Roman mass manufacture of this local pottery (co-directors of the excavation Phil Trim and Greg Chuter); Reconstruction of the Black-burnished ware (master potter Bill Crumbleholme, archaeologist Phil Trim, reporting Stuart Prior); New excavation at Burrow Island also known as Rat Island (director of the excavation Richard Osgood, forensic archaeologist David Erickson)

=== Series 13 (2026) ===
All episodes were released on iPlayer on the premiere date.

No. in season	Title	Editor	Producer-Directors	Series Producer	Original release date	UK viewers (millions)
1	"Scottish Massacre and 70s Skate Park"	Christy Scoltock	Terry Black & Rebecca Hart	Ian Hunt	7 January 2026	N/A
2	"Our Rarest Find and Biggest Dig"	Mark Lovegrove	Terry Black & Rebecca Hart	Ian Hunt	14 January 2026	N/A
3	"A Mysterious Bone Box and Admiral Nelson’s Favourite Ship"	Joe Marcus	Terry Black & Rebecca Hart	Ian Hunt	21 January 2026	N/A
4	"England’s Last Anglo-Saxon King and Scotland's First Whisky"	Mark Lovegrove	Terry Black & Rebecca Hart	Ian Hunt	28 January 2026	N/A
5	"Medieval Murder and Roman Pets"	Nigel Timperley	Terry Black & Rebecca Hart	Ian Hunt	4 February 2026	N/A
6	"A Cornish Legend and an Ancient Wishing Well"	Nigel Timperley	Terry Black & Rebecca Hart	Ian Hunt	5 February 2026	N/A
