= Operation Nightingale (archaeology) =

- Logo, mimicking the Rod of Asclepius

General information
- Vocational
- Field: Archaeological excavation

Description
- Participants: Former military personnel
- Website: www.gov.uk/guidance/operation-nightingale

Operation Nightingale is an initiative in the United Kingdom which trains military veterans in archaeological excavation techniques as therapy for physical injuries, PTSD and other issues, and to develop their skills. It is run by the Ministry of Defence (MoD) in conjunction with Wessex Archaeology, having been established by Richard Osgood, an archaeologist with the MoD's Defence Infrastructure Organisation, in 2011. The first regiment to participate were The Rifles, before the scheme was adopted more widely.

Once trained, participants are deployed to archaeological digs across the UK. The first of these took place in a midden at East Chisenbury. As of 2024, they had been involved in more than 70 such digs. A dig at Barrow Clump, a scheduled monument where permission to dig was granted due to the loss of evidence being caused by digging by badgers, featured in Time Team's 2013 "Warriors" episode, and in the BBC's Digging for Britain, aired in 2015. Another dig was the basis for the 2023 Time Team special episode titled "Digging Band of Brothers", about excavation of the military camp at Aldbourne.

Scheme participants have also worked on the reconstruction of a bronze age house at Butser Ancient Farm, completed in 2021. In March 2026, they assisted in the restoration of the Bulford Kiwi chalk carving.

The scheme has been the subject of several academic papers, and is the subject of a book by Richard Osgood, Broken Pots, Mending Lives: The Archaeology of Operation Nightingale, with a foreword by Alice Roberts.

In 2019, Current Archaeology made Osgood their "Archaeologist of the Year" for his part in Operation Nightingale and other work. He was appointed a Member of the Order of the British Empire (MBE) in the 2021 New Year Honours "for services to defence and to heritage", partly in recognition of his work on the scheme.
