= Bulford Kiwi =

Chalk carving in Wiltshire, England

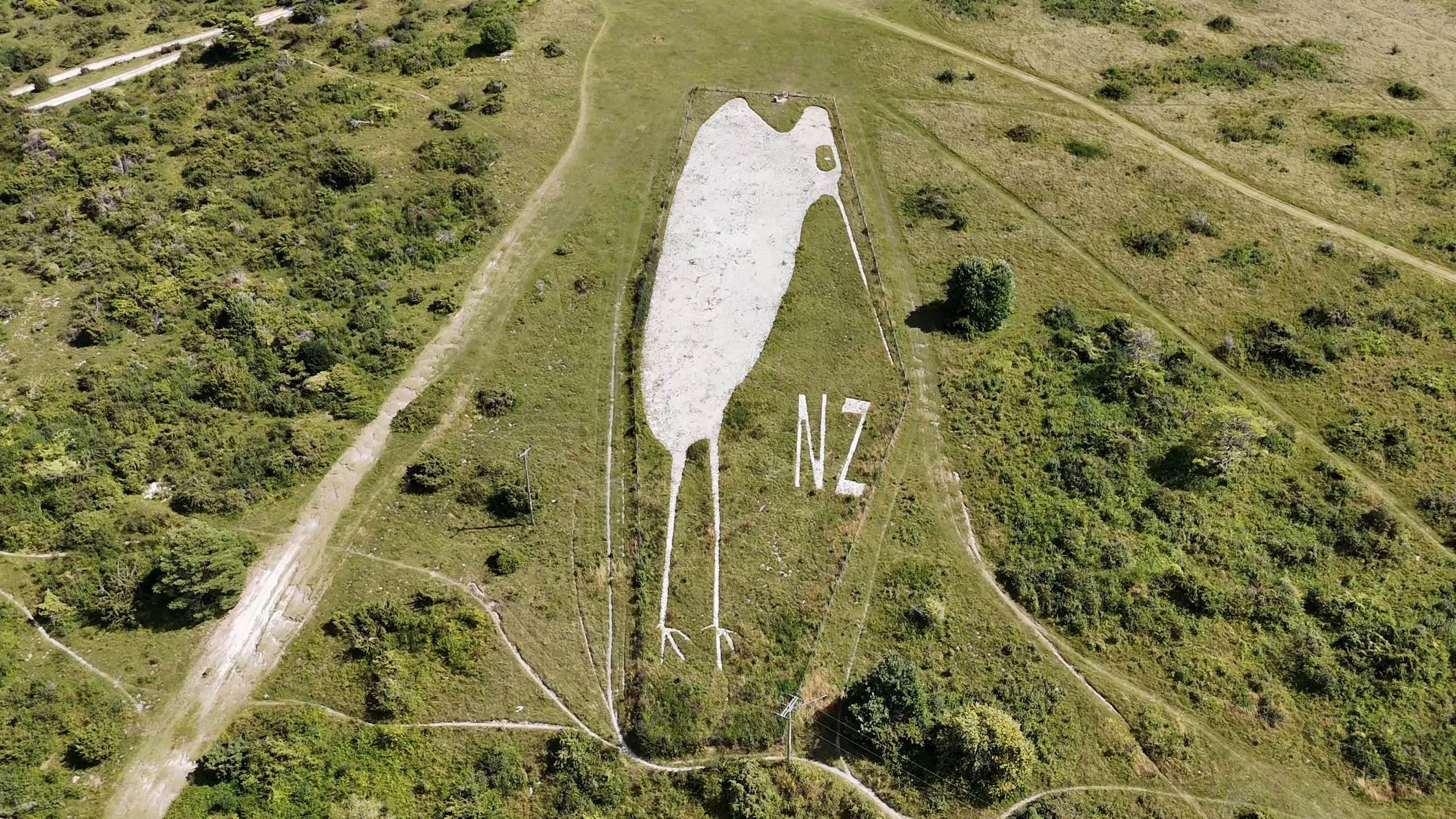
The Kiwi in August 2025

The Bulford Kiwi is a large depiction of a kiwi, carved into the chalk on Beacon Hill above the military town of Bulford on Salisbury Plain in Wiltshire, England. It was created in 1919 by soldiers of the New Zealand Expeditionary Force who were awaiting repatriation following the end of the First World War.

It is one of the few hill figures in Wiltshire that is neither a white horse nor a military badge.

== History ==
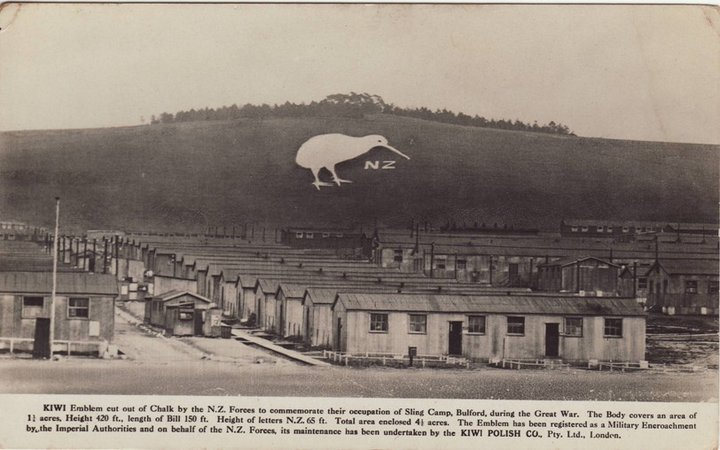
Kiwi from postcard, c. 1919

Sling Camp (now gone), part of Bulford Camp, was established in June 1916 for the New Zealand Expeditionary Force (NZEF). Soldiers of the NZEF underwent training there after arriving in England before being transferred to New Zealand units serving on the Western Front. The Kiwi was constructed on Beacon Hill overlooking the camp.

After the war was over, the New Zealand soldiers were eager to return home, but no troop ships were available. Following riots among frustrated soldiers, their commanding officers decided to keep the troops occupied by carving an enormous kiwi into the chalk hillside. This was carried out in February and March 1919 by the Canterbury and Otago Engineers Battalions. The emblem is cut into the chalk hillside and stands out in contrast to the surrounding vegetation.

The design was executed by Sergeant-Major Percy Cecil Blenkarne, a drawing instructor on the Education Staff, based on a sketch of a stuffed kiwi specimen in the British Museum. The site was surveyed and the design laid out by Sergeant-Major V.T. Low, NZE, also of the Education Staff.

== Size ==
- The Kiwi's body covers 1.5 acres (6,100 m^{2}).
- From the Kiwi's feet to the top of its back is 420 feet (130 m).
- The width is about 460 feet (140 m).
- The beak is 150 feet (46 m) long.
- The letters "N.Z." are 65 feet (20 m) high.

== After the war ==
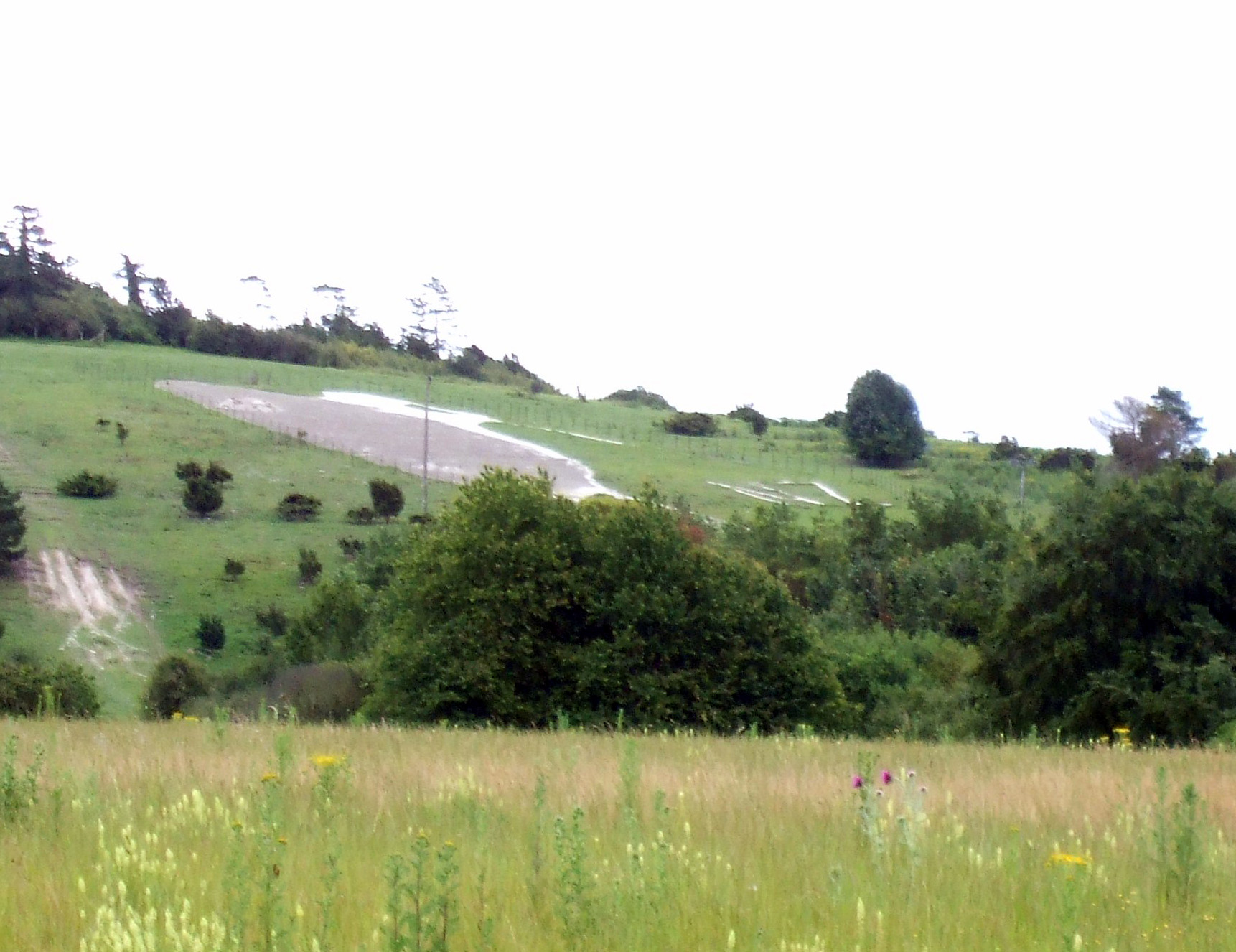
The Kiwi before it was cleaned in 2007

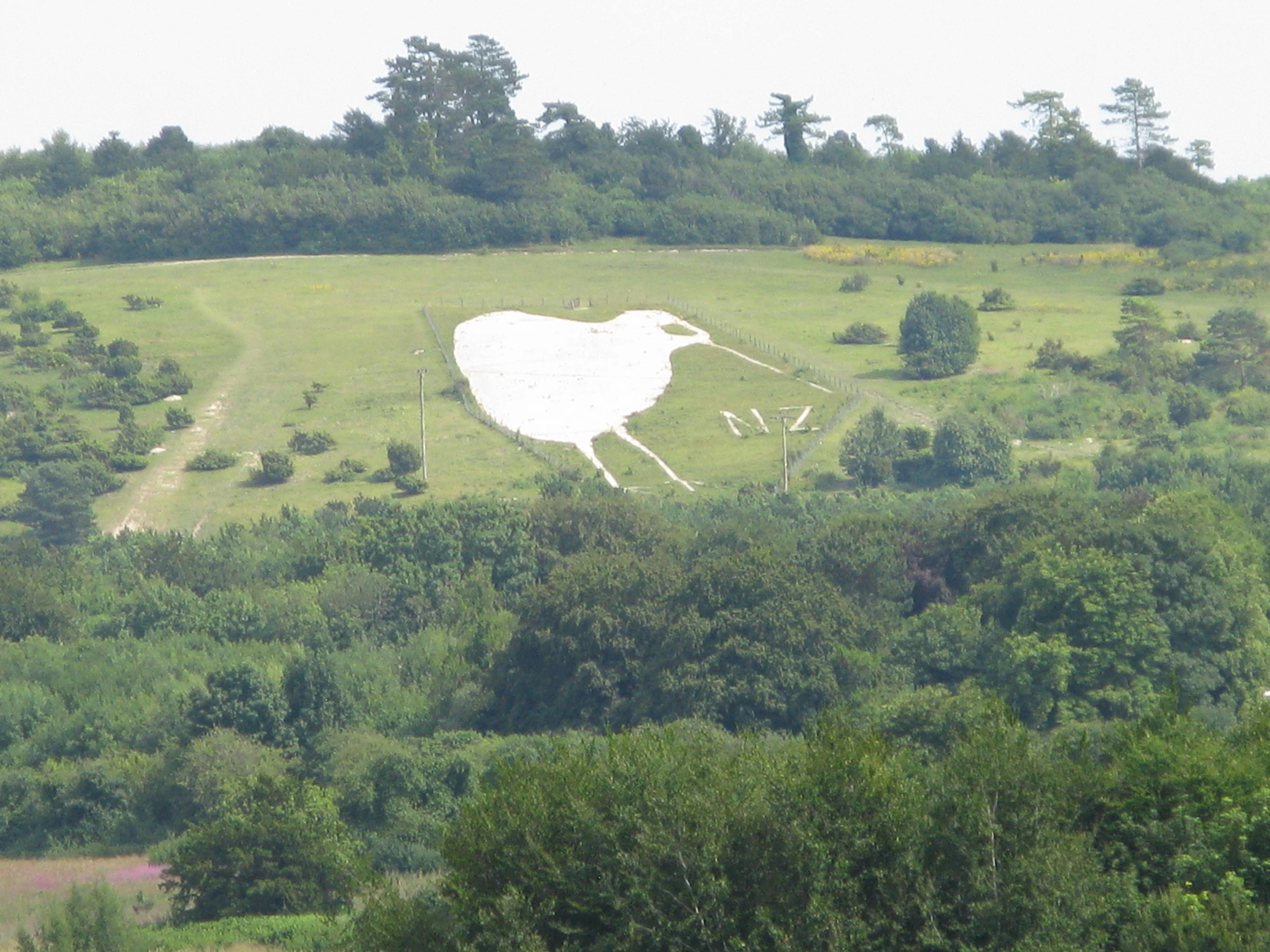
The Bulford Kiwi in August 2013

In the years following the Kiwi's creation, the Kiwi Polish Company maintained the figure through its London offices, employing local villagers to carry out the work. Although the company stated that it had "little if any advertising value", it regarded the figure as a memorial to the New Zealand troops. According to the author John Woolcott, the company treated the Kiwi as "a giant advertising hoarding", similar to the Whipsnade White Lion, but later discovered that "chalk figures are not necessarily the best way of reaching an audience", and reverted to more traditional marketing methods in the 1960s.

During the Second World War, the Kiwi was camouflaged with leaf mould because of concerns that German bombers could use it as a navigation marker during The Blitz. In 1948, the leaf mould was removed by local Boy Scouts, and fresh chalk was added. The Scout troop subsequently renamed itself in honour of the kiwi.

In the early 1950s, Blenkarne arranged for the Kiwi to be maintained by the British Army's 3 (UK) Divisional Headquarters and Signal Regiment, continuing the work previously carried out by 249 Signal Squadron. 3 DHQ&SR formed part of the 3rd Infantry Division.

In 1986, a pillar with a commemorative plaque was unveiled by Bryce Harland, the New Zealand High Commissioner.

Since 2007, the Kiwi has been maintained by the UK Ministry of Defence. In 2017, the chalk figure was designated as a scheduled monument.

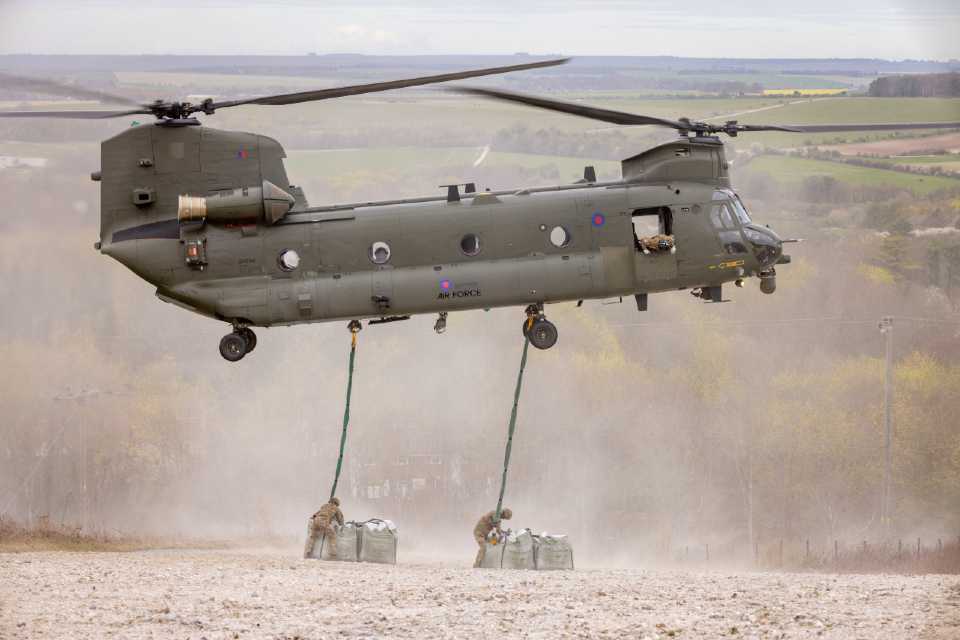
RAF Chinook helicopter delivering chalk in March 2026

On 30 June 2018, the Kiwi was resurfaced. One hundred tons of chalk were ferried to the site by Chinook helicopter, where, under the guidance of Defence Infrastructure Organisation archaeologist Richard Osgood, the chalk was spread over the figure to restore it for the first time in 30 years.

Resurfacing was carried out again in 2023 using 100 tonnes of chalk, with a further 25 tonnes used in 2026, when work was undertaken by a team that included members of Operation Nightingale.

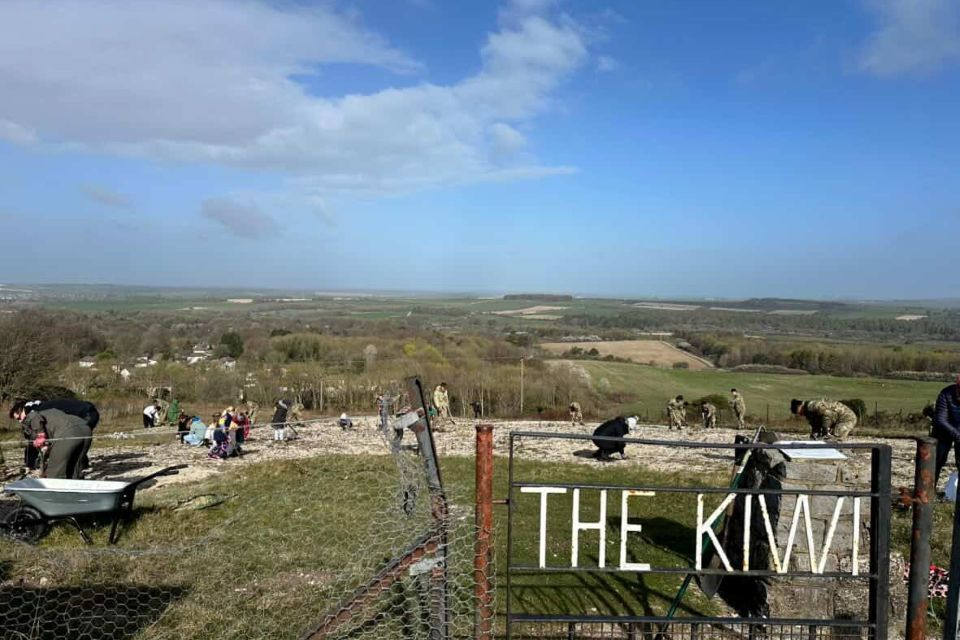
Restoration work underway in 2026, with the gate in the foreground

== Viewing and access ==
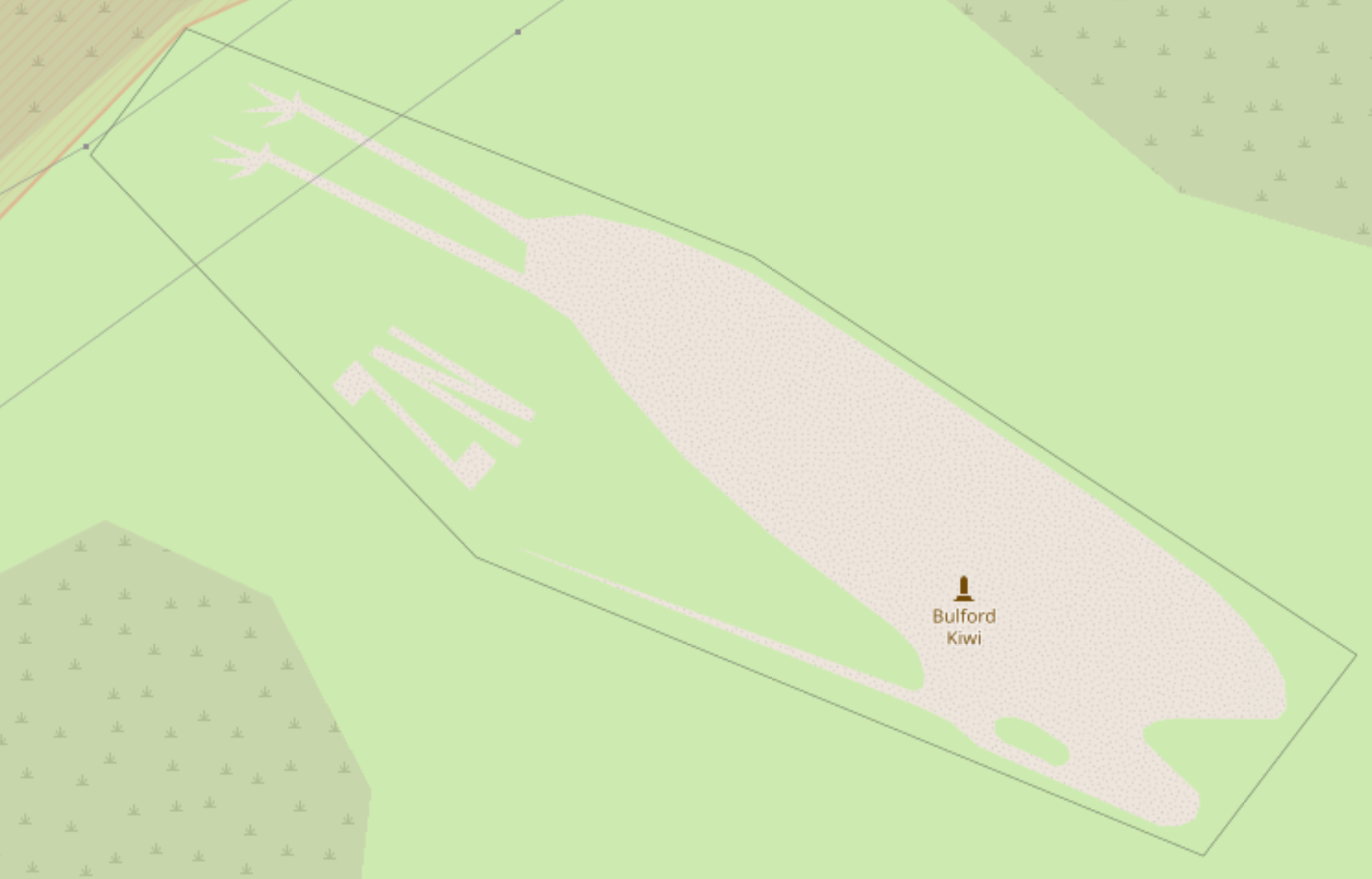
Plan view, as rendered in OpenStreetMap

Views of the Kiwi are largely obscured because the direct view is from within the military camp. The Kiwi can be seen from Tidworth Road, which passes the hillside at an angle, and it is possible to walk up to the figure from there.

North of Tidworth Road at 51.2044°N 1.7345°W is a viewpoint with an information panel. This is signposted from the road via a short stretch of byway.

Distant and distorted views of the Kiwi from the opposite side of the hill can also be seen from Woodhenge and from near Stonehenge.

== See also ==
- List of hill figures in Wiltshire
