= Sling Camp =

WWI camp occupied by New Zealand soldiers

Coordinates: 51°11′38.84″N 1°42′54.20″W

Sling Camp was a World War I camp occupied by New Zealand soldiers beside the then-military town of Bulford on the Salisbury Plain in Wiltshire, England.

== History ==
The camp was initially created as an annexe to Bulford Camp in 1903; it was originally named "Sling Plantation" after the nearby woods. Soon after the beginning of World War I, New Zealand troops started work on building wooden huts here. They were later joined by Canadian troops, joiners, bricklayers, and civilian workers. The word "Plantation" was then dropped from the title and it simply became Sling Camp. After building was completed, it was said that if each hut were placed end-to-end they would measure 6 miles.

In 1916, the camp was occupied by New Zealand forces and was then known as Anzac Camp by some. It then comprised four main sections: Auckland, Wellington, Otago, and Canterbury Lines. It was officially called the 4th New Zealand Infantry Brigade Reserve Camp, and trained reinforcements and casualties who were regaining fitness.

In 1918, there were 4,300 men at Sling. Soon after this date the camp suffered large casualties as a result of the Spanish influenza.

The camp also housed fourteen New Zealand conscientious objectors (among them Archibald Baxter and his brothers Alexander and John), who had been forced into the army and sent all the way from New Zealand to England to make an example of them.

At the end of the war, there were 4,600 New Zealand troops stationed at the camp and it became a repatriation centre. At that time there was unrest in other camps as a result of delays in demobilising troops. To try to maintain order the "spit and polish" regime was enforced and route marches ordered. The men requested a relaxation of discipline as the war was over and they were far from home, however this was refused and the troops rioted, stealing food from the mess and all of the alcohol from the officers' mess.

In an attempt to resolve the situation, the officers and men were promised no repercussions, but this promise was not honoured; the ringleaders were arrested, jailed and immediately shipped back to New Zealand.

To occupy them, the New Zealand soldiers were put to work carving the shape of a large Kiwi in the chalk of the hill that overlooks the camp. The Bulford Kiwi, as it is known, is still there today.

Much of the original camp was demolished in the 1920s and replaced by newer buildings.
