= Meg Russell (archaeologist) =

British archaeologist and television presenter

- Occupations: Archaeologist, television presenter
- Employer: Bournemouth University
- Known for: Digging for Britain; Time Team
- Title: Lecturer in Biological Anthropology

Meg Russell (born Megan Russell) is a British archaeologist and television presenter. She is known for her work in archaeological broadcasting and public engagement, including co-presenting the BBC archaeology series Digging for Britain and appearing on Time Team. She is a lecturer in Biological Anthropology at Bournemouth University.

== Career ==
Russell works as a lecturer in Biological Anthropology at Bournemouth University, where her academic interests include archaeology and public engagement with heritage. Alongside her academic work, she has been involved in initiatives that communicate archaeological methods and discoveries to wider audiences.

== Television work ==
=== Digging for Britain ===
Russell co-presented episodes of the BBC archaeology documentary series Digging for Britain, which reports on archaeological discoveries across the United Kingdom. The programme examines significant archaeological finds and research in Britain.

=== Time Team ===
Russell has appeared on the online revival of Time Team, the long-running British archaeology television programme that originally aired on Channel 4 and has since continued in online formats. She has participated in excavation investigations and contributed to discussions of archaeological findings as part of the programme's team of field archaeologists.

== Digital media and public engagement ==
In addition to television, Russell has co-created archaeology-focused digital media content 'Stratmates' aimed at public audiences. The series was shortlisted for a national Archaeological Achievement Award in the Public Dissemination or Presentation category.

Her outreach work has been highlighted in university news as part of stories on archaeology making headlines in national media.

== Selected appearances ==
- Digging for Britain Season 13 (BBC)
- Time Team
- Stratmates shortlisted for Archaeological Achievement Awards 2025
