= Barrow Clump =

Archaeological site in Wiltshire

Coordinates: 51.221°N 1.764°W

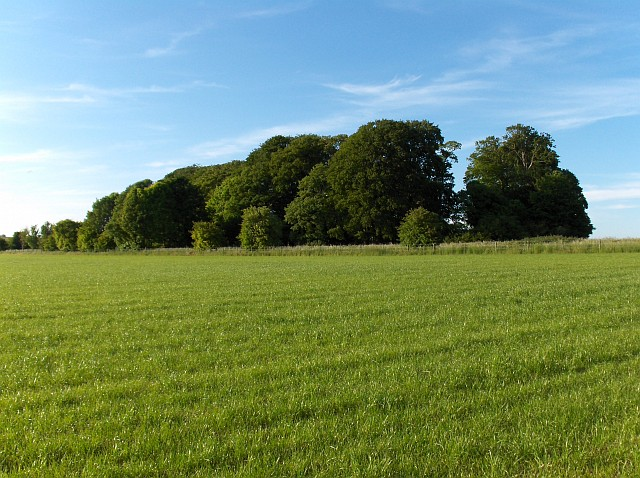
Barrow Clump from the southwest

Barrow Clump is an archaeological site in Figheldean parish, Wiltshire, England, about 3 1/2 miles (5.6 km) north of the town of Amesbury. The site is a scheduled monument.

== Description ==
Barrow Clump lies on the northwestern slope of rising ground about 700 metres east of the village of Ablington, in Figheldean parish.

The surviving part of the monument is a bowl barrow about 30 metres in diameter. Other barrows in the same group have been lost to ploughing. The barrow was constructed in the early Bronze Age on the site of a Neolithic settlement, and much later, around the 6th century, it was re-used as an Anglo-Saxon cemetery.

The site was designated as a scheduled monument in 1990.

== Investigation ==
Partial excavations were carried out in the 19th century, in the early 20th century by Lt Col William Hawley, and in 2003–2004 by English Heritage.

Permission was granted for full excavation in 2012–2014 in order to record the site, which was being extensively damaged by badgers. The project was organised by the Defence Infrastructure Organisation, English Heritage and Wessex Archaeology, and was carried out by soldiers from The Rifles infantry regiment and participants in Operation Nightingale. Many Bronze Age items were found, with a smaller quantity from the Neolithic period. Many Saxon graves were uncovered, together with items including a bucket-shaped drinking vessel, made from pieces of yew wood bound together with bronze. Finds are held by the Wiltshire Museum at Devizes.

== In media ==
Barrow Clump was investigated by the Time Team television series, in episode 5 "Warriors" of series 20, first aired by Channel 4 in 2013.

In 2014 the site was visited by the BBC Four television series Digging for Britain, in episode 2 "West" of series 3, aired in 2015.
