= Burrow Island =

Tidal island in Gosport overlooking Portsmouth

Coordinates: 50°48′12″N 1°07′16″W

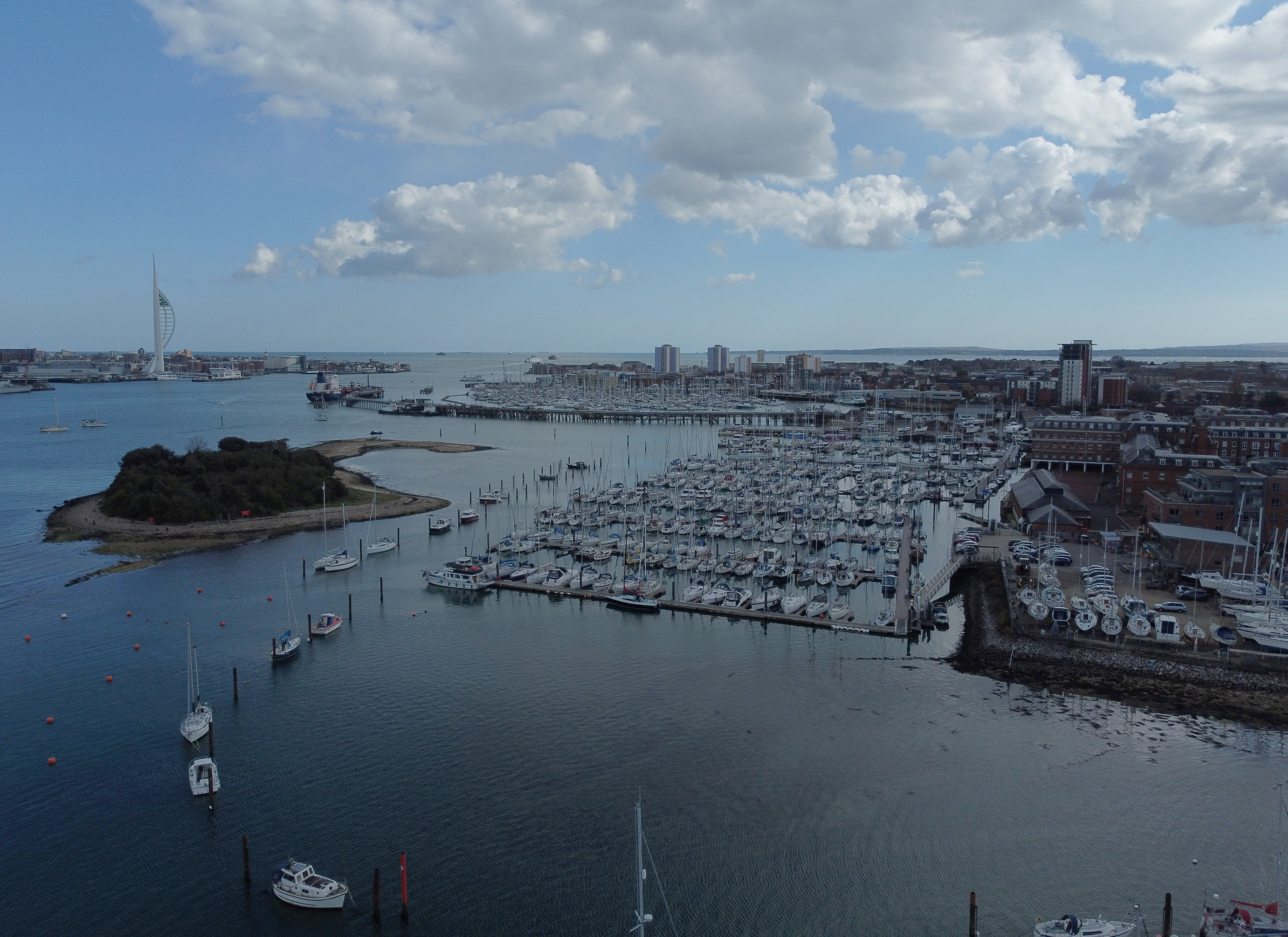
Burrow Island and adjacent marina

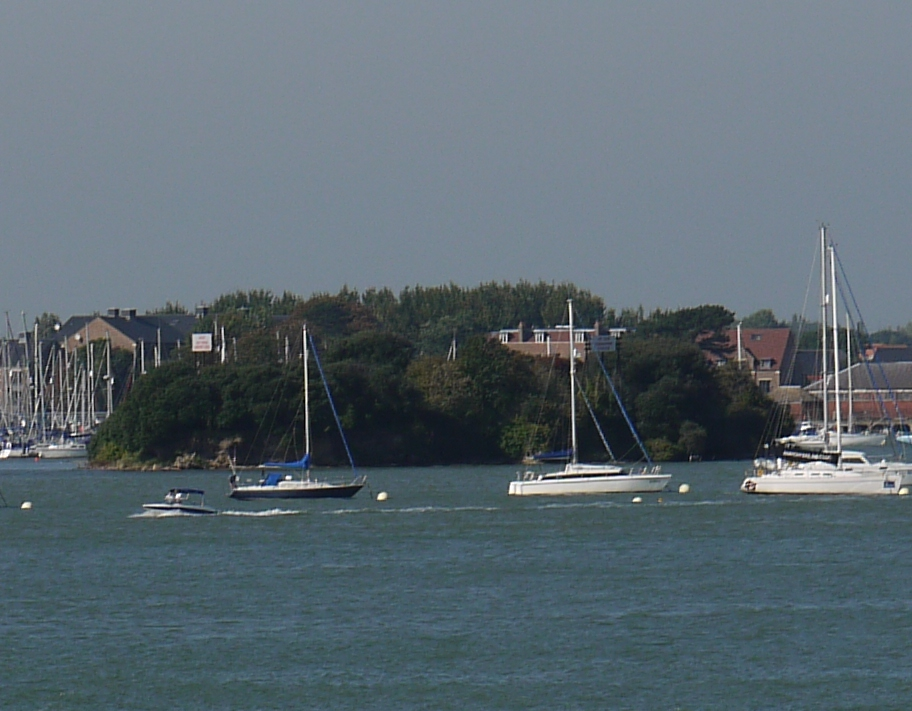
Burrow Island as seen from Portsmouth

Burrow Island (also known as 'Rat Island' or 'Ratty') is a tidal island in Gosport, United Kingdom.

The island overlooks Portsmouth Harbour. At low tide a spit connects it with Priddy's Hard. It has been suggested that the name dates from the 17th century and is derived from being within the borough of Gosport.

It has been claimed that King Stephen (1096–1154), built a fortification on the island, but this is unlikely to have been the case.

Between 1678 and 1679, a fortification named Fort James was constructed on the island under the direction of Bernard de Gomme. It took the form of a square tower 19 ft tall. The fortification was apparently allowed to decay with George Byng commenting on its poor condition in a letter written in either 1707 or 1708. It appears that a rebuilding to a new design was proposed on 1750 but this never took place. What were by then the ruins of the fort were partially demolished in 1827 and nothing now remains above ground level.

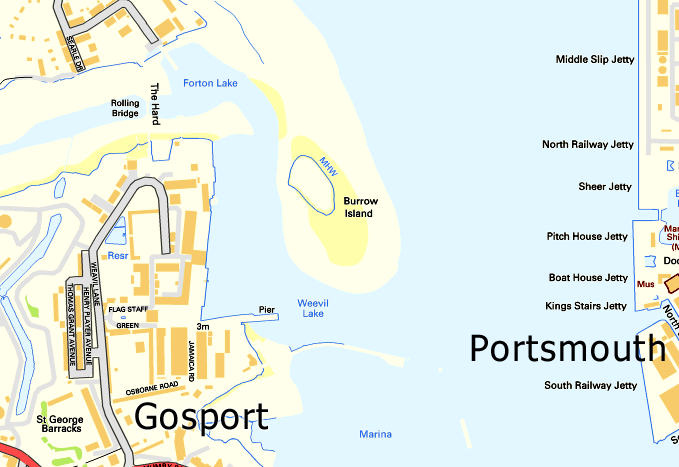
Map of Burrow Island and environs

Burrow Island is owned by the Ministry of Defence, and public access is not permitted; despite this, at low tide some members of the public have ventured onto Burrow Island. It is a popular spot to go fishing. It is known that some have found unique coloured glass bottles that had been washed up on the island. Burrow Island was once used as a burial ground for convicts; several human skeletons were discovered on the island early in 2014. They are believed to be from the 19th century and are the remains of convicts or prisoners of war who had been buried on the island.

Burrow Island is one of 43 (unbridged) tidal islands which can be walked to from the mainland of Great Britain.
