= Sophia Adams =

British archaeologist and curator

Sophia Anne Adams FSA is a British archaeologist and curator. She is the Curator of Europe First Millennium to Roman Conquest collections at the British Museum.

== Biography ==
Adams completed her PhD in 2014 at the University of Leicester with a thesis titled "The first brooches in Britain: from manufacture to deposition in the Early and Middle Iron Age". She was a Research Associate at the University of Bristol from 2014 to 2017. In 2021 she joined the British Museum in her current role.

On 30 January 2025 Adams was elected as a Fellow of the Society of Antiquaries of London.

=== Select publications ===
- Webley, L. and Adams, S. 2016. "Material Genealogies: Bronze Moulds and their Castings in Later Bronze Age Britain", Proceedings of the Prehistoric Society 82, 323–340.
- Webley, L. Adams, S., and Brück, J. 2020. The Social Context of Technology: Non-ferrous Metalworking in Later Prehistoric Britain and Ireland (Prehistoric Society Research Papers). Oxbow.
- Adams, S., Martinón-Torres, M., and Webley, L. 2021. "Diversity in Iron Age metalworking: a unique crucible from Westwood, Coventry", Historical Metallurgy 50(2), 78–84.
- Adams, S., Beamish, M., Cartwright, C., and Wills, B. 2024. "The Enderby Bark Shield: A New Model for the Ancient World". Proceedings of the Prehistoric Society 90, 205–228.
- Adams, S., Craddock, P., Hook, D., La Niece, S., Meeks, N., O'Flynn, D., and Perucchett, L. 2024. "The Pulborough Gold Torc: a 4th to 3rd century BCE artefact of European significance", Internet Archaeology 67 doi:10.11141/ia.67.16
