= Watlington Hoard =

Hoard of silver (and one gold) items and silver coins

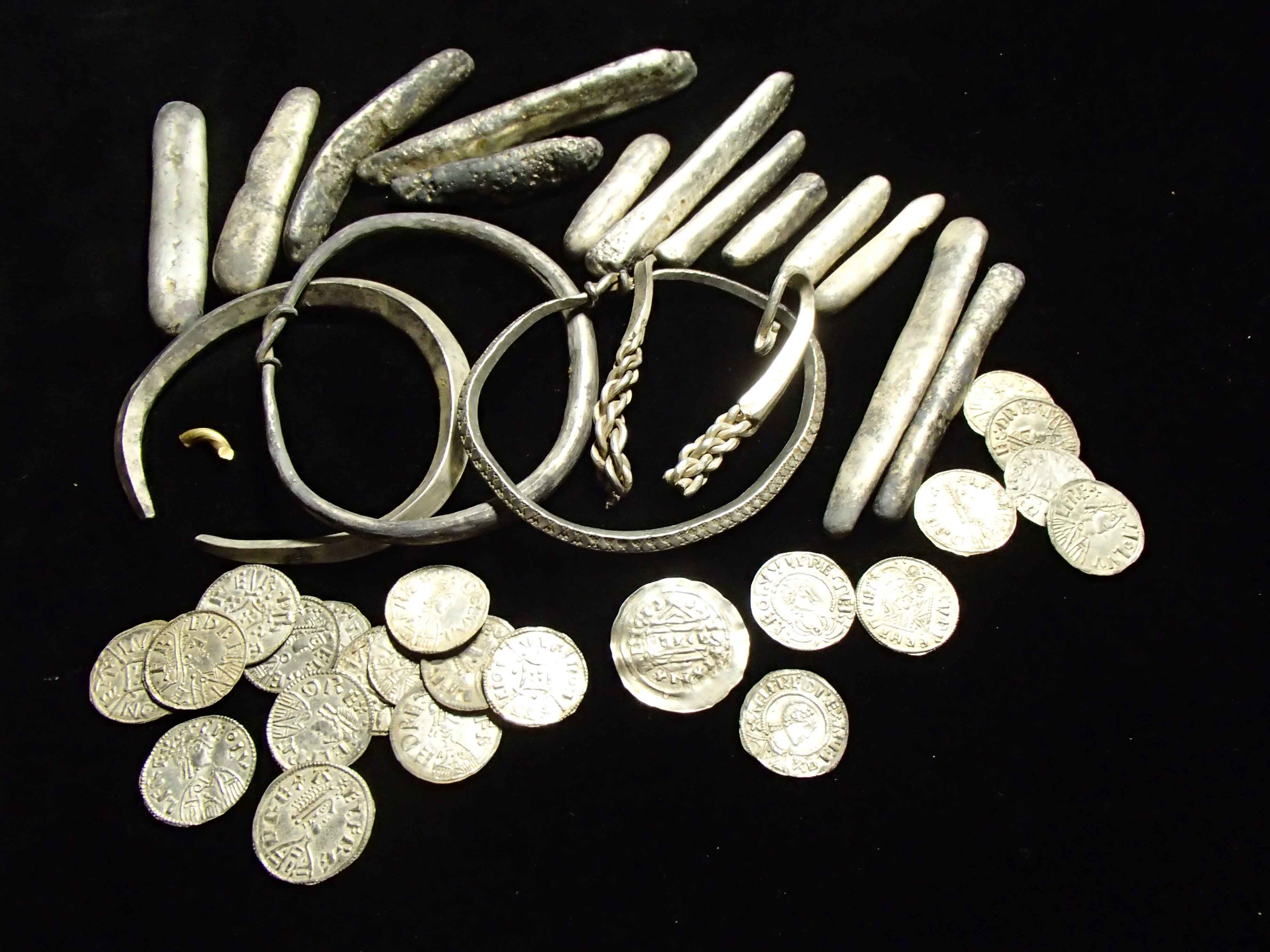
- Material: Silver, Gold
- Created: 9th century
- Period/culture: Viking
- Discovered: Watlington, Oxfordshire, by James Mather, 2015
- Present location: Ashmolean Museum

The Watlington Hoard is a collection of Viking silver, buried in the 870s and rediscovered in Watlington, Oxfordshire, England in 2015.

== Details ==
The hoard is made up of silver – 186 coins (some fragmentary), 15 ingots and 7 pieces of jewellery, including arm-rings – and a scrap of gold. It was buried after Alfred the Great defeated the Great Heathen Army led by Guthrum in 878, forcing the Danes to retreat north. The hoard was rediscovered by James Mather, an amateur metal-detectorist, in 2015 and subsequently excavated.

The period in which the hoard was buried saw extensive warfare between the Danish and Anglo-Saxon kingdoms, and is of considerable interest to historians. The coins, which were minted by Alfred the Great and Ceolwulf II, have "the potential to provide important new information on relations between Mercia and Wessex" in the 9th century, according to Gareth Williams, a curator at the British Museum. Some of the coins show the two kings sitting side by side, in a style known as the "Two Emperors", after Roman coins of the 4th century. These coins would have been intended to make a statement about political cooperation between the two men.

It was announced in February 2017 that the Ashmolean Museum in Oxford had purchased the hoard for £1.35m, to keep it within the county, with funding from the National Lottery, the Art Fund and local donations.
