= Milecastle 37 =

Milecastle on Hadrian's Wall in England

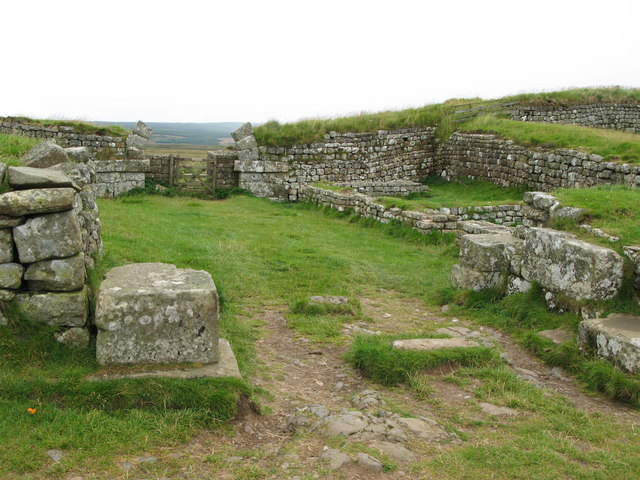
- Remains of Milecastle 37

- Location within Northumberland
- 55.01234°N 2.337652°W
- Type: Milecastle
- Location: Northumberland, England

Milecastle 37 is one of the milecastles on Hadrian's Wall. It is immediately west of the Housesteads Roman Fort (grid reference NY78506869).

== Description ==
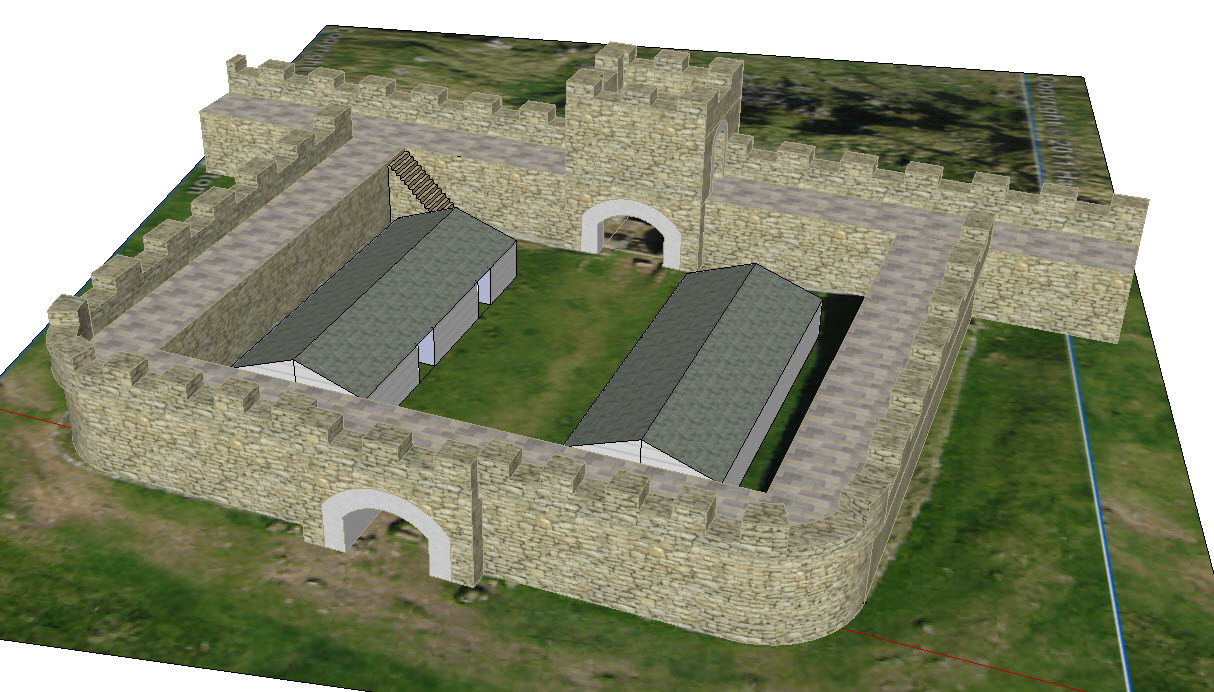
Artistic reconstruction of Milecastle 37

The remains have been partly reconstructed and consolidated; it is now in the care of English Heritage. The wall has a maximum height of 2.2 metres internally. The milecastle has a short axis, with a Type I gateway. The milecastle contains the remains of a small barrack block in the east half which survives to 1.0 metres high.

View from West

== Excavations ==
The first excavations of Milecastle 37 were in 1853, 1907 and 1933. A re-used corner of a Hadrianic dedication slab was found in 1853, and two altars inscribed to Cocidius and Jupiter were found near the milecastle.

Excavations in 1988-9 showed three periods of the north gate, having been built, blocked, then partly demolished.

== Associated turrets ==
Each milecastle on Hadrian's Wall had two associated turret structures. These turrets were positioned approximately one-third and two-thirds of a Roman mile to the west of the Milecastle, and would probably have been manned by part of the milecastle's garrison. The turrets associated with Milecastle 37 are known as Turret 37A and Turret 37B.

=== Turret 37A ===
Turret 37A (Rapishaw Gap) (grid reference NY78056861) was located by exploratory excavation in 1911. The turret appears to have been demolished in the Roman period. The turret is visible only as a slight earthwork on air photographs.

=== Turret 37B ===
Turret 37B (Hotbank Crag) (grid reference NY77586847) was also located by exploratory excavation in 1911. The site is indicated by a stone-studded earthen platform.

== Public access ==
The milecastle, and the sites of both turrets are accessible via the Hadrian's Wall Path.
