= Fin Cop =

Hill in Derbyshire, England

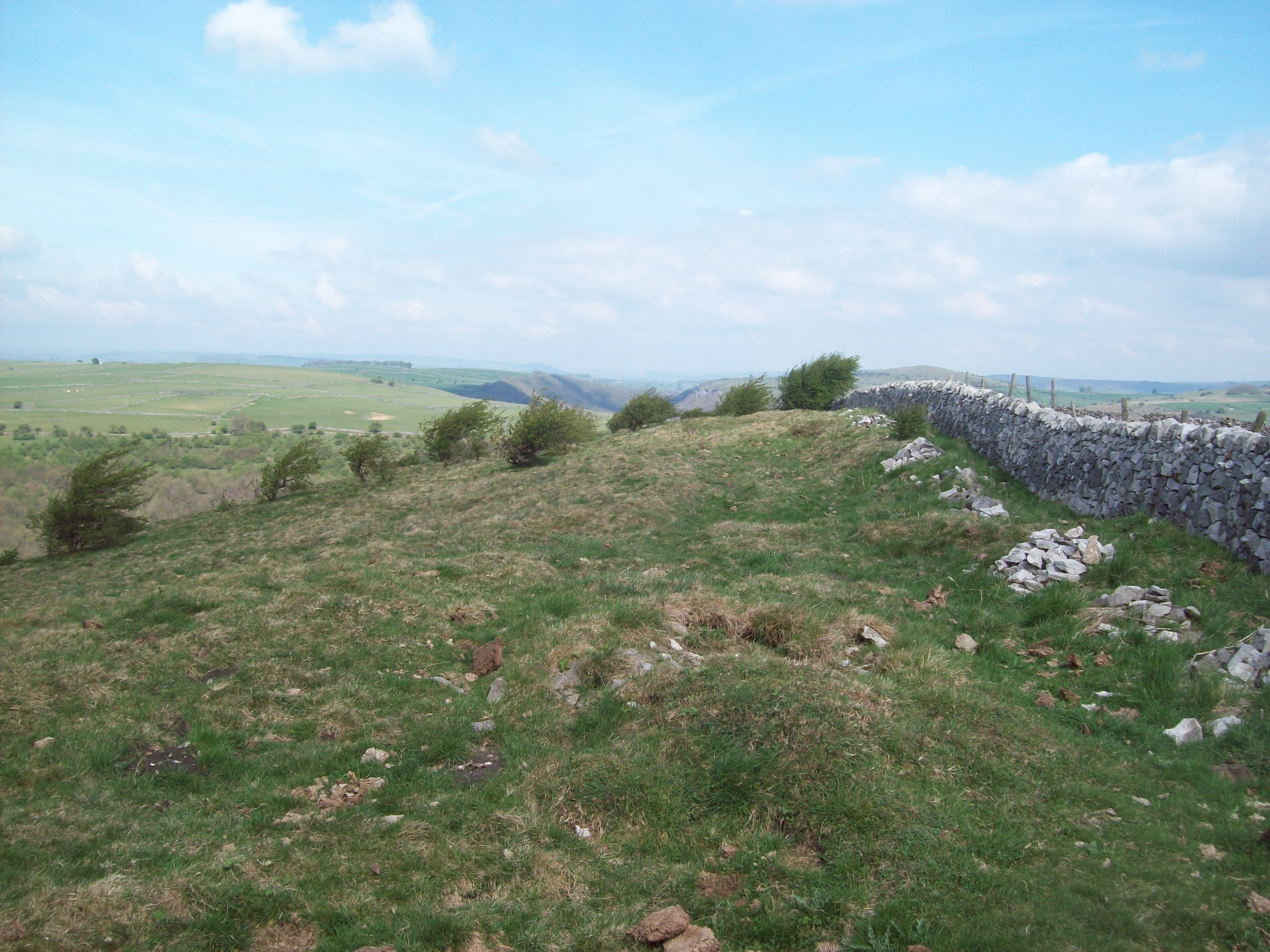
- The summit of Fin Cop

Highest point
- Elevation: 327 m (1,073 ft)
- Coordinates: 53°14′09″N 1°44′13″W

Geography
- Location within England
- Location: Derbyshire, England

Fin Cop is a hill and an associated Iron Age hill fort in Monsal Dale, close to Ashford in the Water in Derbyshire, England.

The fort shows evidence of hurried construction, indicating a defensive response to a real threat, rather than the more usual assumption that such forts were a display of status and prestige. The hillfort, along with an adjacent bowl barrow, lime kiln and quarry, constitutes a Scheduled Ancient Monument.

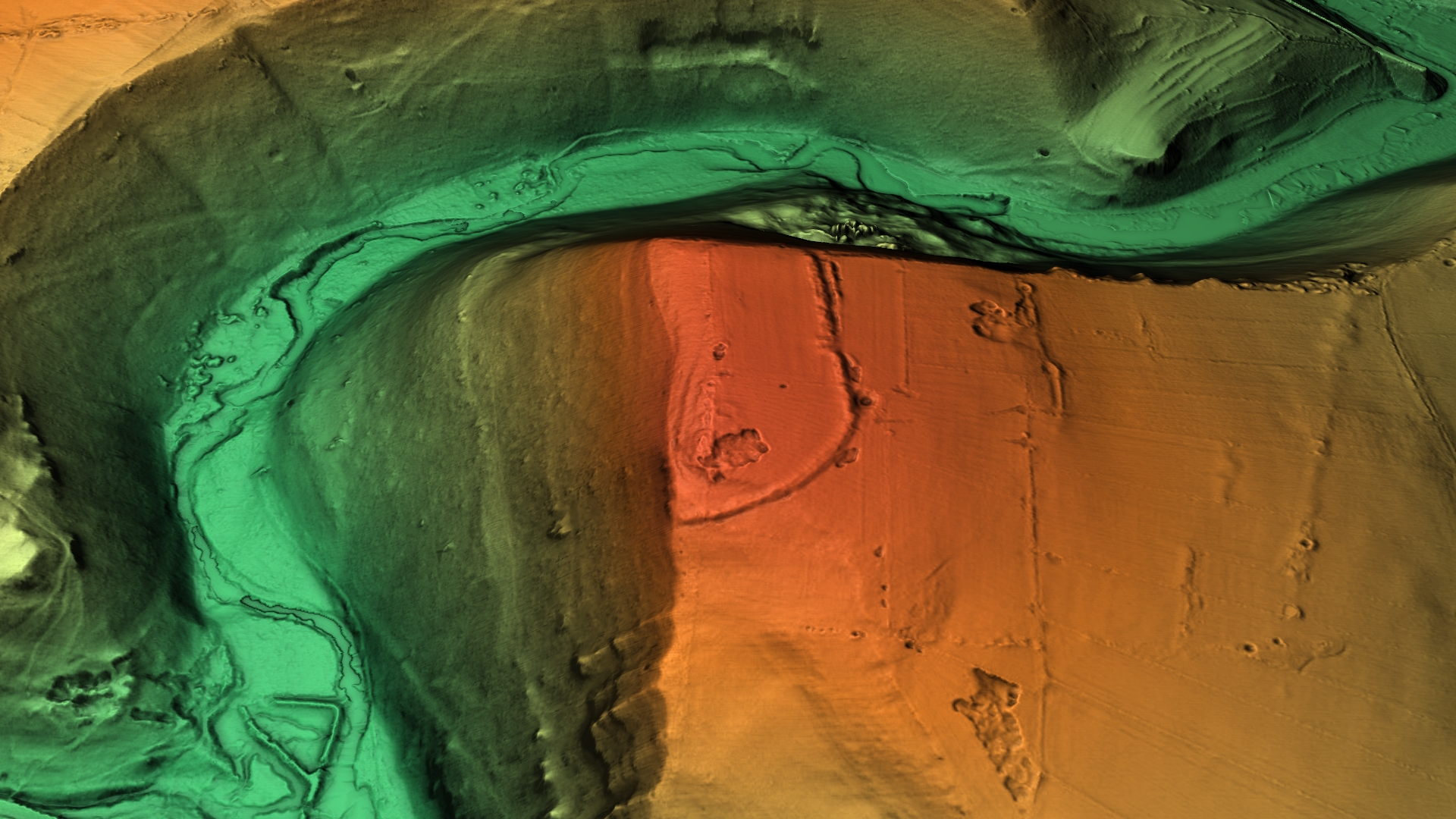
3D view of the digital terrain model

In 2011 excavations unearthed a mass burial containing only women and children, probably massacred after the fort was attacked, the first such segregated burial in Iron Age Britain. Some animal bones were also found, suggesting the inhabitants kept livestock. The remains were relatively well preserved due to the limestone geology of the hill. Carbon dating of the site suggests it was constructed between 440BC and 390BC.
