= Pocklington Iron Age burial ground =

Archaeological site in Yorkshire, England

- Location within England
- 53.926110°N 0.767918°W
- Type: Burial ground
- Periods: Middle Iron Age
- Location: Pocklington, East Riding of Yorkshire, England

History
- Built: c. eighth–third centuries BC

Site notes
- Excavation dates: 2014–present

The Pocklington Iron Age burial ground is a prehistoric cemetery discovered in 2014 on the outskirts of Pocklington in the East Riding of Yorkshire, England. Excavations carried out on an ongoing basis since then, have uncovered more than 160 skeletons and more than 70 square barrows thought to date to the Middle Iron Age that are attributed to the Arras culture, an ancient British culture of East Yorkshire. A variety of grave goods have been found along with the human remains, including weapons, beads, pots, and a rare chariot burial.

== Description ==
The burial ground consists of several dozen barrows located off Burnby Lane on the southeastern edge of Pocklington. They were discovered during the construction of a new housing development by David Wilson Homes. The area is known for previous Iron Age discoveries, so as a condition of planning permission, the developer was required to fund archaeological fieldwork. An initial geophysical survey of the site was carried out by the Malton-based MAP Archaeological Practice Ltd in 2014, which identified at least ten square burial mounds, each of which was situated within a small enclosure. A double-ditched trackway also was identified by an aerial survey; it is associated with eight probable square barrows and a square enclosure located north of the site. Excavations have continued since then, unearthing more than 160 skeletons and more than 74 square barrows.

== Finds ==
A number of notable discoveries have been made at the site, including weapons, brooches, pots, and hundreds of amber and glass beads buried alongside human remains. In one barrow the remains of a warrior were found. He had been placed on top of his shield – the first example of a shield burial to have been found in Britain. In 2016, the well-preserved remains of another warrior aged between 17 and 23 years old were discovered. A broken sword had been placed by his side, which had probably been broken as part of a funeral ritual. The skeleton also was interred with five spears that had been used ritually to pierce the warrior's body. Four had been placed along his spine and another in his groin, probably as part of a ritual to release his spirit. Another skeleton was found with severe injuries inflicted by at least two weapons, buried face-down, and at an unusual depth. The uncommon nature of this burial may have been intended to prevent an unquiet spirit from rising to haunt the living.

In 2017, the ongoing excavations uncovered a rare chariot burial comprising an Iron Age chariot and two horses dated to about BC 320 to 174. Although chariot burials have been found elsewhere in the UK, the one at Pocklington is the first to have been found with horses also interred, which had been positioned in a standing position in the grave. The chariot was intact and upright rather than dismantled, which is also unusual in the UK. The remains of the presumed driver, most likely a high-status individual, also were found, along with iron fragments from the chariot's body. The wooden elements of the chariot had rotted away, but had mostly been preserved as stains in the ground. One wheel had been destroyed, probably by ploughing. The metal tyres had survived, each forged as a continuous ring of iron rather than strip welded into a hoop indicating sophisticated metalworking skills. A bronze shield in the grave was exceptionally well preserved.

The shield's boss bears a resemblance to the Wandsworth shield boss (circa BC 350 to 150), owned by the British Museum. One design element on the Pocklington shield, a scalloped border, "is not comparable to any other Iron Age finds across Europe, adding to its valuable uniqueness", said Paula Ware, managing director at MAP Archaeological Practice Ltd. "The discoveries are set to widen our understanding of the Arras (Middle Iron Age) culture and the dating of artefacts to secure contexts is exceptional," Ware added.

== Dating and analysis ==
The burial grounds in Pocklington are believed to date to some time between the eighth to the third or fourth centuries BC. The finds have been ascribed to the Arras culture, an archaeological culture of the Middle Iron Age that is known mainly from East Yorkshire. Previous Arras culture burial sites have been typified by burials in round and square enclosures, as well as chariot burials. The area is known to have been inhabited by a Celtic tribe called the Parisi, so it is possible that the Pockington burials represent either the Parisi or their ancestors.

== See also ==
Newbridge chariot - another example of an intact chariot burial in Newbridge, Scotland
