= Knowe of Swandro =

The Knowe of Swandro
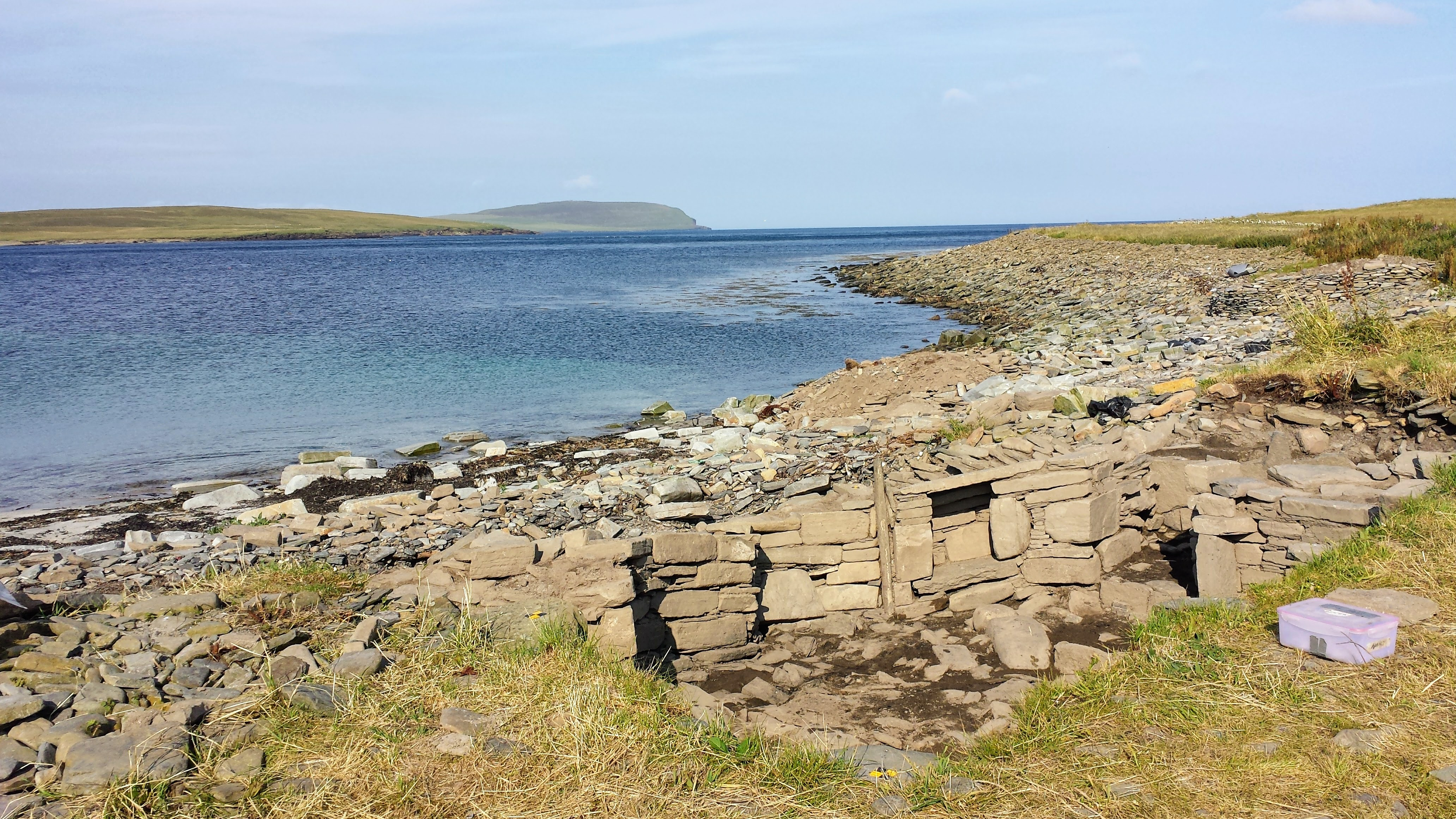
- An image of a Pictish building excavated at the Knowe of Swandro, looking out towards Costa Hill on the mainland Orkney

- 59°8′57″N 3°5′38″W
- Type: tumulus, chambered cairn, roundhouse, multiperiod settlement
- Periods: Neolithic, Iron Age, Pictish, Viking, Norse
- Location: Rousay
- Region: Orkney Islands, Scotland

Site notes
- Excavation dates: 2010 to present
- Archaeologists: University of Bradford
- Public access: Yes, seasonally
- Website: https://www.swandro.co.uk/
- Excavation supported by the Orkney Islands Council and Historical Environment Scotland, and the formation of the Swandro-Orkney Coastal Archeology Trust

The Knowe of Swandro is an archaeological site located on the Bay of Swandro on Rousay in Orkney, Scotland. The site consists of a 5000-year-old Neolithic chambered tomb, the remains of an Iron Age settlement that consists of Iron Age roundhouses and Pictish buildings, and two Viking age buildings. The Knowe of Swandro site is located directly on the beach and is being rapidly destroyed by coastal erosion.

In February 2024, the Knowe of Swandro project won the Current Archaeology Award for Rescue Project of the Year.

== Location ==
The Knowe of Swandro sits partly below the high tide mark under a boulder beach on the Bay of Swandro. The site was initially thought to be the remains of a broch since only the mound was visible, but the surrounding structures were discovered in 2010 by Dr Julie Bond when she spotted the worn, partially-buried uprights that formed part of a prehistoric building while walking along the beach.

Because of its location directly on the boulder beach, the Knowe of Swandro site is being rapidly destroyed by coastal erosion. The excavation has been focused on the seaward side, since it is at the highest risk of destruction by the sea. Despite the constant erosion, the archaeology has survived surprisingly well thanks to the boulder beach, which has provided some level of protection to the deposits and architecture below. Rising sea levels and an increase in the frequency and intensity of stormy weather systems as a result of climate change are exacerbating and accelerating the process. Additionally, there is an aquifer beneath the site contributes to erosion as water from the aquifer flows towards the ocean. As the sea has eroded the site a series of terraces, the seaward side of the site has been more significantly eroded and has been cut down to the lower and earlier layers. The terraces ascend landwards and later features from the upper levels of archaeology are preserved.

Work began in 2010 to record as much information and data as possible about the site before it is washed away completely. Excavation has continued annually since then. No excavation took place in 2020 and 2021 due to the COVID-19 pandemic, but excavation resumed in 2022. In addition to recording record data about the site for future research, the excavation will help give a better understanding of how tidal and storm damage have affected the site. This information can be used to develop management strategies for the Swandro site and other sites facing similar coastal erosion.

The entire site is elevated. The mound covering the circular roundhouse is about 3 to 4 metres high today, though the building itself was probably originally at least two storeys high. The central roundhouse is surrounded by a series of buildings from the Iron Age and later date. The entire settlement was originally surrounded by a stone-revetted ditch, which was built over by the first century CE.

The multiperiod nature of the site has led to complex courses of structural development. Smaller buildings were often built on top of older buildings which has led to a very three-dimensional site. Buildings were also modified over time, sometimes with larger, older buildings being modified to contain smaller, newer buildings.

== The site ==
It is likely that the site at the Knowe of Swandro is what remains of a larger, high status settlement. There is extensive evidence of complex and high-quality metalworking and an abundance of copper, lead, and iron in the area. Ready access to materials and technology necessary for high quality metalworking was likely a major source of power for sites like the Knowe of Swandro, as well as other sites in Orkney and Shetland.

Animal bones with evidence of butchering may be an indicator that feasting and similar high-status activities occurred in the settlement. Several pieces of Roman glass dating to the first century CE and Roman coins dating to the fourth century CE have been found at the site. Items such as these would have been valuable trade goods, but they also imply a greater level of connection than initially thought. The western coastline of Rousay and the coast of mainland Orkney on the other side of Eynhallow Sound were part of a major routeway through Orkney and a series of Iron Age settlements have been found along this route.

There is also evidence of extensive agriculture at the Knowe of Swandro. The botanical remains of cereals show that the settlement at Swandro had access to high-quality cereals in abundance, including bere, a kind of six-row hulled barley, and cultivated oats. There is evidence of grain processing areas and kilns used for drying cereals. The abundance of cereals is another factor that made settlements successful. Additionally, in the fields beyond the site are anthropogenic soils, which indicates long term human inhabitation and cultivation. The climate in Orkney was likely more mild in the Iron Age than it has been in recent history which would have lent itself to agriculture on this scale.

== Surveying and recording methods ==
The surveying of the site assists in the interpretation of ongoing excavation, and has been undertaken on the landward side of the site for this purpose. A number of surveying techniques have been utilized, including detailed earth resistance survey, electromagnetic survey, ground penetrating radar, and electrical resistivity tomography in surveys carried out by the University of Bradford. In 2019 extensive surveying was undertaken and these techniques were used to collect data at multiple depths to gain a better understanding of the site. Some of these techniques were more effective than others. The data given by the round penetrating radar was ambiguous, as the salinity of the soil negatively impacted the depth to which it could see. The data yielded by the ground penetrating radar did not give a solid measurement of the depth of the archaeology, but it did show that there were more buildings concentrated around the mound. Electrical resistivity tomography was extremely successful and was able to provide data about both the depth and the extent of the archaeology. The electrical resistivity tomography was able to confirm that the settlement was focused along the coastline. It also indicated the presence of water in lower archaeological layers, information that is vital to the management of the Knowe of Swandro and similar sites. The detailed earth resistance survey indicated that the large central roundhouse was surrounded by subsidiary buildings, which suggests the settlement was a nucleated village.

The recording of the remains of the settlement at the Knowe of Swandro is especially important because of its inevitable destruction via coastal erosion. The site is being recorded photographically with 3D scanning and with aerial imaging so that when the site is destroyed by the sea the permanent record can be used for future study. The lessons that are being learnt about the erosion processes and their effects on archaeology will help in understanding and mitigating the risks to similar sites. The lessons are important to record so the info can be referenced later as learning about site or studies in wider archaeological contexts allows for comparison between years, which helps in understanding how to interpret sites similar, dealing with coastal erosion. techniques used to record sites include archaeological drawings, photography, 3D scanning and aerial imaging.

== Key structures ==
The Knowe of Swandro site is made up of a possible chambered cairn and the remains of an Iron Age settlement that dates from between 1000 BCE and 1200 CE consisting of Iron Age roundhouses and Pictish buildings, and Viking to Norse age buildings.

=== Chambered cairn ===
The most immediately visible feature of the Knowe of Swandro site is the eroding mound which covers the central roundhouse and a possible chambered cairn. The mound has been described as "the much-disturbed remains of a stony mound" in a publication account from 1946 and as a "mutilated turf-covered mount 1.5m. high, apparently containing the remains of a drystone structure" in a report from a field visit in 1967. At various points it has been thought to have been a Viking grave, a broch, or the remains of a roundhouse. The mound stands about four meters from the shoreline and is so close to the shore that the water level at high tide regularly reaches its outer walls.

In 2012 overlying beach was excavated by a team from the University of Bradford with students from City University New York and a circular structure formed by a series of concentric outer wall faces was revealed. At this point it was thought that the structure might be a Neolithic chambered cairn. The walls of the structure are more similar to the casement walls seen in Neolithic chambered cairns, which have a single outer face, rather than a broch, which has inner and outer walls. Each of the concentric walls of the cairn was backed by stone and had a midden core. It is now thought that some of the walls of this structure belonged to an earlier Iron Age structure, but that there may be a Neolithic structure at the core of the site. The 2012 excavations also revealed that the central structure was partially robbed at some point in its history. Further excavation has established that the robbery probably occurred in the Viking period and the disturbance was infilled with shillet and midden.

The seaward side of the cairn has been significantly damaged by erosion, but the main part of the site and the middens in the area have been protected by the seaward remains. As much of the cairn as possible is being excavated and recorded in order to be able to understand the archaeological sequence and record data for future study. In 2015 the cairn was completely scanned with a 3D scanner by Dr A Wilson of the University of Bradford and aerial photos were taken by Robert Friel and Lindsey Kemp. The site has been under active excavation for almost ten years, so it is possible to compare data from different years and see how erosion of the site has progressed in a relatively short period of time.

The rapid rate of erosion can be seen when comparing data from the 2012 excavation of the cairn to the data from the 2015 excavation season. In 2015 the section of the cairn that had been excavated in 2012 was re-excavated to investigate and record the level of damage caused by erosion. It was found that the outer walls of the cairn had been significantly eroded since they were first recorded in 2012. Much of the lower, seaward side of the outer casement wall had been removed by the sea thanks to heightened wave activity during the winter. The packing that was backfilled into the trench from the 2012 excavation had been badly eroded or replaced with beach material. Several large blocks from the lower section of the wall's facing had been completely removed, and some large stones that were angular at the time of the 2012 excavations were smoothed and rounded.

=== Structure 1 ===
Structure 1 is likely the remains of a large roundhouse. It is the earliest of the Iron Age buildings yet to be identified in the Knowe of Swandro Site. Very little remains of Structure 1, as is located on the beach and has been severely eroded by the ocean. The outer walls of Structure 1 are made of stone uprights and the floor is made of a single massive flagstone measuring about three meters in length. A mezzanine floor may have run around the perimeter of the inside of the building. There are slots carved into the flagstone that may have been the postholes for the uprights that may have supported this floor. Evidence of similar mezzanine floors dating to the Middle Iron Age was found at the Old Scatness site in Shetland, supporting this possibility.

Inside Structure 1 are the remains of a stone construction that is likely an oven of some sort. This oven is similar to an oven found in Structure 8 at Old Scatness. At this point hearths tended to be more for general use while ovens were for food production of a more specialized nature. The oven from Structure 8 at Old Scatness shows evidence that it may have been used to produce fish oil, and it is possible that the oven in Structure 1 at Swandro was used for a similar more specialized purpose. In addition to the oven, there is a large hearth.

Underneath Structure 1 there are deposits that, while severely eroded, are rich in environmental material which have provided some information about the crops grown in the settlement at Swandro. Manmade artefacts have also been found in these deposits, like Early Iron Age pottery and a seal tooth pendant.

A well has been found to the side of the structure.

=== Structure 2 ===
Structure 2 is the remains of an Iron Age and Pictish structure located on one of the upper erosion terraces, slightly southeast of Structure 1. Structure 2 is the remains of half of a cell-like circular structure. The seaward side of the structure has undergone a greater degree of erosion than the landward side. The floor of the structure is made of large flagstones and there is evidence of an orthostatic division being added to the building later. In 2016 the orthostats were removed to reveal the original layout of the building. The curved line of orthostats, along with the placement of a door sill, indicate that the entrance to the structure was on the western side of the building. When entering Structure 2 one of the orthostat blocks would have blocked any movement to one's left, directing entry to the centre or right. This method of confining and redirecting movement in an entryway is also utilized in one of the Iron Age roundhouses at Old Scatness.

An oven-like feature, similar to that found in Structure 1, was found in Structure 2 The floor and hearth are part of a larger sequence of floors that indicate that the structure was modified several times over the course of its use. A rectangular tank made of stone was found inside the building under the flagstone floor, as well as evidence of metalworking. In 2017 the flagstones were removed and the sequence of ash, mixed ‘midden-like’ material, and stone packing beneath the building was investigated. During this excavation a Nummus of Constans, dating to sometime between 348 and 350 CE, was found.

=== Structure 3 ===
Structure 3 is an Iron Age building that dates to the first century CE, though it was originally thought to be Pictish due to its semi-subterranean nature and evidence of sophisticated metalworking. Structure 3 was likely a smithy and is located on an upper terrace towards the landward side of the site. The building was infilled at some point, though the exact date this occurred is known. The eastern part of the structure has been truncated by the wall of one of the Norse houses. Structure 3 is built over two earlier walls that run parallel to each other. These walls may be the remains of a ditch that was made to defend the early settlement, similar to the remains of the ditches seen at Midhowe. Geophysical survey suggests that the ditch extends around the landwards side of the site and onto what is now the beach.

On the western side of the structure there is a short passageway and two stone steps. Additionally, there is a curved passageway that leads from the northern section of the building inwards. The stone steps in this passageway display wear patterns that would be consistent with the wear of past occupants walking through the passageway. There is a threshold stone and a bolt hole, which indicates that there would have been a door dividing the passageway and the central room. There is also evidence that the doorway could be barred from both the inside and the outside. The location of the doorway, the ability to shut the door, and the semi-subterranean nature of Structure 2 would have been effective means to minimize the natural light that could enter the building. Being able to accurately observe the colour of the flame would have been necessary to gauge metal temperature, and less ambient light would have facilitated this.

The southern wall of the smithy was the first part of the structure to be identified and excavated. Evidence of a cupboard built into the wall of the structure was revealed. The cupboard would have been to the smith's left and may have been used for storage or as a place for a lamp. In the center of the room there are the remains of a hearth which appeared to have had two phases of use. Nearby lies a large beach stone that may have once stood upright adjacent to the hearth. This stone has evidence of wear that suggests that it may have been used as an anvil. Another stone anvil was found in Structure 3 that shows the remains of fingerprints composed of a carbon deposit. The hearth furnishings and the sophisticated layout of the structure indicate that Structure 3 was likely a purpose-built smithy.

An abundance of metalworking material has been found in and under Structure 3, including mould fragments, slag, and hammer scale form smithing. In the lower levels of archaeology beneath the rubble infill slag, small crucibles, and mould fragments were found along with evidence of copper alloy. More evidence of metalworking was found in 2017 during an investigation aided by archaeometallurgist Dr Gerry McDonnell, including part of a tuyère made of fired clay. The placement of the tuyère fragments in the room suggests that the bellows were located on the right side of the hearth. This building is significant because it establishes the presence of high-status metalworking at Swandro at a relatively early date.

A small piece of plastic was found in the rubble infill beneath Structure 3, even though the floors above the infill it was found in were undamaged. This plastic fragment was likely forced in by the pressure of tidal and storm surges, which are simultaneously removing finer particles from the archaeological sediments. The walling of Structure 3 has been affected by this erosive action, which seems to be what caused the wall to sink into the top of the infilled ditch that runs beneath the smithy.

=== Structure 4 ===
Structure 4 is the remains of a Pictish building, and it may be the latest of the structures that has been investigated at Swandro. The structure is partially truncated; the majority of the landward side of the building has survived, but the seaward side has mostly been destroyed. The floor of the building survives and the flagging is consistent across the floor. There is a hearth built into the wall that is similar to one found at Old Scatness, which shows evidence of having been used for drying barley. In Structure 4 at Swandro barley has been found in the hearth and on the floor near the kiln. This indicates that this may have been a threshing floor with a drying kiln.

=== Structure 5 ===
Structure 5 is a cell contained within Structure 6, the large, central roundhouse. Structure 5 is sectioned off with a wall in part formed by a large ring of upright orthostats. In the Late Iron Age the cell was blocked off from the central area by a stone wall. Structure 5 has multiple hearths and contains a small, private cell in the corner, which has been sectioned off with orthostats. The remains of a coating of bright yellow clay is preserved on the walls. This clay layer would have coated the walls would have made the interior much lighter than if the stones were uncoated. There are multiple layers of floor surface in Structure 5, each layered on top of each other. One of the upper floor surfaces revealed evidence of several hearths, a long-handled weaving comb made of bone, and two Roman glass bottles, which indicates that this level dated to somewhere between the first century to the early second century CE. Additional artefacts found include two glass toggle beads, a bone spindle whorl, bone needles, and a top stone of a rotary quern, which was set into the floor.

Structure 5 was filled with midden rich in bone and burnt stone after the entryway was sealed. Three articulated bird skeletons were found, along with many other bird bones including the skull of a white-tailed eagle and great auk bones. More common bones like those of sheep, cattle, fish, red deer, and pigs were also found. Large cod vertebrates were found, which is unusual in that it provides evidence for deep sea fishing. Additionally, small fish bones were found in abundance. This might indicate that, like Old Scatness, the Swandro settlement was involved in the production of fish oil. Many of the animal bones in the midden show signs of having been butchered with a large blade. This is unusual, as it is uncommon for Iron Age settlements in the northern islands to have access to this type of metal.

=== Structure 6 ===
Structure 6 is a large roundhouse that likely dates to the Early Iron Age. It was originally thought that the outer walls of Structure 6 were part of a chambered tomb, but radiocarbon dating and excavations on the landward side of the structure reveal an inner wall that suggests that it is instead an Iron Age roundhouse. The radiocarbon dating indicates that early layers of the roundhouse date to sometime between 800 and 400 BCE. Structure 6 appears to have been in use for an extended period of time, possibly up to a millennium. Because of this long period of use the roundhouse is architecturally complex, as it has been modified and expanded numerous times. In the Late Iron Age Structure 6 was subdivided into smaller sections. A dividing wall formed a large cell to the landward side of the passage, known as Structure 5. The roundhouse was monumental in proportion and was likely an important site in the settlement from the time of its construction through to the Late Iron Age. There is also evidence that some of the wall faces from the eroding portion of the roundhouse may have been part of a different, much earlier structure.

The entryway of Structure 6 is on the landward side of the building and leads into a central passageway with single-faced walls. The central passageway seems to have been modified at some point in the Late Iron Age. Inside the roundhouse there is an unidentified feature that takes the form of a corbelled cell inset into the floor. This feature may be a well similar to the one found outside of Structure 1, though the construction of the feature is quite different and is more reminiscent of an underground chamber. The feature is filled with fresh water from an aquifer that is present beneath the entire site On the outside of the structure, to the side of the passageway, is a small cell-like structure similar to the guardhouses seen in brochs.

In the side passages of Structure 6 there are many fallen slabs that used to be part of the building. The roof was smashed and the two orthostats, which may have been the lintels that supported the doorway, have fallen inwards towards the centre of the roundhouse. After the building collapsed it was infilled and the material used to do this shows evidence of a Viking settlement, including several cat skeletons and a tiny coin of Eanred, King of Northumbria. The coin dates to 810 to 850 CE and many coins such as this one are the result of Viking trade and travel, which strengthens the connection between the destruction of Structure 6 and the arrival of the Norse in the area. The period of use of Structure 6 seems to have ended with the building's destruction.

=== Norse houses ===
The Norse houses at the Knowe of Swandro were originally excavated in the 1940s and then in the 1970s, though excavations have not been published. These Norse houses are often referred to as the site of ‘Westness’.There are at least two houses which lay on the landward side of the site. These buildings appear to have been built on top of earlier Iron Age structures and in some cases cut through the Iron Age structures. This indicates that the Viking settlement was not separate from the Iron Age settlement but rather a separate, final stage of the Swandro settlement. The Viking inhabitants of the site did not use the site in the same way as the previous inhabitants, which suggests that there was little interest in assimilation. The Swandro site would have likely been a highly attractive site for a group looking for a new place to inhabit with its bountiful agriculture, an advantageous location for travel and trade, and the abundance of natural resources such as iron, copper, and lead.

In addition to the houses themselves, in the 19th century a Viking age sword was found while ploughing was taking place in a nearby field.

== See also ==
- Midhowe Broch
- Old Scatness
- Mine Howe
