= List of fellows of the Society of Antiquaries of London =

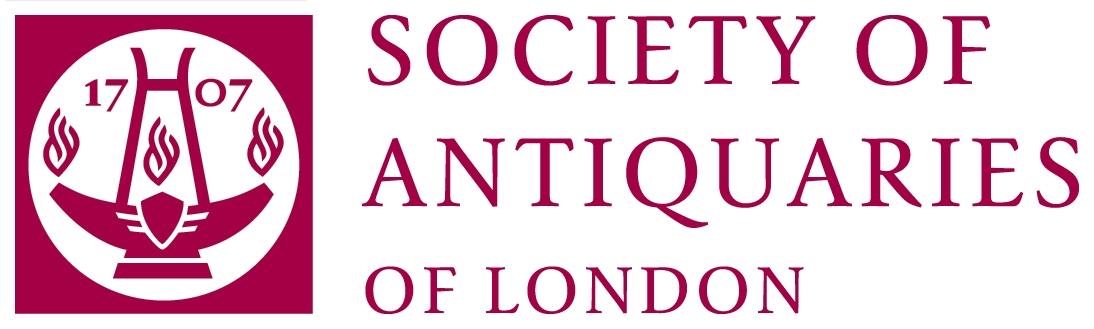

This is an incomplete list of Fellows of the Society of Antiquaries of London. The award, denoted by the post-nominals FSA, is awarded to Fellows of the Society of Antiquaries of London, a learned society founded in 1707.

== A–C ==
- Silke Ackermann; elected 2005
- Robert Adam, FRS (1728–1792); elected 1861
- Will Adam, FRHistS (b. 1969)
- Sophia Adams
- Donald Adamson, FRSL (1939–2004)
- John Adamson; elected 2019
- Peter Addyman, CBE (b. 1939), archaeologist
- Stewart Ainsworth (b. 1951), archaeologist
- William Francis Ainsworth, FRGS (1807–1896); elected 1853
- John Yonge Akerman (1806–1873); elected 1834
- Leslie Alcock, OBE, FRSE (1925–2006), archaeologist
- Miranda Aldhouse-Green (b. 1947)
- Michelle Alexander; elected 2022
- John Allan, CB, FBA (1884–1955), numismatist
- Bridget Allchin (1927–2017)
- Bruce Allsopp, FRIBA (1912–2000)
- Sophie T. Ambler, FRHistS
- R. C. Anderson, FRHistS (1883–1976)
- Robert G. W. Anderson, FRSC (b. 1944)
- George Paget, 7th Marquess of Anglesey, FRSL, FRHistS (1922–2013)
- John Anstis (1708–1754), Garter King of Arms
- Sir Ian Anstruther (1922–2007)
- Francis Arundell (1780–1846)
- Thomas Ashby, FBA (1874–1931), archaeologist
- Sir Leigh Ashton (1897–1983)
- Mick Aston (1946–2013)
- Sir David Attenborough, OM (b. 1926)
- John Lubbock, 1st Baron Avebury, FRS (1834–1913)
- Sir Joseph Ayloffe, FRS (1708–1781)
- Richard Barber, FRSL, FRHistS (b. 1941)
- Sir Frederick Barnard, FRS (1743–1830)
- Sir John Barrow, FRS (1764–1848)
- Patrick Baty, FSA Scot (b.1956)
- Sir Wyke Bayliss (1835–1906)
- Dame Mary Beard, FBA (b. 1955)
- Simon Beattie (b. 1975)
- Alison Betts
- Robert Bigsby (1806–1873)
- Barbara Birley
- Revd William Henry Black (1808–1872)
- John Thomas Blight (1835–1911)
- Chiara Bonacchi
- Very Revd Peniston Booth, FRS (1681–1765)
- Barbara Borg (b. 1960)
- William Copeland Borlase, MP (1848–1899)
- Valerie Bott, MBE; elected 2020
- Emrys G. Bowen, FRGS (1900–1983)
- Gail Boyle
- Charles Angell Bradford, FRSL (1864–1940)
- George Weare Braikenridge (1775–1856)
- John Braithwaite (1797–1870)
- William Bray (1736–1832)
- David Breeze, OBE (b. 1944), archaeologist
- Owen Salusbury Brereton, FRS (1715–1798)
- John Bridges (1666–1724)
- John Egerton, 7th Earl of Bridgewater, FRS (1753–1823)
- Christopher Brooke, CBE, FBA
- John Charles Brooke (1748–1794), Somerset Herald
- Lyde Brown (died 1787)
- Sue Brunning, early medieval archaeologist
- Richard Temple-Nugent-Brydges-Chandos-Grenville, 2nd Duke of Buckingham and Chandos, KG (1797–1861); elected 1840
- John Buckler, FRIBA (1770–1851)
- Sir Henry Farnham Burke, KCVO (1859–1930), Garter King of Arms
- Peter Burman, MBE
- Charles Bury, 1st Earl of Charleville, FRS (1764–1835); elected 1814
- John Caley (1760–1834)
- Matthew Canepa (b. 1975), art historian
- Tobias Capwell (b. 1972), medieval historian and curator; elected 2011
- Henry Herbert, 4th Earl of Carnarvon, KP, FRS (1831–1890)
- Adam Nicolson, 5th Baron Carnock, FRSL (b. 1957)
- George Alfred Carthew (1807–1882)
- Egerton Castle (1858–1920), author and swordsman
- Richard Stephen Charnock (1820–1905), lawyer, topographer, and antiquary
- Rt Revd Richard Chartres, GCVO, PC (b. 1947), Bishop of London
- Clive Cheesman (b. 1968), Norroy & Ulster King of Arms
- Bridget Cherry, OBE
- Stephen Church
- Eugene Ch'ng
- J. Desmond Clark, CBE (1916–2002), archaeologist; elected 1952
- Kate Clark
- Sir Charles Travis Clay, CB, FBA (1885–1978), antiquary and librarian; elected 1912
- Thomas Close (1796–1881)
- Revd William Cole (1714–1782)
- Bryony Coles, FBA (b. 1946)
- Revd John Collinson (1757–1793)
- Marion Colthorpe (d. 2021), Elizabethan historian
- Sir Patrick Cormack, FRHistS (1939–2024)
- George Richard Corner (1801–1863)
- Eleri Cousins
- William Cowper (1701–1767), physician and antiquarian
- Revd J. Charles Cox (1843–1919), author
- David Lindsay, 27th Earl of Crawford, KT, FRS (1871–1940)
- Joseph Mordaunt Crook, CBE, FBA (b. 1937)
- Sir Thomas Gery Cullum (1741–1831), Bath King of Arms
- Vicki Cummings, prehistoric archaeologist
- Sir Barry Cunliffe, CBE, FBA (b. 1939)
- James Stevens Curl (1937–2025), architectural historian
- Cecil Curle (1901–1987), archaeologist
- Anne Curry, FRHistS (b. 1954)

== D–G ==
- Ken Dark, FRHistS (b. 1961)
- Sir Geoffrey de Bellaigue, FBA (1931–2013)
- Beatrice de Cardi, OBE, FBA (1914–2016)
- Christopher de Hamel, FRHistS (b. 1950)
- Guy de la Bédoyère (b. 1957)
- Claudine Dauphin (b. 1950)
- Brenda Dickinson
- Porphyrios Dikaios (1904-1971)
- Harold Dillon, 17th Viscount Dillon, CH, FBA (1844–1932)
- Brian Dobson (1931–2012), scholar of Hadrian's Wall
- Chloë Duckworth
- Claire Donovan, FRHistS (d. 2019)
- Penelope Dransart
- Margaret Stefana Drower, MBE (1911–2012)
- Timothy Duke, CVO (b. 1953)
- Elizabeth Eames (1918–2008)
- Hella Eckardt
- Judie English (1947–2025)
- Elisabeth Ettlinger (1915–2012)
- Sir Arthur Evans, FBA (1851–1941)
- Dame Joan Evans (1893–1977)
- Sir John Evans, FRS (1823–1908)
- John Davies Evans, OBE (1925–2011)
- Gail Falkingham
- Richard Farmer, FRS (1735–1797)
- Helen Farr
- Thomas Godfrey Faussett (1829–1877)
- Neil Faulkner (b. 1958)
- Eric Fernie, CBE, FBA (b. 1939)
- Herschell Filipowski (1816–1872)
- Robin Fleming, historian
- Hannah Fluck
- Martin Folkes, FRS (1690–1754)
- Aileen, Lady Fox (1907–2005)
- Sir Cyril Fox, FBA (1882–1967)
- Robert Fox, FRHistS (b. 1938)
- John Frederick France, FRCS (1817–1900)
- Sir Augustus Wollaston Franks, FRS (1826–1897)
- John Frere, FRS (1740–1807)
- Charles Frost (1781–1862)
- Vincent Gaffney
- Helen Geake (b. 1967)
- Margaret Gelling, OBE, FBA (1924–2009)
- Peter Gibson, OBE (1929–2016)
- Mark Girouard (b. 1931)
- Philippa Glanville, OBE (b. 1943)
- Prince Richard, Duke of Gloucester, KG, FRIBA (b. 1944)
- John Goodall (b. 1970)
- Chris Gosden, FBA, FAHA (b. 1955)
- Lindy Grant
- Susan Greaney
- Frances Griffith
- Ven. David Griffiths (1927–2012)
- Sir Loyd Grossman, FRHistS (b. 1950)
- John Mathew Gutch (1778–1861)

== H–L ==
- William Debonaire Haggard, FRAS (d. 1886)
- Catherine Haith (d. 2025)
- Helena Hamerow, FBA
- Sue Hamilton
- Donald Hankey, 3rd Baron Hankey, FRIBA (b. 1938)
- Phil Harding, DL (b. 1950)
- Edward Harris, MBE (b. 1946)
- Jessica Harrison-Hall (b. 1965)
- Edwin Sidney Hartland (1848–1927)
- Brian Hartley (1929–2005)
- Elizabeth Hartley (1947–2018)
- Kay Hartley (1929–2025)
- Barbara Harvey, CBE, FBA (1928–2025), historian
- John Harvey (1911–1997), architectural historian
- Edward Hawkins, FRS (1780–1867)
- Kayt Hawkins, archaeologist
- Max Hebditch, CBE (b. 1937)
- Wilfrid James Hemp (1882–1962)
- Donald Henson (1956–2021)
- Georgina Herrmann, OBE, FBA (b. 1937), archaeologist
- Walter Abel Heurtley, OBE (1882–1955)
- Mabel Blundell Heynemann (1866–1952), archaeologist
- Dan Hicks (b. 1972), archaeologist
- Peter Hinton, OBE (b. 1948), archaeologist
- R. J. Hopper (1910–1987), archaeologist
- Mark Horton (b. 1956), archaeologist
- William Hosking, FRIBA (1800–1861)
- Henry Howard, FRS (1757–1842)
- Alfred Hudd, FCA (1846–1920)
- Cecil Humphery-Smith, OBE (1928–1981)
- Revd Joseph Hunter (1783–1861)
- John Hurst, FBA (1927–2003), archaeologist
- Capt Alfred Hutton (1839–1910), antiquarian, writer and swordsman
- Edward Impey, FRHistS
- Henry Jenner (1848–1934)
- Sarah Jennings (1947–2009)
- Kenneth Hamilton Jenkin (1900–1980)
- Simon Swynfen Jervis (b. 1943)
- Barri Jones (1936–1999)
- Laurence Keen, OBE, FRHistS (b. 1943), archaeologist
- Alison Kelly (1913–2016)
- Alexander James Kent, FRGS (b. 1977)
- Sir Frederic G. Kenyon, FBA (1863–1952)
- Helen Wickstead
- Heather Knight
- Kristina Krawiec
- Kristian Kristiansen (b. 1948), Danish prehistorian (Honorary Fellow)
- Peter Kurrild-Klitgaard, FRHistS (b. 1966), Danish political scientist and armorist
- Nina Frances Layard, FLS (1853–1935) poet, prehistorian and archaeologist; elected 1921
- Ven. Egerton Leigh (1702–1760), Archdeacon of Shropshire
- Peter Le Neve, FRS (1661–1729), Norroy King of Arms
- Sir Timothy Laurence, FRICS (b. 1955)
- Carenza Lewis (b. 1964)
- Jodie Lewis
- Leonardo López Luján, FBA (b. 1964), Mexican archaeologist (Honorary Fellow)
- Lisa Lodwick (d. 2022)
- Frederick Lukis (1788–1871)
- Revd William Collings Lukis (1817–1892), seigneur of Sark
- Samuel Lysons, FRS (1763–1819)
- Rt Revd Charles Lyttelton, FRS (1714–1768)

== M–P ==
- Jean Macdonald (1920–2021)
- Sir Eric Maclagan, KCVO (1879–1951)
- Michael Maclagan, CVO, FRHistS (1914–2003)
- Sir James Mann, KCVO, FBA (1897–1962)
- Revd Owen Manning, FRS (1721–1801)
- Queen Margrethe II of Denmark (b. 1940)
- Pamela Marshall
- Thomas Martin (1697–1771)
- Jack Martineau (1904–1982)
- Herbert Maryon, OBE, FIIC (1874–1965)
- Jacqueline McKinley
- Ven. David Meara (b. 1939), Archdeacon of London
- Roger Mercer, OBE (1944–2018)
- Alan Millard (1937–2024)
- Very Revd Jeremiah Milles (1714–1784)
- Revd Philip Morant (1700–1770)
- Edward Rowe Mores (1731–1778)
- Rosalind Moss (1890–1990)
- Quita Mould
- Penelope Mountjoy
- Geoffrey Munn, OBE, MVO (b. 1953)
- Oswyn Murray (b. 1937)
- J. N. L. Myres, CBE, FBA (1902–1989)
- Peter Le Neve, FRS (1661–1729), Norroy King of Arms
- Philip Norman (1842–1931)
- Peter O'Donoghue, FHS (b. 1971)
- George Ormerod, FRS (1785–1873)
- Richard Ovenden, OBE, FRHistS (b. 1964)
- Revd Elias Owen (1833–1899)
- Hugh Owen (1808–1897)
- Sir Francis Palgrave, KH, FRS (1788–1861)
- Naomi Payne
- Sir Charles Reed Peers, CBE, FBA (1868–1952)
- Sara Perry
- James Peill (b. 1971), Bluemantle Pursuivant
- Paul B. Pettitt
- John-Henry Phillips
- Stuart Piggott, CBE, FBA (1910–1996)
- Giovanni Battista Piranesi (1720–1778)
- Jane Portal (b. 1955)
- Sir D'Arcy Power, KBE, FRCS (1855–1941)
- Francis Pryor, MBE (b. 1945)
- James Pulman (1783–1859), Clarenceux King of Arms

== Q–S ==
- Anthony Quiney (b. 1981)
- Philip Rashleigh, FRS, MP (1729–1811)
- Benedict Read (b. 1945), art historian
- Sir Hercules Read, FBA (1857–1929)
- Julian Reade
- Sir Charles Reed (1819–1881)
- Mary Remnant (1935–2020), musicologist and medievalist
- Colin Renfrew, Baron Renfrew of Kaimsthorn, FBA (1937–2024)
- Julian C. Richards (b. 1951)
- Julian D. Richards, OBE (b. 1958)
- Sir Ian Richmond, CBE, FBA (1902–1965)
- Augustus Lane-Fox-Pitt-Rivers, FRS (1827–1900)
- Edward Robert Robson, FRIBA (1836–1917)
- Ven. Charles Frederic Roberts (1862–1942)
- Sir Hugh Roberts, GCVO (b. 1948)
- Hon. Lady Roberts, DCVO (1949–2021)
- John Martin Robinson (b. 1948)
- Nicola Rogers
- John Gage Rokewode, FRS (d. 1842)
- Tanja Romankiewicz
- Margaret Joyce Rowe (1926–2020)
- Margaret Roxan (1924–2003)
- Edward Rudge, FRS (1763–1846), botanist
- Edward John Rudge, FRS (1792–1861), barrister
- Hannah Russ, FZS
- Miles Russell (b. 1967)
- Hugh Sackett (1928–2020)
- St Andrew St John, 14th Baron St John of Bletso, FRS (1759–1817)
- Sir John Sainty, KCB (1932–2025)
- Charles Sandys (1786–1859)
- Alan Saville (1946–2016); elected 1981
- Edgar Ronald Seary, FRHistS (1908–1984)
- Gertrud Seidmann (1919–2013)
- Ruth Shaffrey
- Richard Sharp, FRS, MP (1759–1835)
- John Shaw, FRS (1776–1832)
- J. Charles M. Shepard (1892–1962), graphic artist
- Sir John Silvester, FRS (1745–1822)
- Sir John Sinclair, FRS (1754–1835)
- Chris Skidmore, FRHistS, MP (b. 1981)
- Sir John Smith, FRS (1744–1807)
- Martin Ferguson Smith, OBE, FRHistS (b. 1940)
- Admiral William Henry Smyth, FRS (1788–1865)
- Kenneth Snowman, CBE (1919–2002)
- Sir John Soane (1753–1837)
- Marie Louise Stig Sørensen, FBA, FSA (b. 1954)
- Graham Speake (b. 1929)
- Albert Spencer, 7th Earl Spencer, TD (1892–1975)
- Flaxman C. J. Spurrell, FGS (1842–1915)
- James Leslie Starkey (1895–1938)
- David Starkey, CBE, FRHistS (b. 1945)
- John Steane (1931–2024)
- Rt Revd Thomas Stevens (1841–1920), Bishop of Barking
- Philip Stell, MBE, FRCS (1934–2004)
- Charles Stokes, FRS (1783–1853)
- Percy Stone, FRIBA (1856–1934)
- Sir Roy Strong, CH, FRSL (b. 1935)
- Revd William Stukeley, FRS (1687–1765)
- Merlin Hanbury-Tracy, 7th Baron Sudeley, TD (1939–2022)
- Jonathan Sumption, Lord Sumption, OBE, FRHistS (b. 1948)
- Rachel Swallow
- Brenda Swinbank (b. 1929)

== T–Z ==
- Toshiyuki Takamiya (b. 1944)
- Sir Andrew Taylor, FRIBA (1850–1937)
- Sir Richard Carnac Temple, CB, FBA
- James Theobald, FRS (1688–1759)
- Charles Thomas, CBE, FBA (1928–2016)
- Julian Thomas (b. 1959)
- Ivor Bulmer-Thomas, CBE
- Roberta Tomber (1954–2022)
- J. B. Trapp, CBE, FBA (1925–2005)
- Sir Walter Calverley Trevelyan, FGS (1797–1879)
- Charles Truman (1949–2017)
- Olga Tufnell (1905–1985)
- Percival Turnbull (1953–2016)
- Sarah Tyacke, CB, FRHistS (b. 1945), Keeper of Public Records and Chief Executive of the National Archives
- Henry Vaughan (1809–1899)
- John Venn, FRS (1834–1923), elected 1892
- Edward Vernon Utterson (1775–1856)
- George Vertue (1684–1756)
- Randolph Vigne, OLS (1928–2016)
- Caroline Vout, Reader in Classics and Fellow of Christ's College, Cambridge
- Susan Walker (b. 1948)
- Edith Mary Walker (1903–1970)
- Lacey Wallace (b. 1983)
- Philippa Walton (b. 1978), archaeologist
- James Ware, FRS (1756–1815), eye surgeon
- Sir John Watney (1834–1923), Hon. Secretary to the City & Guilds of London Institute
- Albert Way (1805–1874), 'director' 1842 till 1846
- Hilary Wayment, OBE (1912–2005)
- Edward Doran Webb, FRIBA (1864–1931)
- Emma J. Wells (b. 1986)
- Leslie Peter Wenham (1911–1990), Head of history at St. Johns' College, York.
- Stephen Weston, FRS (1747–1830)
- Sir Mortimer Wheeler, CH, FRS, FBA (1890–1976)
- Tessa Wheeler (1893–1936)
- John Whichcord Jr., FRIBA (1823–1885), architect
- Sir Samuel Whitbread, KCVO, FLS (1937–2023)
- Elisabeth Whittle, FRHS (b. 1948), garden historian
- David Wigg-Wolf (b. 1956), numismatist
- Toby Wilkinson, FRHistS (b. 1969)
- John William Willis-Bund, CBE (1843–1928)
- David Williams (1949–2017), archaeologist
- Sir Thomas Woodcock, KCVO, FHS (b. 1951), Garter King of Arms
- Charmian Woodfield (1929–2014), archaeologist
- Peter Woodman (1943–2017), archaeologist
- Michael Wood, OBE (b. 1948), historian
- Sir Albert Woods, GCVO (1816–1904), Garter King of Arms
- Kim Woods, art historian; elected 2005
- Daniel Woolf, FRHistS (b. 1958), academic
- Christopher Wright, OBE, FRHistS (b. 1949); elected 2002
- Michael Wright (b. 1948)
- Warwick William Wroth (1858–1911)
- Helen Wyld, museum curator
- Ruth Young, archaeologist; elected 2010
- Sir William Young, FRS (1749–1815)
- George Zarnecki, CBE, FBA (1915–2008)
- Andrew Ziminski, stonemason and author
