= Charles Sheppard =

Charles Sheppard may refer to:

- Charles Bernard Sheppard, lawyer, state legislator, and professor in Mississippi
- Charles Bradford Sheppard, American radio engineer

== See also ==
- Charles Shepard (disambiguation)
- Charles Shepherd (disambiguation)
