= Stonemason (disambiguation) =

A stonemason is a person engaged in stonecraft.

Stonemason may also refer to:

- The Stonemason, a play by American writer Cormac McCarthy
- The Stonemason (book), a book by Andrew Ziminski
- The Stonemason ostracon, a figured-limestone ostracon
