= Falkingham =

Falkingham is a surname. Notable people with the surname include:

- Edward Falkingham (c. 1683–1757), Royal Navy officer
- Gail Falkingham, British archaeologist, archivist, and curator
- Jonathan Falkingham (born c. 1962), British architect and property developer
- Josh Falkingham (born 1990), Scottish footballer
- Thomas Falkingham (1884–1957), English-born Australian politician

== See also ==
- Folkingham, English village
