= Tettina =

A Tettina (plural: tettinae), sometimes called a tettine, is a type of Roman ceramic vessel, traditionally thought to have been used as an infant feeding bottle.

== Form and use ==
Tettinae are usually made from ceramic and have a small spout and, sometimes, a handle. A 2025 study of this pottery type from Roman Britain by Kayt Hawkins identified 120 examples. A further three glass examples were identified, one from the Lankhills cemetery at Venta Belgarum and two in Colchester. Ceramic examples in Britain are usually made from locally sources fabrics.

Some organic residue analysis undertaken on the vessels shows that contain a variety of different fats, rather than only dairy fats, and so they were probably used for a variety of purposes. They retain a strong archaeological association with infant burials.

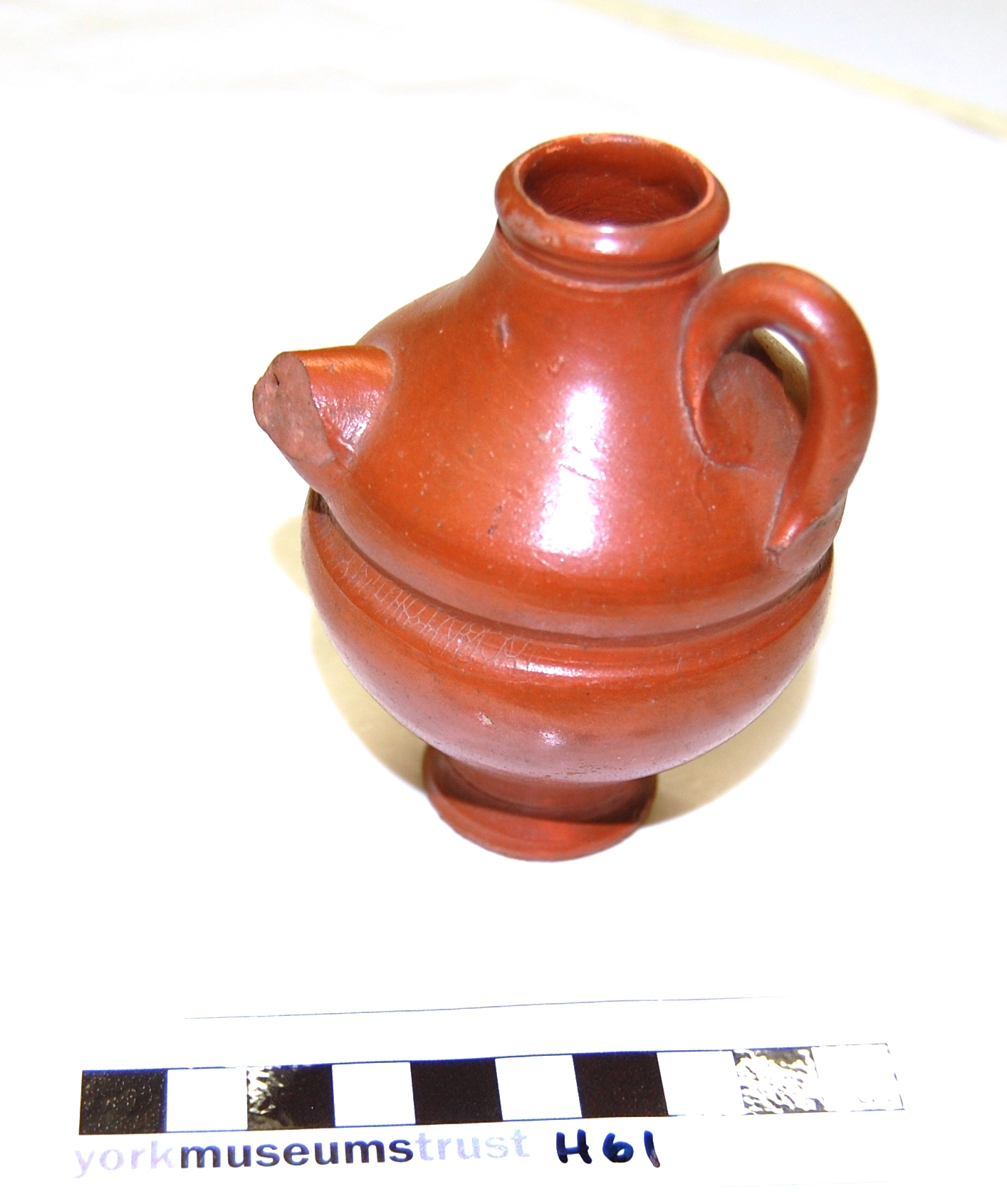

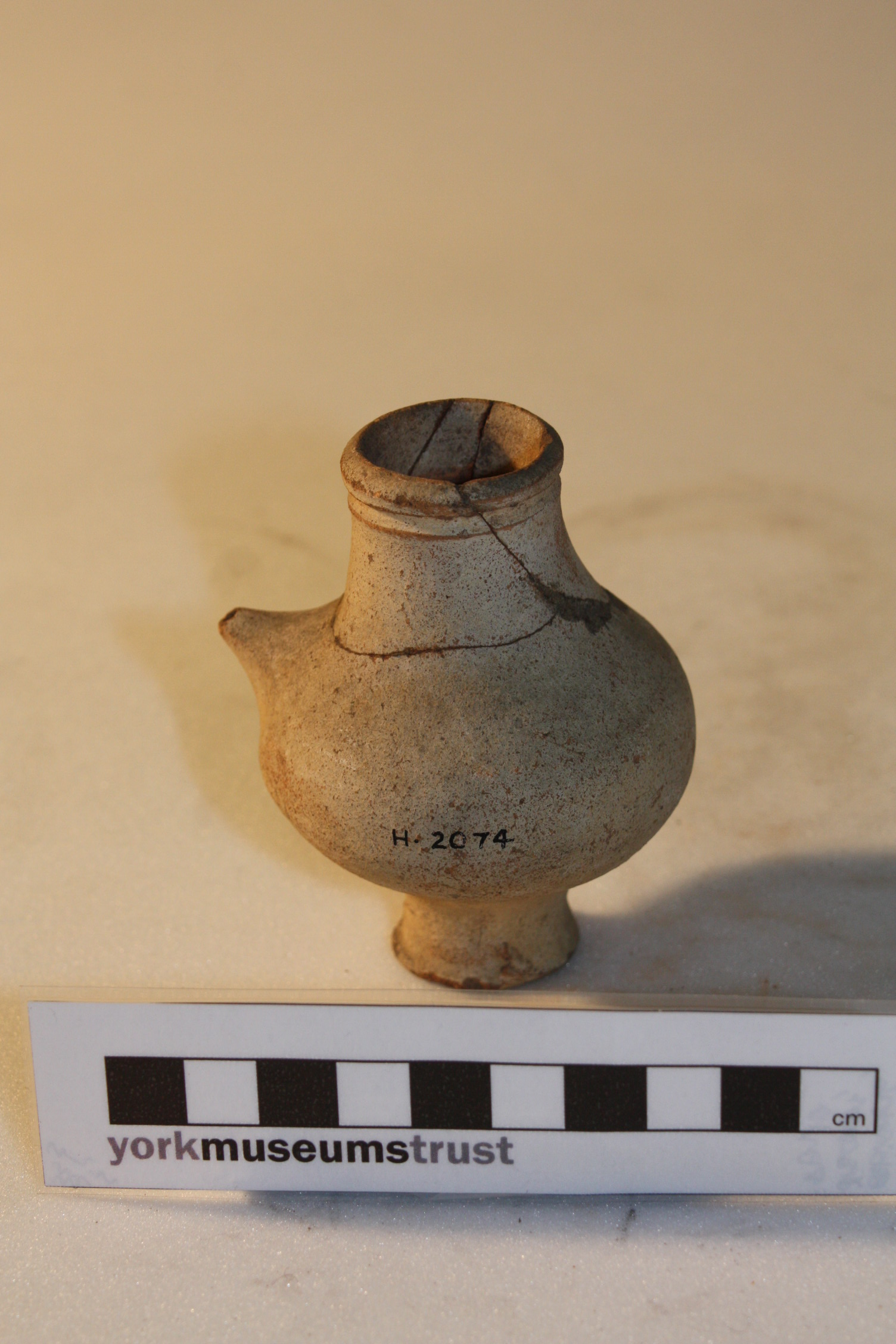

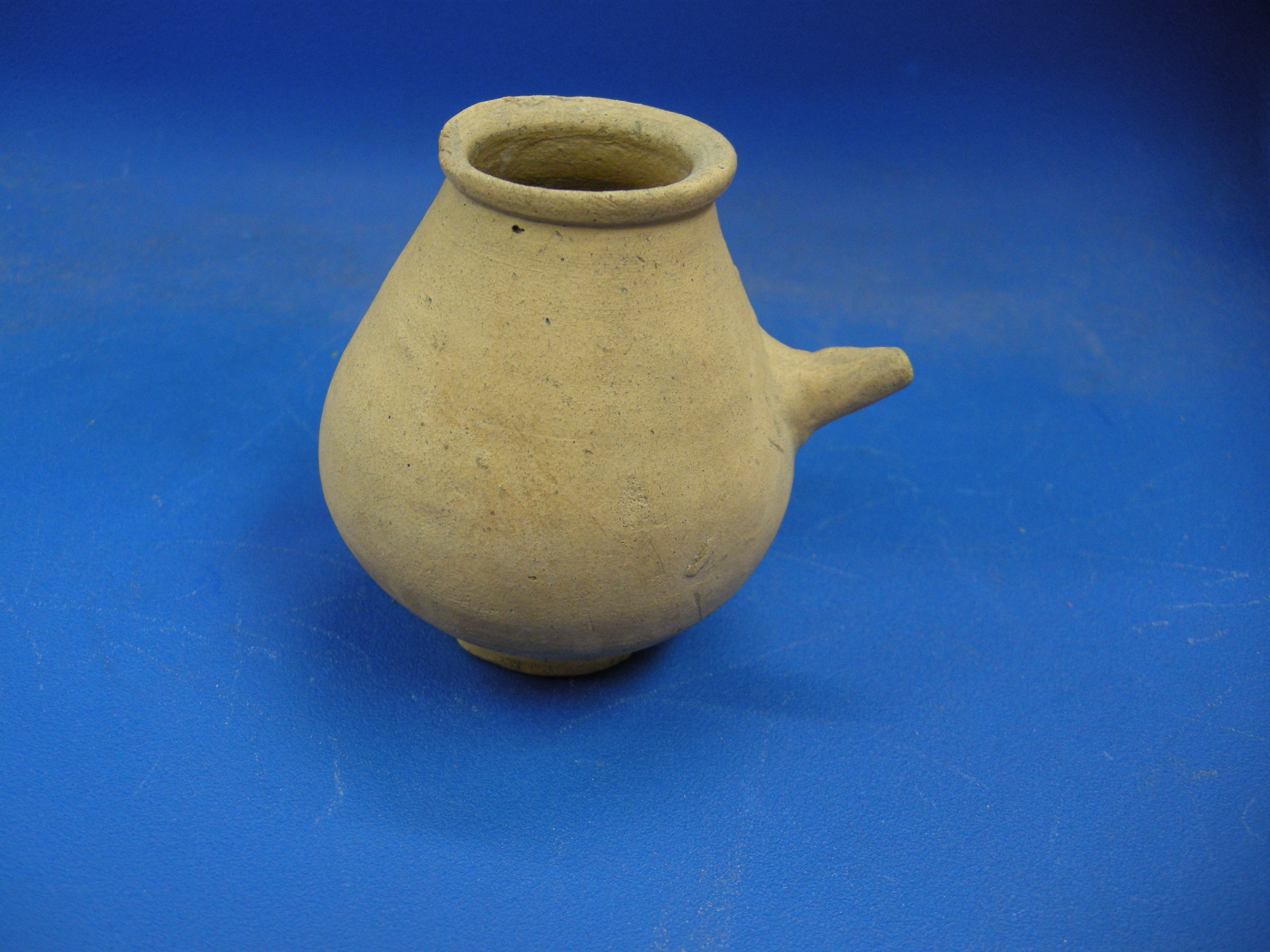
