= Sarah Jennings =

Sarah Jennings may refer to:

- Sarah Churchill, Duchess of Marlborough (1660–1744), née Jennings, English courtier and noblewoman
- Sarah Jennings (archaeologist) (1947–2009), British archaeologist
