= Ruth Young =

Ruth Young may refer to:

- Ruth Comfort Mitchell Young (1882–1954), American author and playwright
- Ruth Forbes Young (1903–1998), member of the Forbes family and philanthropist
- Ruth Young (labor union official) (1916–1986)
- Ruth Young (singer), American jazz singer
- Ruth Young (archaeologist), professor of archaeology at the University of Leicester
