= John Charles Tarver =

English physician (1790–1851)

- Born: 27 March 1790; Dieppe
- Died: 15 April 1851 (aged 61)
- Occupation: Author

John Charles Tarver (27 March 1790 – 15 April 1851) was an English educational writer.

== Biography ==
Tarver was the son of John Tarver of London, by his wife Sarah (Fox). He was born at Dieppe on 27 March 1790. Upon the outbreak of war with England in 1793, the Tarvers were thrown into prison, together with the other English residents. John was at that time staying in the house of M. Féral, a friend of his mother, and chief engineer of the ‘Ponts et Chaussées’ for Seine-Inférieure; and when the means of escape were offered to his parents, he was left in France until an opportunity should offer to send him to England. This never occurred. M. Féral, however, brought the child up as his own son, educated him, partly himself and partly at the government school at Pont Audemer, and in 1805 took him into his own employment in the service of the Ponts et Chaussées. Three years later he obtained him an appointment in the administration de la marine, in which service he remained, first as secretary to the admiral of the fleet at Toulon, and afterwards at Leghorn, Spezzia, Genoa, and Brest, until at the cessation of war in 1814 he was enabled to renew his intercourse with his family. In March of this year he obtained leave of absence and hastened to England, where he found his mother and a brother and sister living. He returned to Paris during the ‘hundred days,’ immediately after the flight of Louis XVIII, but, his prospects there appearing unsettled, he decided to rejoin his friends in England. He soon obtained a post as French master at Macclesfield free school. While there he was struck by the lack of guidance afforded by existing dictionaries as to the right word to choose when a number of equivalents were given. As a first attempt to remedy this defect he prepared his ‘Dictionnaire des Verbes Français’ (Macclesfield, 1818, 8vo); but this was avowedly incomplete, and he was ultimately led to produce, at the cost of immense labour, his valuable and original ‘Royal Phraseological English-French and French-English Dictionary’ (London, 1845, 2 vols. 4to; 2nd edit. 1849; 3rd edit. 1854). It was dedicated by permission to Prince Albert, and it became a standard work. The difficulties involved can be discerned by turning to a word like ‘get,’ for which, in five closely printed columns, some hundreds of equivalents are carefully differentiated.

In 1819, Tarver married his cousin, Mary Cristall. He was afterwards appointed French tutor to Prince George, duke of Cambridge, and went to live at Windsor. In 1826 he was appointed French master at Eton, and held that post for the remainder of his life. He issued for the use of his scholars ‘Familiar Conversational French Exercises,’ ‘Introduction à la Langue usuelle’ (1836), and other primers, from which was gradually evolved ‘The Eton French Grammar.’ He also revised several historical abridgments, French grammars, manuals, and dictionaries. His only other work of importance in addition to the ‘Phraseological Dictionary’ was a careful prose translation from Dante, ‘L'Inferno, en français’ (Paris, 1824, 8vo), with a volume of notes. He died at Windsor on 15 April 1851, having been a master at Eton for twenty-five years. Towards the end of this period had been associated with him in succession his sons, William Henry Tarver and Francis Batten Cristall Tarver, postmaster of Merton College (1848–52), who succeeded his father. The eldest son, Charles Féral, so named after his father's benefactor, a fellow of King's College, Cambridge, became tutor to the Prince of Wales, canon of Chester, and rector of Stisted; he died at Stisted rectory on 19 August 1886. The third son, Joseph Tarver, graduated from Worcester College, Oxford, in 1849, and was in 1850 presented to the rectory of Tyringham with Filgrave, Buckinghamshire.

The youngest son, Edward John Tarver (1841–1891), after education at Eton and at Bruce Castle, was articled in 1858 to Benjamin Ferrey, architect. After obtaining several prizes at the Institute and at the Architectural Association, he commenced work on his own account in 1863. His chief ecclesiastical work was the large octagonal church at Harlesden Green (1877–90), and his other works include a large country house for the Murrieta family at Wadhurst, Sussex, the rectory at Broadstairs (1870), and the Brixton Orphanage. He was president of the Architectural Association in 1874, and in 1888 issued his useful ‘Guide to the Study of the History of Architecture,’ being the substance of six courses of lectures on the subject. Tarver, who was an F.S.A. and a fellow of the Royal Institute of British Architects, died of pneumonia on 7 June 1891 (R.I.B.A. Journal, 11 June 1891).
