= Charles Shepard =

Charles Shepard may refer to:

- Charles Upham Shepard (1804–1886), American mineralogist and chemist
- Charles Biddle Shepard (1808–1843), congressional representative from North Carolina
- Charles E. Shepard (1901–1992), American politician and government official from Massachusetts
- Charles Shepard (artist) (1892–1962), English artist and sculptor
- Charles C. Shepard (1914–1985), American microbiologist
- Charlie Shepard (1933–2009), American player of Canadian football

== See also ==
- Charles Shepard Chapman (1879–1962), American painter
- Chuck Shepard, owner of Hoodoo ski area
- Charles Shepherd (disambiguation)
