= Vicki Cummings (archaeologist) =

British archaeologist

Vicki Cummings FSA

Academic background
- Education: Cardiff University (BA, MA, PhD)
- Thesis: (2001)
- Doctoral advisor: Alasdair Whittle

Academic work
- Discipline: Archaeology
- Institutions: Cardiff University; University of Central Lancashire

Vicki Cummings is an archaeologist at Cardiff University, specialising in the Neolithic of Britain and Ireland. She has worked at the University of Central Lancashire from 2004 to 2023, after which Cummings re-joined Cardiff University. Cummings has led research projects and excavations, exploring the architecture of chambered tombs in Wales, Scotland and Ireland. She was elected a Fellow of the Society of Antiquaries of London in 2013.

== Education ==
Cummings was educated at Cardiff University for her BA, MA, and PhD. She completed her PhD between 1997–2001. Her thesis was supervised by Alasdair Whittle.

== Career and research ==
Cummings' research focuses on the Neolithic of Britain and Ireland in a North-West European context, its development on monumentality, chambered tombs and burial practices, and the Mesolithic-Neolithic transition in North-West Europe. After completing her PhD, Cummings worked as a research assistant at both the Board of Celtic Studies and Cardiff University. Cummings was employed by University of Central Lancashire (UCLAN) in 2004. During her time at the university she established its archaeology degree.

In 2013, Cummings was elected a Fellow of the Society of Antiquaries of London. The same year, her book The Anthropology of Hunter-Gatherers: Key Themes for Archaeologists was published by Bloomsbury Academic; in it Cummings applied a post-processual theoretical approach to provide an overview of studies on hunter-gathers, and in a review in The Archaeological Journal Thomas Kador described it as "a simple access point to the vast body of anthropological literature on modern and recent hunter-gatherer communities".

Cummings was appointed a personal chair in 2018, and was UCLAN's first Professor for Archaeology. Cummings collaborated with Colin Richards on a study of dolmens, a type of megalithic structure, and challenging existing ideas of typology; the results were published by Oxbow Books in 2021 as a monograph titled Monuments in the Making: raising the great dolmens in early Neolithic northern Europe. The research was nominated for Research Project in the 2023 Current Archaeology Awards. Cummings has directed multi-year excavations at a Neolithic chambered tomb in Sanday, Orkney.

In 2023, Cummings took up employment at Cardiff University as a professor and Head of the School of History, Archaeology and Religion. That year she led an excavation at a Neolithic tomb in Holm with Hugo Anderson-Whymark. Her 2024 book, Stone Circles: A Field Guide co-written with Colin Richards, was nominated for Book of the Year in the 2025 Current Archaeology Awards.

Cummings is the Co-Chair of University Archaeology UK, an organisation which represents institutions offering Archaeology degrees within the UK. She has appeared on public venues such as the BBC's In Our Time and the "Country Life Podcast" talking about prehistoric archaeology.

== Selected publications ==
=== Sole author ===
- Cummings, V. 2017. The Neolithic of Britain and Ireland. Routledge Archaeology of Northern Europe. London: Routledge.
- Cummings, V. 2013. The Anthropology of Hunter-Gatherers: Key Themes for Archaeologists. Debates in Archaeology. London: Bloomsbury Academic.

=== Co-author ===
- Richards, C. and Cummings, V. 2024. Stone Circles: A Field Guide. Yale University Press.
- Cummings, V. and Richards, C. 2021. Monuments in the Making: raising the great dolmens in early Neolithic northern Europe. Oxbow Books.

=== Articles ===
- Cummings, V. and Fowler, C. 2023. Materialising descent: lineage formation in early Neolithic southern Britain.. Proceedings of the Prehistoric Society, pp. 1–21 (doi:10.1017/ppr.2023.2)
- Cummings, V., Hofmann, D., Bjornevad-Ahlqvist, M. and Iversen, R. 2022. Muddying the waters: reconsidering migration in the Neolithic of Britain, Ireland and Denmark. Danish Journal of Archaeology 11, pp. 1–25. (doi:10.7146/dja.v11i.129698)
- Fowler, C. et al. 2022. A high-resolution picture of kinship practices in an Early Neolithic tomb. Nature 601(7894), pp. 584–587. (doi:10.1038/s41586-021-04241-4)
