= Kate Clark (archaeologist) =

Archaeologist

Kate Clark FSA
- Website: www.linkedin.com/in/kate-c-062b4345/

Kate Clark is an industrial archaeologist who has worked in museums and heritage in Australia and the UK. She has a special interest in concepts of value and heritage and has published widely on industrial archaeology, heritage and sustainable development, buildings archaeology, cultural landscapes, and public policy for heritage. She introduced to the UK the idea of values based thinking and prior understanding (informed conservation) in the conservation of landscapes, buildings and sites.

== Education ==
She was educated at the University of Cambridge where she graduated with an MA in Archaeology and Anthropology in 1981.

== Career and research ==
Clark FSA FRGS is a museum director and archaeologist. She was elected a Fellow of the Society of Antiquaries of London in 2000. Clark was Director of Sydney Living Museums between 2008 and 2013 and the CEO of Cadw from 2014. Before that, she also worked for English Heritage, the Heritage Lottery Fund, the Council for British Archaeology, and the Ironbridge Gorge Museum.

== Selected publications ==
Clark and Judith Alfrey co-wrote The landscape of industry: patterns of change in the Ironbridge Gorge, a book published in 1993 which studied the landscape of the Ironbridge Gorge to enhance the understanding of its past. It was part of a pattern of landscape studies around this time.

- Clark, Kate (1987). "Trouble at t'mill: industrial archaeology in the 1980s". Antiquity. 61 (232): 169–179. doi:10.1017/s0003598x00051978.
- Clark, Kate (1993). Book of Ironbridge Gorge. English Heritage. London: Batsford. ISBN 978-0-7134-6737-6.
- Alfrey, Judith; Clark, Kate (1993). The landscape of industry: patterns of change in the Ironbridge Gorge. London: Routledge. ISBN 978-0-415-03319-0.
- Clark, Kate, ed. (1999). Conservation plans in action: proceedings of the Oxford conference. London: English Heritage. ISBN 978-1-85074-752-9.
- Clark, Kate (2001). "Planning for the past: Heritage services in local planning authorities in England". Cultural Trends. 11 (43–44): 61–94. doi:10.1080/09548960109365166.
- Clark, Kate (2019). "Power of Place - Heritage Policy at the Start of the New Millennium". The Historic Environment: Policy & Practice. 10 (3–4): 255–281. doi:10.1080/17567505.2019.1696549.
