= Sara Perry =

British archaeologist

Sara Perry FSA

Academic background
- Education: University of Southampton
- Thesis: The archaeological eye: visualisation and the institutionalisation of academic archaeology in London (2011)
- Doctoral advisor: Stephanie Moser

Academic work
- Discipline: Archaeology
- Sub-discipline: Public archaeology Digital archaeology
- Institutions: University of York; Museum of London Archaeology

Sara Perry FSA is an archaeologist. Her research focuses on public archaeology and the use of digital media in archaeology and heritage. She is the Director of Research and Engagement at Museum of London Archaeology.

== Biography ==
Perry has a BA and MA in Anthropology from the University of Victoria. She completed her PhD in 2011 at the University of Southampton, supervised by Stephanie Moser, with a thesis titled: "The archaeological eye: visualisation and the institutionalisation of academic archaeology in London".

Perry spent eight years teaching at the University of York. She held the role of Senior Lecturer in Cultural Heritage Management in November 2019 when she left the University to join MOLA. She is the head of Visualisation at the Neolithic site of Çatalhöyük.

In 2015 Perry was named as one of the Jisc '50 most influential UK higher education professionals on social media'. In 2016 she was nominated for the Times Higher Education Award for Most Innovative Teacher of the Year, as well as being awarded a Vice-Chancellor's Teaching Award from the University of York. Perry was elected as a Fellow of the Society of Antiquaries of London on 25 March 2021.

== Select publications ==
- Perry, Sara, 2019. "The Enchantment of the Archaeological Record". European Journal of Archaeology 22(3), 354–371. doi:10.1017/eaa.2019.24
- Perry, Sara, Roussou, Maria, Mirashrafi, Sophia S., Katifori, A., and McKinney, Sierra, 2019. "Shared Digital Experiences Supporting Collaborative Meaning-Making at Heritage Sites". In Hannah Lewi, Wally Smith, Dirk vom Lehn, Steven Cooke (eds.), The Routledge International Handbook of New Digital Practices in Galleries, Libraries, Archives, Museums and Heritage Sites. London: Routledge. 143–156.
- Perry, Sara, 2018. Why are Heritage Interpreters Voiceless at the Trowel's Edge? A Plea for Rewriting the Archaeological Workflow. Advances in Archaeological Practice 6(3), 212–227. doi:10.1017/aap.2018.21
- Perry, Sara, 2017. "Archaeology on television, 1937". Public Archaeology 16(1), 3-18.
- Perry, Sara, 2014. "Professionalization: Archaeology as an ‘Expert’ Knowledge". In C. Smith (ed.), Encyclopedia of Global Archaeology. Springer. 6150–6159.
