= Kim Woods =

British Archaeologist

Kim Wilford Woods FSA

Academic background
- Education: Courtauld Institute

Academic work
- Discipline: Art history
- Sub-discipline: Medieval alabaster
- Institutions: Open University

Kim Wilford Woods FSA is an art historian specialising in northern European late Gothic sculpture and is Senior Lecturer in art history at the Open University.

== Career ==
Woods has a bachelor's degree in history from the University of York. She gained her PhD in art history in 1988 from the Courtauld Institute, University of London with a thesis titled 'Netherlandish Carved Wooden Altarpieces of the 15th and early 16th centuries in Britain'. She joined the Open University in 1999. She was elected as a Fellow of the Society of Antiquaries of London on 11 November 2005.

== Select publications ==
- Woods, K. W. 2017. 'The tree of Jesse gates from Scarisbrick Hall', in Davies, G. and Townsend, E. (eds.) A Reservoir of Ideas: Essays in honour of Paul Williamson. London, Paul Holberton/V&A publishing. 235–244.
- Woods, K. W. 2017 'The activation of the image: expatriate carvers and kneeling effigies in late Gothic Spain', The Sculpture Journal 26/1, 11–23.
- Woods, K. W. 2016. Cut in Alabaster: a material of sculpture and its European traditions 1330-1530. Harvey Miller.
- Woods, K. W. 2016. 'Plantagenets in alabaster', Crooks, P., Green, D. and Ormorod, M. (eds) The Plantagenet Empire, 1259–1453. Shaun Tyas. 89–108.
- Woods, K. W. 2014. 'Altarpieces in Alabaster' in Fajt, J. and Hörsch, M. (eds) Niederländische Skulpturenexporte nach Nord- und Ostmitteleuropa vom 14. bis 16. Jahrhundert (Studia Jagellonica Lipsiensia). Ostfildern. 41–58.
- Woods, K. W. 2013. 'The Master of Rimini and the tradition of alabaster carving in the early 15th century Netherlands' Meaning in Materials 1400-1800, Nederlands Kunsthistorisch Jaarboek 62. 56–83.
- Woods, K. W. 2007. Imported images: Netherlandish Late Gothic Sculpture in England, C.1400-c.1550. Shaun Tyas.
