= Kay Hartley =

English archaeologist (1929–2025)

Kay Hartley FSA
- Born: Katharine Freda Kaine; 2 August 1929; Burnley, England
- Died: 22 May 2025 (aged 95); Leeds, England
- Occupation: Archaeologist
- Spouse: Brian Hartley (m. 1955; div. 1973)

Academic background
- Education: University of London; University of Leicester

Academic work
- Discipline: Archaeology
- Sub-discipline: Roman pottery

Kay Hartley FSA (born Katharine Freda Kaine; 2 August 1929 – 22 May 2025) was an English archaeologist and specialist in the study of Romano-British mortaria.

== Early life ==
Katharine Freda Kaine was born in 1929 in Burnley in Lancashire, the second of four children. She was brought up in Gisburn Toll Bar, then in the county of Yorkshire, by an aunt and uncle. She won a scholarship to Burnley Girls' High School in 1939. Then she went to Burnley Municipal College where she studied for an external degree of London University and graduated in 1950 with an honours degree in history.

She then went to Leicester University College to study for a Diploma in Education and then taught for several years. Hartley had an interest in archaeology from childhood, but had no way of furthering her interest until she moved to Saddleworth after taking her degree, where the Workers' Educational Association began a series of lectures on archaeology in the nearby village of Uppermill. She also attended the excavation at Great Casterton organised by Maurice Barley. It was there she met Brian Hartley, whom she married in 1955.

== Work on mortaria ==
Professor Eric Birley encouraged her study of stamps on amphora and mortaria, and she planned to study for a PhD on mortaria stamps. She abandoned this plan because funding was withdrawn when she married, but she planned to publish all her notes and drawings on stamped mortaria. This archive was later digitised and made available online.

Hartley contributed specialist reports on mortaria to many publications of archaeological sites, such as Verulamium (St Albans), Richborough, and many sites in the Nene Valley and in Yorkshire.

During the late 1960s and early 1970s, Kay Hartley conducted excavations at Mancetter and at Hartshill in Warwickshire, a major production site of mortaria. She continued to work on mortaria reports until the end of her life.

== Honours and awards ==
In December 2023, Newcastle University awarded Hartley an honorary Doctor of Letters. A Festschrift in her honour was published by the Study Group for Roman Pottery in 2005. In 1972, she was elected as a Fellow of the Society of Antiquaries of London.

== Personal life ==
Kaine married Brian Hartley in 1955. They separated in 1971, and the marriage was dissolved in 1973. Hartley died on 22 May 2025 in Leeds.
