= The Stonemason ostracon =

The Stonemason Ostracon is a figured-limestone ostracon from the Ramesside period of Ancient Egypt, 19–20th Dynasties.

The figured-ostracon is made in outline form with black and (faint)-red paint-(ink). It is a sketchpad ostracon, as sections of red lines remain unfilled, as well as finalized black lines show adjacent to the faint reds. Minor sections of a red frame line remain.

The unflattering figured-character of the stonemason is bald, paunched, with facial stubble, in a leaning-over, and awkward pose. It is a caricature scene, as in a cartoon. The Stonemason is holding his chisel in his left hand and his wooden Egyptian mallet in his right hand.

== Ostracon reverse ==
While the obverse has the Stonemason, the reverse tells an entirely different story. A register of hieroglyphs is across the bottom of the ostracon, below a drawing of the snake, Meretseger; apparently, the ostracon was once larger, because a seated person (only the knees visible), but outstretched arms (hands) in adoration, are before the snake goddess Meretseger. (See hieroglyph: man-seated: arms in adoration (hieroglyph)) More hieroglyphs are at the upper region of the picture, but the ostracon has discoloration that obscures it.
