= David Wigg-Wolf =

British numismatist

David Wigg-Wolf FSA
- Born: 1956 (age 69–70)
- Title: Honorary Professor

Academic background
- Education: Oriel College, Oxford University of Oxford
- Thesis: The Circulation of Bronze Coinage in N. Gaul in the Mid-fourth Century A.D.: the Numismatic Evidence for the Usurpation of Magnentius and its Aftermath (1986)

Academic work
- Discipline: Numismatics
- Institutions: Academy of Sciences and Literature; German Archaeological Institute; University of Leicester

David Wigg-Wolf (born 1956), also known as David G. Wigg is a British-German numismatist.

== Education ==
Wigg-Wolf completed his Master of Arts in Literae Humaniores in 1979 at Oriel College, Oxford University. Supervised by Cathy E. King, Heberden Coin Room at the Ashmolean Museum, Wigg-Wolf received his doctorate from the University of Oxford in 1986 with his thesis on "The Circulation of Bronze Coinage in N. Gaul in the Mid-fourth Century A.D.: the Numismatic Evidence for the Usurpation of Magnentius and its Aftermath" From 1982 to 1984, he went to the Goethe University in Frankfurt am Main on the Michael Foster Memorial Scholarship, an exchange program of the German Academic Exchange Service and the University of Oxford.

== Career ==
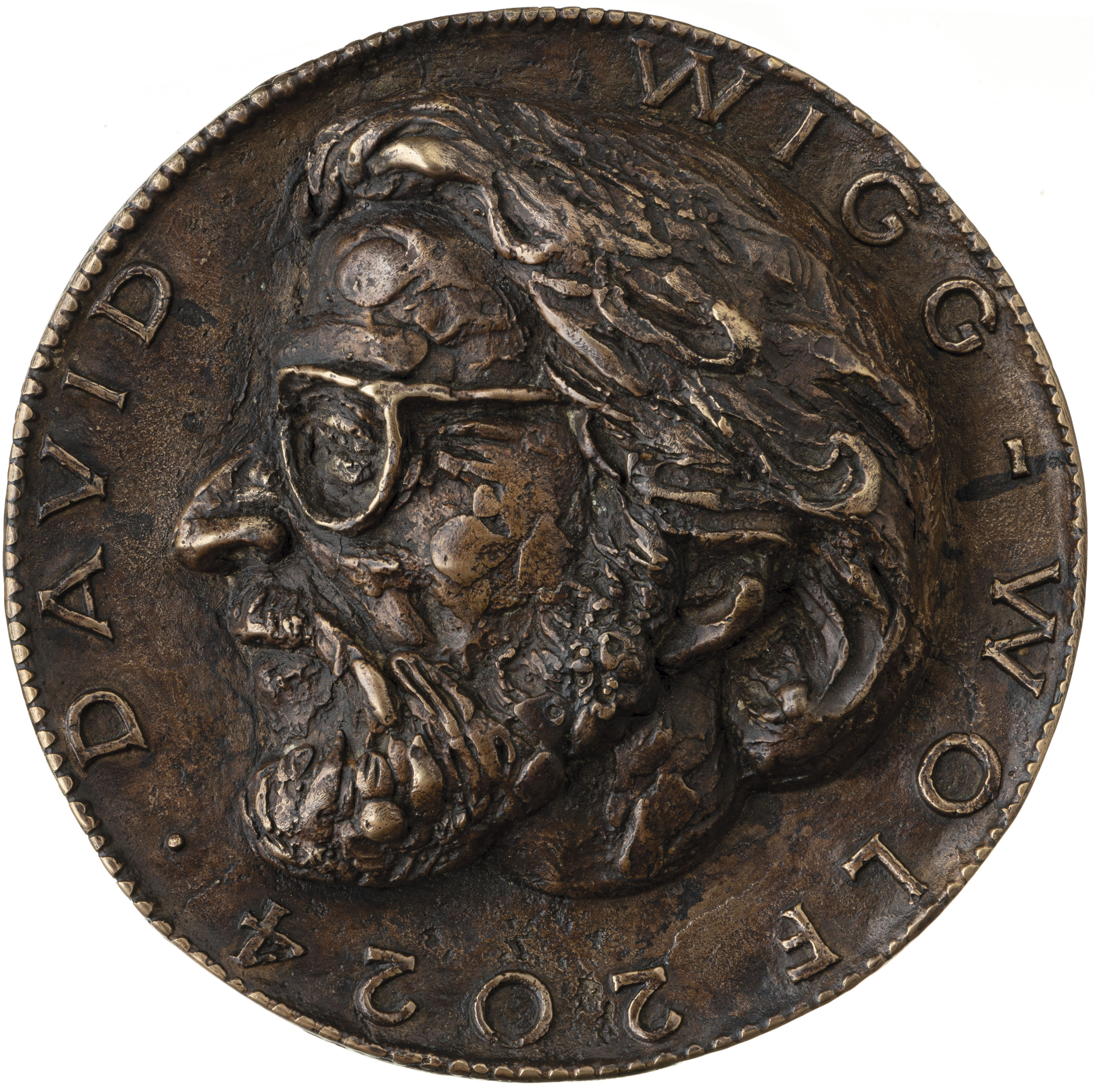
Obverse of the medal for David Wigg-Wolf, designed and cast by Rossen Andreev. Specimen from the Münzkabinett Berlin, object number 18314264.

From 1984, he worked as a researcher on the project "Fundmünzen der römischen Zeit in Deutschland" (FMRD), financed by the German Research Foundation, which was then transformed in 1986 into the academy project "Fundmünzen der Antike" (FRMD/SFMA) at the Academy of Sciences and Literature in Mainz. From December 2008 until his retirement in September 2024, he was a senior researcher at the Römisch-Germanische Kommission of the German Archaeological Institute.

Since September 2024, Wigg-Wolf has held the position of Editor-at-Large at British Archaeological Reports (BAR), a publisher specializing in archaeological works. Since December 2024, Wigg-Wolf has been an Honorary Professor at the University of Leicester in the School of Archaeology and Ancient History.

His research focuses in particular on Celtic coinage in Western Europe as well as the coinage of the Roman Empire and the Migration Period in Northern and Central Europe. The importance of coin finds for the understanding of the ancient world is always emphasized, whereby numismatic findings are closely linked to archaeological results.

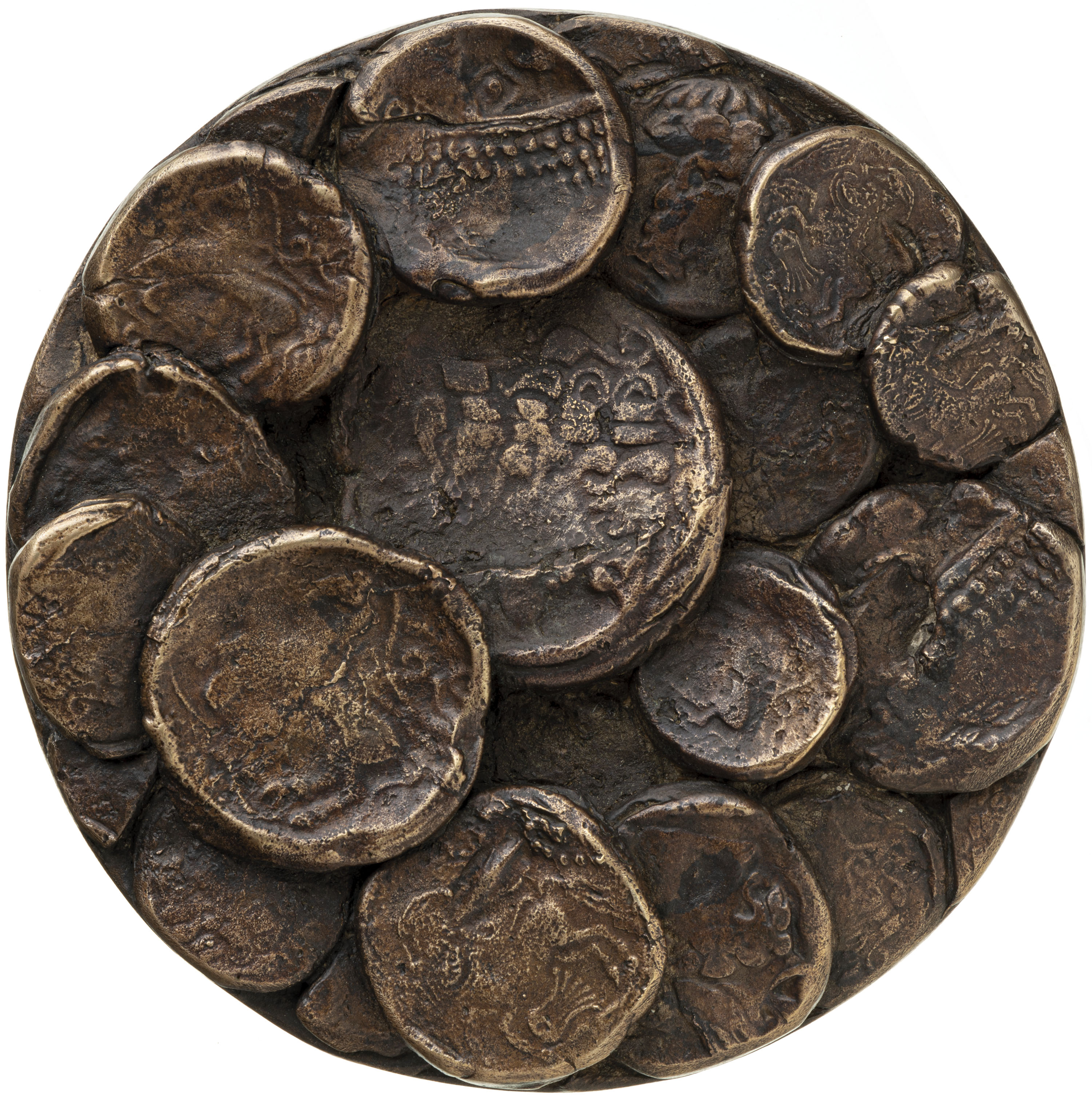
The reverse of the medal depicts Celtic coins in enlarged form, arranged one above the other and next to each other in great detail and plasticity.

Wigg-Wolf is also specialized in digital numismatics, having played a decisive role in shaping computer-aided research in this field. Together with the Big Data Lab at the University of Frankfurt, he developed the database "Antike Fundmünzen in Europa (AFE-RGK)", which is used by the Romano-Germanic Commission of the German Archaeological Institute, the University of Warsaw, the University of Heidelberg and the Eötvös Loránd University in Budapest. With AFE, coin find data is made available online and linked to other systems.

Since 2011 he has been working closely with the Linked Open Data project of the American Numismatic Society (ANS), nomisma.org, which was initiated by Andrew Meadows and Sebastian Heath and is now being further developed by Ethan Gruber, and is now a member of the nomisma.org Scientific Committee.

As co-chair of the DARIAH-EU Digital Numismatics Working Group and initiator of the European Coin Find Network (ECFN), he promoted cooperation and dialog between institutions that are particularly concerned with digital aspects of coin finds.

== Awards and honors ==
- 2003 Fellow of the Society of Antiquaries of London
- 2024 Retirement medal donated by colleagues and friends
- 2024 Honorary Professor at the University of Leicester

== Publications ==
By Wigg-Wolf

- Münzumlauf in Nordgallien um die Mitte des 4. Jahrhunderts n. Chr. Numismatische Zeugnisse für die Usurpation des Magnentius und die damit verbundenen Germaneneinfälle (= Studien zu Fundmünzen der Antike 8). Gebr. Mann, Berlin 1991, ISBN 3-7861-1595-8 (PhD).
- with Cathy E. King (Hrsg.): Coin Finds and Coin Use in the Roman World. The Thirteenth Oxford Symposium of Coinage and Monetary History, 25–27 March 1993 (= Studien zu Fundmünzen der Antike 10). Gebr. Mann, Berlin 1996.
- with Jeannot Metzler (Hrsg.): Die Kelten und Rom. Neue numismatische Forschungen (= Studien zu Fundmünzen der Antike 19). Zabern, Mainz 2005, ISBN 3-8053-3577-6.
- with Colin Haselgrove (Hrsg.): Iron age coinage and ritual practices (= Studien zu Fundmünzen der Antike 20). Zabern, Mainz 2005, ISBN 3-8053-3491-5.
- with Claudia Nickel, Martin Thoma: Martberg: Heiligtum und Oppidum der Treverer (= Berichte zur Archäologie an Mittelrhein und Mosel Bd. 14). Koblenz 2008.
- Die Fundmünzen der römischen Zeit in Deutschland, Abteilung 4, Rheinland-Pfalz. Band 4, 2: Koblenz: der Martberg bei Pommern (ehem. Kreis Cochem) II. Gebr. Mann, Berlin 2015.
- with Thomas G. Schattner, Dieter Vieweger (Hrsg.): Kontinuität und Diskontinuität, Prozesse der Romanisierung. Fallstudien zwischen Iberischer Halbinsel und Vorderem Orient. Ergebnisse der gemeinsamen Treffen der Arbeitsgruppen >Kontinuität und Diskontinuität: Lokale Traditionen und römische Herrschaft im Wandel, und, Geld eint, Geld trennt< (2013–2017). Verlag Marie Leidorf, Rahden/Westf. 2019, ISBN 978-3-86757-397-9.

About Wigg-Wolf

- Pilekić, M. (2024) „Honos in aere signatus – David Wigg-Wolf geht in den Ruhestand", Geldgeschichtliche Nachrichten (GN). Gesellschaft für Internationale Geldgeschichte (GIG). doi: 10.5281/zenodo.13626770.
