= Charles Shepherd =

Charles Shepherd may refer to:

- Charles Shepherd (photographer) (died 1878), British photographer
- Charles Shepherd (boxer) (born 1970), former British, Commonwealth and World Super Featherweight boxing champion
- Charles Shepherd (field hockey) (1887–1968), Welsh field hockey player
- Charlie Shepherd, American politician, member of the Idaho House of Representatives
- Chuck Shepherd, editor of News of the Weird

== See also ==
- Charles Shepard (disambiguation)
- Chaz Lamar Shepherd, American actor and singer-songwriter
