= Gail Falkingham =

British archaeologist

Gail Falkingham FSA MCIFA
- Occupations: Archaeologist; Curator; Archivist

Academic work
- Discipline: Archaeology

Gail Falkingham FSA MCIfA is a British archaeologist, archivist, and curator.

== Biography ==
Falkingham worked for North Yorkshire County Council as County Archaeologist and is currently employed by the Yorkshire Museum as Assistant Curator of Archaeological Archives. She is also an archivist for the North Yorkshire County Record Office.

Falkingham is a trustee of the Yorkshire Gardens Trust. Gail was elected as a fellow of the Society of Antiquaries of London on 29 October 2020.

== Select publications ==
- Falkingham, G. 2000. 'A Roman Burial from Catterick Bridge, North Yorkshire.' Yorkshire Archaeological Society Roman Antiquities Section Bulletin, 17, pp. 32–33.
- Falkingham, G. 2003. 'Review of Discovering Craven, Richard Harland Collection and Craven Museum Lithics Collections', Internet Archaeology 14. doi:10.11141/ia.14.9
- Falkingham, G. 2005. 'A Whiter Shade of Grey: A new approach to archaeological grey literature using the XML version of the TEI Guidelines', Internet Archaeology 17. doi:10.11141/ia.17.5
- Falkingham, G. 2019. 'Inspiration and Planning: What future for our historic parks and gardens?', The Gardens Trust - GT News 10 (Summer 2019). 12–17.
