= Stephanie Moser =

British archaeologist

Stephanie Moser is an Australian archaeologist and academic. She is a professor at the University of Southampton, England. Her work explores the exhibition and reception of the human past. Moser's research examines visual images from antiquity through the lens of modern anthropology.

== Education ==
Her B.A. was completed in 1989 at La Trobe University, Melbourne. In 1995, Moser was awarded a Ph.D in archaeology from the University of Sydney, with a thesis is entitled Archaeology and its disciplinary culture: The Professionalisation of Australian Archaeology.

== Career ==
Since 1995, Moser has been a professor of archaeology at the University of Southampton, England. Moser is a member of the Society of Antiquaries of London. She served as Council Member for the Society of Antiquaries from 2013 to 2016, and is a member of the Antiquity Trust, which supports the publication of the archaeology journal Antiquity.

== Research ==
For her thesis, Archaeology and its Disciplinary Culture: The Professionalization of Australia's Prehistoric Archaeology, Moser describes how professional archaeologists used their newfound methods and culture to exclude amateurs from their trade. Archaeologists, according to Moser's thesis, need to go into "the field" to become "real" archaeologists.

Establishing archaeological representation as a research field within anthropology was Moser's first major research enterprise. For "The visual language of archaeology: a case study of the Neanderthals," she investigated how one artist's depiction of Homo sapiens Neanderthalensis single-handedly forged our modern impression of the species.

Since the late 1990s Moser has investigated how Ancient Egypt has been represented in 19th century England. In addition to this, in 2002, she published a paper on how to collaborate with indigenous populations in the presentation of their cultural heritage. In "Transforming Archaeology Through Practice: Strategies for Collaborative Archaeology and the Community at Quseir, Egypt," Moser and her colleagues outlined inclusive methods archaeologists should adopt when investigating people's heritage. The basis of the paper stemmed from Moser's training in Australia which involved working with Australia's indigenous people.

Moser's other research deals with how the mechanisms of museum displays contribute to knowledge. She addresses the interplay of exhibition analysis, art collecting, and archaeological representation.

In 2019, Moser was investigating the roots of archaeological illustration at the Society of Antiquaries of London and how it was used to facilitate their research ventures. Moser was also researching Egyptologist and artist Joseph Bonomi and the ways he contributed to the understanding of ancient Egypt.
