= Charles Bernard Sheppard =

American politician and lawyer

Charles Bernard Sheppard is a lawyer, former state legislator, and professor in Mississippi. He represented District 85 in the Mississippi House of Representatives.

He is married and has two sons. In 2004 governor Ronnie Musgrove appointed him to the state ethics commission.
