= William Cowper (doctor) =

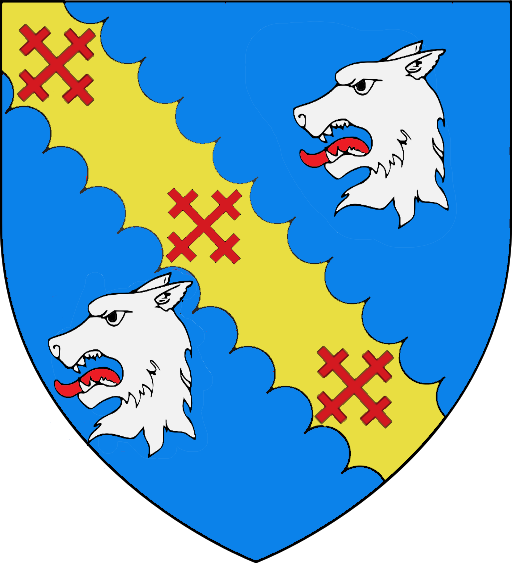
- Arms of Cowper: Azure, on a bend engrailed, Or, between two wolf's heads erased, Argent, three cross crosslets, Gules
- Born: Overleigh Hall, Cheshire
- Baptised: 29 July 1701
- Died: 12 October 1767 (aged 66); Overleigh Hall, Cheshire
- Resting place: St Peter's Church, Chester; 53.1904°N 2.8918°W
- Education: St Mary Hall, Oxford; Brasenose College, Oxford
- Occupations: Physician; Antiquarian
- Office: Mayor of Chester
- Term: 1754–1755
- Predecessor: Edmund Bolland
- Successor: John Page
- Spouse: Elizabeth Lonsdale
- Parents: John Cowper; Catherine Sherwin

William Cowper FSA (baptised 29 July 1701 – 12 October 1767) of Overleigh Hall, Cheshire, was a British physician and antiquarian.

== Life ==
Cowper was the third son of the Reverend John Cowper (1671–1718), MA of Overleigh Hall, Cheshire, and Catherine, daughter of William Sherwin, beadle of divinity and bailiff of the University of Oxford. He was baptised on 29 July 1701 at St Peter's Church, Chester.

He matriculated from St Mary Hall, Oxford on 24 October 1714 and subsequently attended Brasenose College as a resident commoner from January 1717 to December 1718, although a manuscript biography among his papers claims he studied at Brasenose for four years. After leaving Oxford he studied medicine in Paris and London and it is very probable that he was awarded his medical degree in Paris. In 1754 he was elected mayor of Chester.

He was elected a fellow of the Society of Antiquaries of London. He published anonymously A Summary of the Life of St. Werburgh, with an historical account of the images upon her shrine (now the episcopal throne) in the choir of Chester. Collected from antient chronicles and old writers, by a Citizen of Chester, Chester, 1749. This work is said to have been stolen from the manuscripts of Mr. Stone. He was also the author of Il Penseroso: an evening's contemplation in St. John's churchyard, Chester. A rhapsody, written more than twenty years ago, and now (first) published, illustrated with notes historical and explanatory, London, 1767, addressed, under the name of M. Meanwell, to the Rev. John Allen, M.A., senior fellow of Trinity College, Cambridge, and rector of Tarporley, Cheshire. In this work Cowper takes a view of some of the most remarkable places around Chester distinguished by memorable personages and events.

He was an intelligent antiquarian and preserved many valuable manuscript collections of Williamson and others which would otherwise have perished. He also left several works of his own compilation relative to the ancient history of Cheshire and Chester. These manuscripts, which are frequently quoted by George Ormerod, the Cheshire historian, are preserved in the family archives at Overleigh. They consist of various small volumes, most of the contents of which are fairly transcribed into two larger ones, containing memoirs of the earls of the palatinate and the bishops and dignitaries of the cathedral, lists of city and county officers, and a local chronology of events. In his Broxton MSS he takes William Webbe's Itinerary as the text of each township, adds an account of it transcribed from Edward Williamson's Villare Cestriense, and continues the descent of property to his own time. He also wrote a small manuscript volume, entitled Parentalia, containing memoirs of the Cowper family, and the account of the siege of Chester, which is printed in Ormerod's Cheshire, vol. 1, pp. 203 etc. This description of the siege had been printed twice previously at Chester (in 1790 and 1793), but with considerable alterations.

Cowper was a guardian of the Foundling Hospital in London.

== Overleigh Hall ==
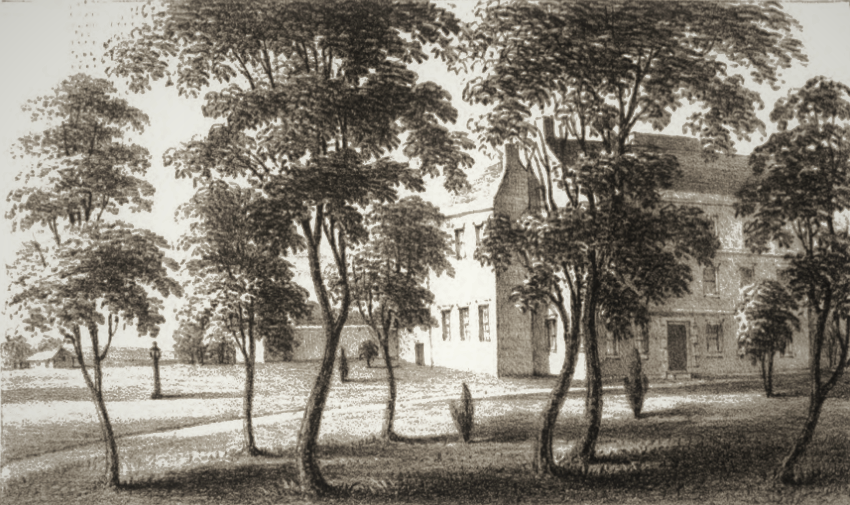
Overleigh Hall, Chester

The Hall, to the west of what is now the modern district of Handbridge, was built by Thomas Cowper (d. 1695), who had acquired the estate partly through descent and partly through purchase. William Cowper made improvements to the property, which in 1811 was inherited by Charles Cholmondeley (1770–1846), third son of Thomas Cholmondeley of Vale Royal Abbey and rented to a tenant. In 1821, along with 135 acres (55 ha) of land, it was bought by Robert Grosvenor, 1st Marquess of Westminster and demolished in 1830 to allow construction of a new entrance to the Eaton Hall estate.

== Personal life and death ==
Cowper married Elizabeth, daughter of John Lonsdale of High Ryley, Lancashire, in 1722, but had no issue. He died at Overleigh on 12 October 1767, and was buried at St. Peter's Church, Chester.
