= Helen Wyld =

British museum curator

Helen Wyld is a British museum curator. She is the senior curator of historic textiles at National Museums Scotland. She was elected as fellow of the Society of Antiquaries of London on 22 February 2024 and is also a fellow of the Society of Antiquaries of Scotland.

== Select publications ==
- Wyld, H. 2012. "Mortlake's Bouquet of the Senses: The Five Senses Tapestries at Haddon Hall", Apollo, 175.
- Wyld, H. 2016. "Bess of Hardwick's Tapestries", in Adshead, D. and Taylor, DA.H.B. (ed) Hardwick Hall: A Great Old Castle of Romance. Yale.
- Wyld, H. 2018. Embroidered Stories: Scottish Samplers. National Museums Scotland.
- Wyld, H. 2022. The Art of Tapestry. Bloomsbury.
- Wyld, H. 2024. "The Mystery of the Fettercairn Jewel", in Groundwater, A. (ed) Decoding the Jewels: Renaissance Jewellery in Scotland.
