= Donald Henson =

British archaeologist and prehistorian (1956–2021)

Donald Henson FSA FHEA MCIfA
- Born: 9 May 1956; Chester, England
- Died: April 11, 2021 (aged 64)
- Other names: Gwyn Jones; Don Henson

Academic background
- Education: University of York
- Thesis: The Meso-what? The public perceptions of the Mesolithic. (2016)
- Doctoral advisor: Nicky Milner

Academic work
- Discipline: Archaeology, Prehistory
- Sub-discipline: Public archaeology
- Institutions: Wakefield Museum; Council for British Archaeology; University of York

Donald "Don" Henson FSA FHEA MCIfA (9 May 1956 - 11 April 2021) was a British archaeologist and prehistorian, specialising in public archaeology.

== Biography ==
=== Early life ===
Henson was born Gwyn Jones in Chester to a Welsh mother and an American father. He was subsequently adopted by Sydney and Blanch Smith, renamed, and moved to Preston. After his adopted father's death and Blanche's remarriage, Don took his stepfather's surname. Henson attributed an early love for archaeology to the tv show Animal, Vegetable, Mineral?.

=== Education and working life ===
Henson went to school at Cefn Hengoed, Swansea. Henson studied for a BA in archaeology at University of Sheffield, specialising in prehistory. He described starting there in 1975 as the place where he learned that “being an archaeologist isn’t a profession; it’s a way of being, thinking and behaving”. He studied for a MPhil, researching the sources of flint and chert in Britain. Henson worked as an outreach officer for Wakefield Museum from 1988 to 1994 and then as Head of Education at the Council for British Archaeology from 1994 to 2011. Whilst at the CBA Henson was responsible for the Young Archaeologist's Club. In 2016 he completed his PhD in Archaeology at York on "The public perceptions of the Mesolithic"; it had been supported by research grants from the European Research Council and the Arts and Humanities Research Council.

He was subsequently appointed lecturer at the University of York. Henson was also an Honorary Lecturer at University College London. Henson served as the Chair of the World Archaeological Congress Public Education Committee.

He was elected as a fellow of the Society of Antiquaries of London on 5 May 2004. He was also a fellow of the Higher Education Academy. He was a trustee of the Yorkshire Dales Landscape Research Trust.

== Select publications ==
- Henson, D. & Milner, N. 2018. 'Chapter 13: Engaging a wider audience', in Milner, N, Conneller, C and Taylor, B (eds.) Star Carr, Volume 1: a persistent place in a changing world, White Rose University Press: York. 331-338.
- Henson, D. 2017. ‘Archaeology and education’, in G Moshenska (ed.) Key concepts in public archaeology, London: University College London Press. 43-59.
- Henson, D. 2013. ‘Romanes eunt domus?’, in N Mills (ed.) Presenting the Romans: interpreting the frontiers of the Roman Empire World Heritage Site, Woodbridge: The Boydell Press. 139-146.
- Henson, D. 2012. Doing Archaeology, A Subject Guide for Students, London: Routledge. ISBN 9780415602129
- Henson, D., A. Bodley, & M. Heyworth. 2006. 'The educational value of archaeology', in J-C Marquet, C Pathy-Barker & C Cohen, Archaeology and Education: from primary school to university ( British Archaeological Reports International Series 1505). Archaeopress, Oxford.
- Henson, D. 2000. “Archaeology in Higher Education”, The Archaeologist 37, 19-20.
- Henson, D., Hall, M., & Judkins, P. 1993. “Community education: the evening class experience”, Journal of Education in Museums 14, 1-2.
