= Charles Sandys =

English antiquarian and archeologist

Charles Sandys FSA (1786–1858) was an English antiquarian and solicitor. He was an early member of the British Archaeological Association and fellow of the Society of Antiquaries. He composed several works on the history of his home county, Kent, and the Canterbury Cathedral, including: a criticism of Robert Willis' history of the cathedral, a petition of the cathedral's lay clerks for higher wages, and a history of Kentish customs.

== Early life and family ==
Charles Sandys was born on 26 October 1786 to Canterbury solicitor Edwin Humphrey Sandys and his second wife, Helen. His father was a member of the Sandys family, which traced its lineage back to Edwin Sandys, Archbishop of York (1576–1588). His mother was the heiress of Edward Lord Chick, merchant and naval sailor. Charles was the second of six brothers: the eldest became a rector, the youngest became a rural dean; two, George and James, were lieutenants of the Royal Navy and drowned at sea. He also had two sisters, Mary and Sarah.

Sandys was educated at King's School, Canterbury from 1794 to 1800.

== Antiquarian career ==
While in Canterbury, Sandys became a keen antiquarian, especially with regards to those antiquities of the historic county of Kent. In 1844, he became an early member of the British Archaeological Association, out of an interest in Kentish archeology. On 23 December 1845, he presented an impression of a brass seal from the time of Edward III. The following year, he published his first book, A Critical Dissertation on Professor Willis's "Architectural History of Canterbury Cathedral" (1846). The work was dedicated to upholding William Gostling's view of the structural history of Canterbury Cathedral against Robert Willis' "fanciful hypothesis" that the cathedral was almost entirely built in Archbishop Lanfranc's time, after the Norman Conquest. J. G. Waller (in the Journal of the British Archeological Association) reviewed it favourably, claiming it "is exceeding useful and will be read with profit by all who feel interested in the metropolitan church of Canterbury", praising it for correctly pointing out flaws in Willis' work. Modern biographer of Willis, Alexandrina Buchanan, has taken a less positive view of the work, declaring that "in reality, it was Sandys who was guilty as charged [in making incorrect historical deductions], though Willis did not condescend to make this point".

In the 1846 third Annual Congress of the British Archaeological Association, then held in Gloucestershire, Sandys presented a paper, entitled "On the Celtic of Ancient British Mound, called 'The Dane-John Hill', at Canterbury", on the particulars of the local mound. The same year, on 18 June, he was elected a fellow of the Society of Antiquaries In 1848, he edited and introduced The Memorial and Case of the Clerici-Laici or Lay-Clerks of Canterbury Cathedral, a petition from the lay clerks of Canterbury Cathedral, to the Lord John Russell, asking for greater wages in comparison to the minor canons.

Sandys composed a brief manuscript history of Reculver, Kent, from the Roman occupation to Henry VIII's reign. This was included by C. Roach Smith in his History and Antiquities of Richborough, Reculver, and Lymne (1850), and the manuscript is now held in the library of Canterbury Cathedral. In 1851, Sandys composed Consuetudines Kanciae: A History of Gavelkind and other Remarkable Customs in the County of Kent, described by his ODNB biographer, Shirley Burgoyne Black, as "his principal work". In his conclusion to the work, Sandys patriotically summed it up as "conduct[ing] the reader to the primeval fountains of historic truth, — to the pure sources of the English Constitution. And thus have we attempted to pourtray, in vivid contrast, the conflicting elements of Saxon liberty and Norman despotism"; wishing the reader to "dr[i]nk deeply of the gushing tide of patriotism".

== Personal life and death ==
In 1808, Sandys became a solicitor, and took up a practice in Canterbury, which he continued until 1857. He married Sedley Frances Burdett in Bromley on 27 May 1815. The couple had several children but the only child to survive Sandys was one daughter, Sedley. Sandys came upon financial difficulty and consequently, in 1857, travelled abroad to Boulogne, where he died in 1858. His burial took place on 19 April 1858.
