= Hannah Russ =

British zooarchaeologist

Hannah Russ FSA
- Occupation: Archaeologist

Academic background
- Education: University of Bradford
- Thesis: (2011)

Academic work
- Institutions: University of Sheffield; Oxford Brookes University; Northern Archaeological Associates; University of Wales Trinity Saint David archaeology.biz
- Main interests: Zooarchaeology, Post-excavation, Field archaeology

Hannah Russ FSA MCIfA is a British zooarchaeologist with a specialism in fish remains.

Hannah is a co-presenter and finds specialist for Channel 4's The Great British Dig.

== Career ==
Russ gained her PhD in 2011 from the University of Bradford with a thesis titled 'A taphonomic approach to reconstructing Upper Palaeolithic hunter-gatherer fishing strategies. A load of old trout!'

She has worked at the University of Sheffield, Oxford Brookes University and Northern Archaeological Associates and has undertaken an honorary research role at University of Wales Trinity Saint David, working on the 'Wales Qatar Archaeological Project' and the Newport medieval ship.

On 21 February 2019 she was elected as a fellow of the Society of Antiquaries of London.

== Select publications ==
- Russ, H. 2017. "To fish, or not to fish? Using observations of recent hunter-gatherer fishing in the interpretation of Late Pleistocene fish bone assemblages". In Broderick, L. (ed.) People with Animals: Perspectives and Studies in Ethnozooarchaeology. Oxford: Oxbow.
- Melton, N. D. and Russ, H. 2013. "Archaeological evaluation undertaken in 2007 on the site of the 1834 Gristhorpe discovery". In Melton, N. D., J. Montgomery & K. Knüsel (eds) Gristhorpe Man: a life and death in the Bronze Age. Oxford: Oxbow
- Russ, H. & Petersen, A. 2013. "Fish and fishing during the Late Islamic period at Rubayqa, northern Qatar; preliminary results". Proceedings of the Seminar for Arabian Studies 43.
- Russ, H., Armit, I., McKenzie, J. & Jones, A.K.G. 2012. "Deep-sea fishing in Iron Age Scotland? New evidence from Broxmouth hillfort, East Lothian". Environmental Archaeology 17(2): 177 184.
- Russ, H. 2010. "The Eurasian eagle owl (Bubo bubo): a fish bone accumulator on Pleistocene cave sites?", Journal of Taphonomy 8(4): 281 290.
- Russ, H., Donahue, R. E. and Jones, A.K.G. 2008. "Trout Processing in the Upper Palaeolithic?" In N. Sykes and C. Newton (eds) Food and Drink in Archaeology I. Totnes: Prospect Books: 167–169.
