= North Yorkshire County Record Office =

North Yorkshire County Record Office holds the archives for the North Yorkshire area. The archives are held at Malpas Road, Northallerton, and run by North Yorkshire County Council.
