= Naomi Payne =

Archaeologist

Naomi Payne FSA is an archaeologist and small finds specialist, with a particular interest in Roman material culture. She was awarded her PhD at the University of Bristol in 2003 with a thesis titled: "The medieval residences of the Bishops of Bath and Wells, and Salisbury". She is a research associate at the University of Exeter and was elected as a Fellow of the Society of Antiquaries of London on 25 March 2021.

== Select publications ==
- Payne, N. 2019. "Bronze Age, Romano-British and Anglo-Saxon Funerary Remains on the Line of the Cirencester to Fairford Buried Electricity Cable Route", Transactions of the Bristol and Gloucestershire Archaeological Society
- Hughes, S., Payne, N. and Rainbird, P. 2017. "Salt of the Hearth: Understanding the Briquetage from a Later Romano-British Saltern at Pyde Drove, near Woolavington, Somerset", Britannia 48, 117–133.
- Hobson, M. S., Payne, N., Cousins, J. and Faulkner, N. et al. 2014. "A Middle Anglo-Saxon settlement", in Digging Sedgeford: A people's archaeology. Cromer: Poppyland, 79–136.
