= Gail Boyle =

British curator

- Occupations: Museum Curator; Archaeologist

Gail Boyle FMA FSA is a British curator.

== Career ==
Boyle is the former Senior Curator of Archaeology and World Cultures at Bristol Museums, Galleries & Archives, former Chair of the Society for Museum Archaeology, and a former Honorary Research Fellow at the University of Bristol. She was elected as a fellow of the Society of Antiquaries of London on 2 February 2015. She is also a fellow of the Museums Association.

Gail Boyle co-authored and published three national surveys of ‘Museums Collecting Archaeology’ (2016-2018) and national ‘Guidance on the Rationalisation of Archaeological Collections’ (2018). Gail designed and delivered the Society for Museum Archaeology Resources and Training Programme and was both a contributor to, and editor of, new ‘Standards and Guidance in the Care of Archaeological Collections’ (2020) and ‘Communicating Archaeology: Case studies in the use of, and engagement with, archaeological collections.’ (2021).

Boyle was first appointed to the Treasure Valuation Committee in 2018 and then re-appointed in 2023.

Gail Boyle is also Chair of the Board of Trustees for the Bristol & Gloucestershire Archaeological Society and sits on a wide variety of archaeological and heritage-related advisory groups including the Portable Antiquities Scheme Advisory Group and Historic England's Future of Archaeological Archives Programme.

Boyle became Chair of the Board of Trustees for the Council for British Archaeology in February 2024.

== Publications ==
- Boyle, G. 2007. "One object, several thousand pieces . . . and no budget: the Newton St Loe Mosaic Project", The Museums Archaeologist 30, 49-53.
- Roberts, D. Dr, Boyle G, et al, 2015. Bristol Museums: iBeacons and Visitor Engagement Research & Development Report (The Hidden Museum Project). NESTA
- Booth, N., Boyle G., Rawden A., Museums Collecting Archaeology Research Reports 2016-18. Historic England
- Boyle G., Hutchinson, D. Mullan, G.J., Rossington, R.J., 2017. Bone Hole, Cheddar Gorge, Somerset: archaeological and palaeontological collections. UBSS Proceedings, 27(2), pp 161-183.
- Baxter K., Boyle G., Creighton L., 2018. The Rationalisation of Archaeological Archives in Museums. Historic England
- Boyle, G., 2019. ‘Always on the Receiving End? Reflections on Archaeology, Museums and Policy’, The Historic Environment: Policy & Practice. 10:3-4, pp.380-394.
- Boyle, G. and Rawden A. eds, 2020. Standards in the Care of Archaeological Collections. SMA
- Boyle, G. and Butterworth J, eds. 2021. Communicating Archaeology: Case studies in the use of, and engagement with, archaeological collections. SMA
- Boyle, G., 2022. ‘Unlocking the potential of archaeological archives’, The Oxford Handbook of Museum Archaeology, pp 271-288. Oxford University Press.
- Williams. H, et al, eds, 2022 ‘A National Strategy for Treasure? – an interview with Gail Boyle’, The Public Archaeology of Treasure pp 78-95. Archaeopress.
