= Tanja Romankiewicz =

Archaeologist

Tanja Romankiewicz is senior lecturer in archaeology and a director of the Centre for Historical Reconstruction Research at the University of Edinburgh.

== Biography ==
Romankiewicz's research focusses on Prehistoric and Roman-period buildings. Her PhD on "The complex roundhouses of the Scottish Iron Age" was undertaken jointly between the University of Edinburgh and the Technische Universität Berlin. She joined the University of Edinburgh staff in 2013.

She is a council member of the Royal Archaeological Institute. Romankiewicz was elected as a Fellow of the Society of Antiquaries of London in July 2026.

== Select publications ==
- Romankiewicz, T. 2011. The Complex Roundhouses of the Scottish Iron Age: An architectural analysis of complex Atlantic roundhouses (brochs and galleried duns), with reference to wheelhouses and timber roundhouses. British Archaeological Reports.
- Romankiewicz, T. 2016. "Land, Stone, Trees, Identity, Ambition: the Building Blocks of Brochs", Archaeological Journal 173, 1-29.
- Romankiewicz, T. 2018. "The Line, the Void and the Current: Iron Age Art from a Design Theory Perspective", Oxford Journal of Archaeology 37, 45–59 doi:10.1111/ojoa.12130
- Romankiewicz, T. 2020. Vision and visual experience in European Celtic Art: towards new interpretations from neuro-atypical perspectives, World Archaeology 52, 264-283.
- Romankiewicz, T., Russell, B., Bailey, G., Gardner, T., Snyder, J.R. & Beckett, C.T.S. 2022, "Another wall of turf': Geoarchaeological analysis of the Antonine Wall at 72 Grahamsdyke Street, Laurieston, Falkirk", Proceedings of the Society of Antiquaries of Scotland 151, 103-141. doi:10.9750/PSAS.151.1353
- Russell, B., Romankiewicz, T., Gardner, T., Birley, A., Snyder, J.R., & Beckett, C.T.S. 2022. "Building with turf at Roman Vindolanda: multi-scalar analysis of earthen materials, construction techniques, and landscape context", Archaeological Journal 179, 169–210. doi:10.1080/00665983.2021.1949148
