= Emma J. Wells =

English church historian, academic, author, and broadcaster

- Born: Emma Jane Wells; 12 June 1986 (age 40)
- Education: University of York, Durham University
- Occupations: Historian, academic, author, and broadcaster
- Website: https://www.york.ac.uk/lifelonglearning/pg-staff/emma-wells/

Emma Jane Wells, FSA (born 1986) is an English church historian, academic, author, and broadcaster, specialising in the ecclesiastical and architectural history of the late medieval and early modern age. She is currently a lecturer in Ecclesiastical and Architectural History at the University of York. Wells is a Fellow of the Society of Antiquaries of London (FSA), a Senior Fellow of the Higher Education Academy and a founding member of the Centre for Parish Church Studies (CPCS).

She is a Guardian for the Society for the Protection of Ancient Buildings (SPAB) and a member of the Hexham and Newcastle Diocesan Advisory Committee (DAC). Wells is also the secretary and assistant editor for the Society for Church Archaeology.

== Early life and education ==
Wells grew up in North Yorkshire, on the fringes of the Yorkshire Dales, where her grandmother instilled a passion for medieval architecture. She attended a Church of England primary school before being educated at St Francis Xavier (Roman Catholic) School in Richmond and the University of York, where she read Art History and Buildings Archaeology. She was awarded her Doctorate from Durham University in 2013 with a thesis entitled "An Archaeology of Sensory Experience: Pilgrimage in the Medieval Church c.1170–c.1550".

== Career ==
During her doctoral research, Wells was a research consultant for the 2011 British Museum's "Treasures of Heaven: Saints, Relics, and Devotion in Medieval Europe" exhibition and the 2012 Lindisfarne Gospels Durham Leverhulme Trust project.

In 2012, Wells established Emma J. Wells Heritage Consultancy. The firm provided professional heritage and archaeology services, and was responsible for co-organising and co-leading a series of community projects throughout 2013 and 2014 including the HLF funded project, Charting Chipeling which sought to uncover the social and architectural history, and underlying archaeology, of Kiplin Hall in North Yorkshire, and was a contributing author to the resulting publication, Charting Chipeling: The Archaeology of the Kiplin Estate. She was also a partner on the HLF-funded Ledgerstone Survey of England and Wales.

Between 2013 and 2014, Wells became a Visiting Lecturer in Theology at York St John University. In 2014, Wells was appointed as Programme Director and Associate Lecturer for the PGDip in Parish Church Studies at the University of York. In 2014, Wells was elected as Full Member of the Chartered Institute for Archaeologists.

In 2016, she published Pilgrim Routes of the British Isles, which led the modern traveller along seven British routes with historic origins and taking in world-famous sites such as Holywell and Canterbury as well as locations on paths not so widely travelled. The book was lauded by Oxford art historian Janina Ramirez as "a beautifully written and hugely useful book".

In 2017, Wells was appointed as Director for the new collaborative MA in English Building History between the Centre for Lifelong Learning and Department of Archaeology at the University of York, which she led in its creation, design, and development. Wells is a notable historical writer on the church and related topics with her work appearing in BBC History, History Today, History Revealed, Church Times, Catholic Herald, Aeon, and BBC Countryfile (for which she wrote a regular column throughout 2019).

Between 2018 and 2021, Wells was appointed a Research Associate of the Department for Archaeology at the University of York. In September 2021, she was appointed as Research Fellow of the Department for Archaeology at Durham University. She was promoted to Lecturer in Ecclesiastical and Architectural History at the University of York in 2019.

Wells is a specialist lecturer and guide for Andante Travels and Promenades Travel unravelling the history of architectural sites to parties across the UK. She has been a regular historical advisor and consultant for documentaries and, in 2019, was appointed as ecclesiastical advisor for the first series of the BBC TV series Gentleman Jack. In 2020, she co-established the publication series Reinterpreting the Middle Ages: From Medieval to Neo, published by Belgian publishing house, Brepols. She is co-founder of the online store, What is History?, dedicated to history-related accessories and apparel and aimed at championing under-presented artists working within the fields of History and Archaeology.

Her next book, Heaven On Earth: The Lives & Legacies of the World’s Greatest Cathedrals, will be published by Head of Zeus in July 2022. She is currently working on her third book about relic merchants, who bought and sold their way through the churches of medieval Christendom.

== Media ==
Wells's broadcasting work includes appearances on Yesterday's The Architecture the Railways Built, Curiosity Stream's A History of Home and Secrets of Notre Dame: Ancient Engineering and BBC1's From the Dales to the Sea – A Great British Story. She has appeared on History Hit's Art Detective and Gone Medieval podcasts, Hidden Histories with Helen Carr, HistoryExtra podcast, Sick to Death's A History of Medicine in 10 Objects, Killing Time with Rebecca Rideal, and BBC Countryfile's plodcast.

Wells is also the writer and presenter of the three-part series, St Cuthbert’s Way, which premiered on Viral History's YouTube channel in 2018.

== Publications ==
=== Books ===
- Wells, Emma J. (2022). Heaven On Earth: The Lives & Legacies of the World’s Greatest Cathedrals. London: Head of Zeus. ISBN 978-1788541947
- Wells, Emma J. (2016). Pilgrim Routes of the British Isles. London: Robert Hale. ISBN 978-0719817076

=== Chapters ===
- Wells, Emma J. (2021). William Joy, Oxford Dictionary of National Biography. Oxford: Oxford University Press. DOI: https://doi.org/10.1093/odnb/9780198614128.013.90000369743
- Wells, Emma J. (2018) "The Medieval Senses", in Gerrard, C. and Gutierrez, A (eds) The Oxford Handbook of Later Medieval Archaeology in Britain. Oxford: Oxford University Press, 681–96. ISBN 978-0198858041
- Wells, Emma J. (2017) "Kipling through the Archives" and "Historic Buildings Analysis", in Brightman, J. (ed.) Charting Chipeling: The Archaeology of the Kiplin Estate. North Yorkshire. Solstice Heritage, 6–17; 31–50. ISBN 978-0993310607
- Wells, Emma J. (2013) "'...he went round the holy places praying and offering': Evidence for Cuthbertine Pilgrimage to Lindisfarne and Farne in the Late Medieval Period" in Ashbee, J. and J. Luxford (eds) Newcastle and Northumberland: Roman and Medieval Architecture and Art. Leeds: Maney, 214–31. ISBN 978-1907975929
