= Quita Mould =

Archaeologist

Quita Mould FSA is an archaeologist, specialising in small finds and the identification of leather.

== Biography ==
Mould has a BA in Archaeology and Geography from Southampton University and an MA in Archaeology from the Institute of Archaeology. She has contributed to numerous small finds reports and analysis from Roman, Early-Medieval, and Medieval sites. She was one of the principal authors of the Historic England guidance on "Waterlogged Organic Artefacts". She was elected as a Fellow of the Society of Antiquaries of London on 1 January 2005.

Mould is the secretary of the Archaeological Leather Group and the Membership Secretary of the Finds Research Group.

== Select publications ==
- Volken, M., Mould, Q., and Cameron, E. 2020. "A reassessment of leatherwork from the Sutton Hoo Ship Burial", Antiquaries Journal doi:10.1017/S0003581520000426
- Keiley, J. and Mould, Q. 2017. "Leatherworking in South-Eastern Britain in the Roman Period", in Bird, D. (ed). Agriculture and Industry in South-Eastern Roman Britain. Oxford, Oxbow. 236–254
- Mould, Q. and Cameron, E. 2016. "The animal pelt", in Jones, A.M., Preserved in the Peat: An extraordinary Bronze Age burial on Whitehorse Hill, Dartmoor, and its wider context. Oxford, Oxbow Books. 64–68
- Thompson, R. and Mould, Q. (eds) 2011. Leather Tanneries: the archaeological evidence. London: Archetype
- Mould, Q. 2011. "Devil's Crafts and Dragon's Skins? Sheaths, Shoes and Other Leatherwork", in Clegg Hyer, M. and Owen-Crocker, G. R. (eds) The Material Culture of Daily Living in the Anglo-Saxon World. University of Exeter Press, 93–115
- Mould, Q. 2011. "Domestic life", in Allason-Jones, L. (ed.) Artefacts in Roman Britain, Cambridge, Cambridge University Press, 153–79
- Mould, Q. 2009. "The Roman Shoes" and "The Medieval Leather", in Howard-Davis, C. The Carlisle Millennium Project excavations in Carlisle, 1998–2001. Volume 2: The Finds. Oxford, Oxford Archaeology North, 831–857
