= Thomas Falkingham =

English-born Australian politician

Thomas Falkingham (5 February 1884 – 23 December 1957) was an English-born Australian politician.

He was born in Yorkshire to Thomas Falkingham and Anne Swales. He was a boilermaker, living in what is now South Africa from 1906 to 1908 when he migrated to New South Wales. On 31 July 1914 he married Nellie Crompton, with whom he had three children. He was assistant secretary of the Boilermakers' Union's Redfern branch from 1920 to 1932. He was arrested during the 1924 seamen's strike, and was also active on the Trades and Labor Council. From 1931 to 1934 he was a Labor member of the New South Wales Legislative Council. He was secretary of the Boilermakers' Union from 1933 to 1936, when he was expelled from the Labor Party as part of the split that formed the short-lived Industrial Labor Party. Falkingham died at Rose Bay in 1957.
