= Kristina Krawiec =

English geoarchaeologist

Kristina Krawiec FSA is an English geoarchaeologist. She is Head of Geoarchaeology at York Archaeological Trust. Krawiec has been involved in a number of excavations across England, particularly of wetland areas. She was elected as a fellow of the Society of Antiquaries of London on 17 November 2022.

== Education ==
Krawiec has a BA (Hons) in Prehistory and Archaeology and an MPhil in Archaeological Practice from the University of Sheffield.

== Career ==
Krawiec is a geoarcheologist, and is head of Geoarcheology at York Archeological Trust. Krawiec specialises in wetland archeology, especially the recording and preservation of archeological wood.

She was involved in a number of archeological digs, including the discovery of an Iron Age road in East Anglia in 2011, thought to date to around 75 BC, which may have been a route across the River Waveney. The timber posts from the causeway are on display in the Beccles Museum.

In 2017, she was the senior archaeologist on a team that excavated Wellington Dock navigation channel in the Port of Dover. The team found a mammoth tooth, which is potentially 14,000 years old. More recently she led the investigations of a site on the River Dove at Dovecliff. Work to create a bypass channel for the removal of a weir revealed closely-packed timbers, which were excavated. The timbers were up to 5m long, and were oak. Krawiec was able to date them to the mid to late 16th century, and to establish that the uprights were densely packed with brush to form a weir.

Krawiec was elected as a fellow of the Society of Antiquaries of London on 17 November 2022.

== Select publications ==
- Lobb, M., Krawiec, K., Howard, A.J, Geary, B.R., and Chapman, H.P. 2010. "A new approach to recording and monitoring wet-preserved archaeological wood using three-dimensional laser scanning", Journal of Archaeological Science37, 2295-2999. doi:10.1016/j.jas.2010.06.020
- Krawiec, K., Gearey, B.R., Chapman, H.P., Hopla, E-J., Bamforth, M., Griffiths, C., Hill, T.C.B., and Tyers, I. 2011. "A Late Prehistoric Timber Alignment in the Waveney Valley, Suffolk: Excavations at Barsham Marshes", Journal of Wetland Archaeology, 10, 46-70. doi:10.1179/jwa.2011.10.1.46
- Cuttler, R., Hepburn, S., Hewitson, C., and Krawiec, K. 2012. Gorse Stacks - 2000 Years of Quarrying and Waste Disposal in Chester (BAR British Series 563).
- A. K. Dowsett; K. Krawiec; T. C. B. Hill; E. Allison; J. E. Whittaker (2021). "Seaside Recreation Ground: A Multi-Proxy Palaeoenvironmental Investigation on the Coastal Edge of the Willingdon Levels, Eastbourne, East Sussex, UK". Journal of Wetland Archaeology. 21 (1–2): 40–60. doi:10.1080/14732971.2023.2189561. Wikidata Q133309817.
