= Brian Hartley (archaeologist) =

British archaeologist (1929–2005)

Brian Hartley MA FSA
- Born: 31 December 1929
- Died: 26 April 2005 (aged 75)
- Spouses: Elizabeth Blank; Katharine Kaine (m. 1955; div. 1973)

Academic background
- Education: Trinity Hall Cambridge

Academic work
- Discipline: Archaeology
- Sub-discipline: Roman archaeology
- Institutions: Leeds University

Brian Rodgerson Hartley MA, FSA (31 December 1929 – 26 April 2005) was a British archaeologist who specialised in Roman pottery studies.

== Early life and education ==
Hartley was born in Chester in 1929 and won a scholarship to the King's School Chester. While still at school he took part in his first excavation, at Heronbridge, Cheshire. In 1948 he heard a lecture by Sir Ian Richmond who became a great influence on him. After national service in the RAF, he studied natural sciences at Trinity Hall, Cambridge. He then gained a diploma in prehistory and became research assistant to Grahame Clark. He also attended the archaeological summer school at Great Casterton run by Graham Webster. Here he met Philip Corder and John Gillam whose knowledge of Roman pottery encouraged his study of samian ware.

== Archaeological career ==
In 1957 he was appointed as a lecturer in Roman-British archaeology at the University of Leeds, becoming a Reader in 1967. He remained at Leeds until his retirement in 1995.

He directed the training dig for Leeds students at the Roman fort at Bainbridge, North Yorkshire. In 1960 an inscription was discovered which showed the name of a previously unknown governor of Britain C. Valerius Pudens. Hartley also directed other major excavations in Yorkshire, at the forts of Ilkley, Bowes (with Sheppard Frere), Slack, Lease Rigg and the villa at Kirk Sink, Gargrave.

== Samian pottery ==
Brian Hartley became the leading expert on the type of Roman pottery known as samian ware or Terra sigillata. In 1962 he, along with his colleges Sheppard Frere and Hugues Vertet, began excavating kilns that made samian in Lezoux (Puy-de-Dôme, France).

In 1963 Hartley began a project to compile an index of potters' stamps on samian ware. This was an update of Felix Oswald's work from 1931 that had become outdated due to the huge number of new samian stamps that had been excavated since Oswald's work had been published. Potter's stamps could be used to refine the dating of samian pottery and provide closer dating of archaeological sites. The text of the catalogue had reached 5000 pages and remained unpublished at the time of his death.

He published a large number of papers on the Roman archaeology of northern Britain and more synthetic works including The Roman Occupations of Scotland (1972) and The Brigantes (1988, with Leon Fitts),.

== Honours and awards ==
He became a fellow of the Society of Antiquaries on London in 1957.

== Personal life ==
Brian Hartley was married twice, first to Katherine F. Kaine, also a specialist in Roman pottery, marriage dissolved in 1973, and then to Elizabeth Blank, a museum curator.
