= Charles Upham Shepard =

American mineralogist

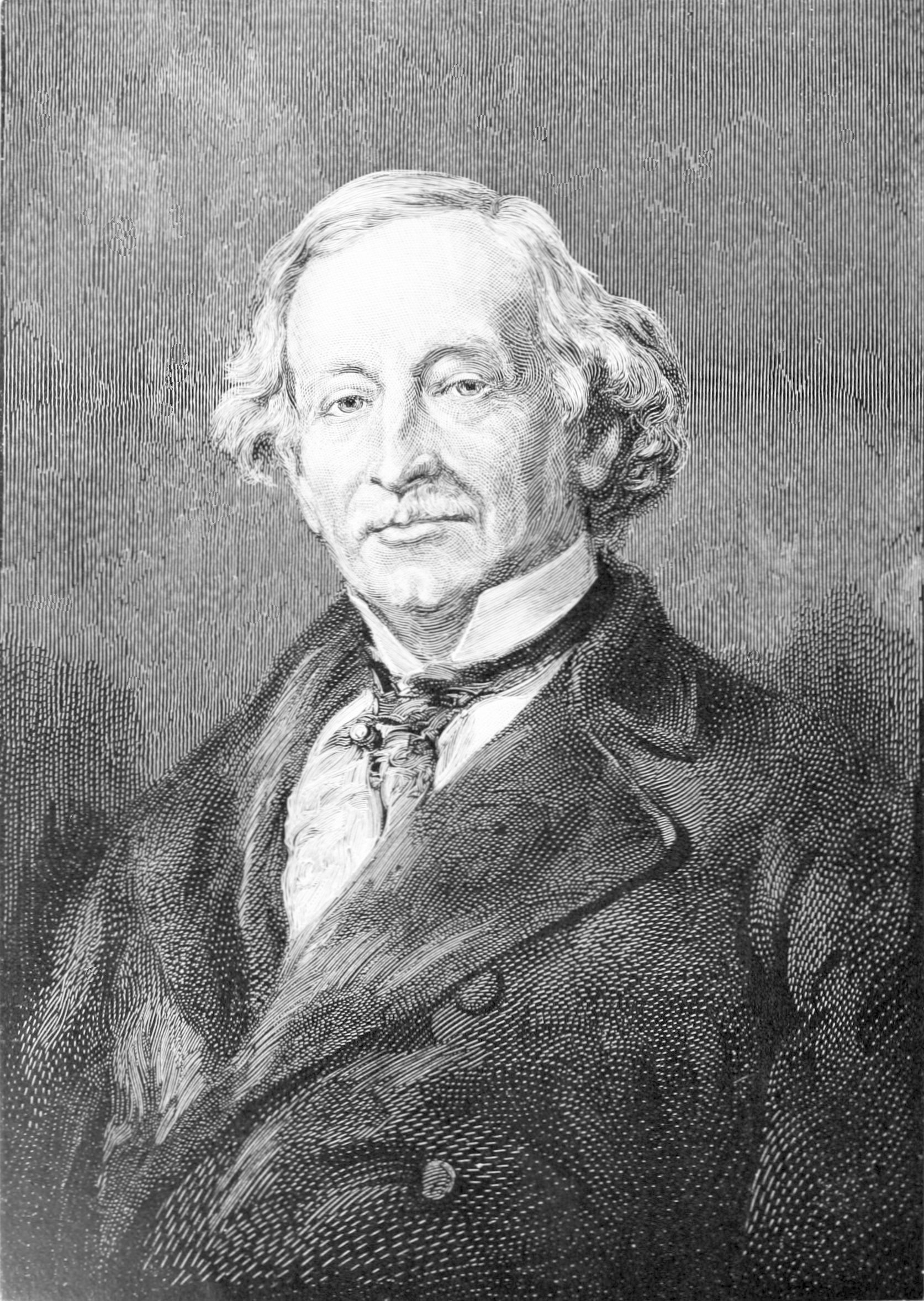
A portrait of Shepard published in The Popular Science Monthly, 1895

Charles Upham Shepard (born in Little Compton, Rhode Island, 29 June 1804; died in Charleston, South Carolina, 1 May 1886) was an American mineralogist.

== Biography ==
He graduated from Amherst College in 1824, and spent a year in Cambridge, Massachusetts, studying botany and mineralogy with Thomas Nuttall, and at the same time gave instructed on these topics in Boston. The study of mineralogy led to his preparation of papers on that subject which he sent to the American Journal of Science, and in this manner he became acquainted with Benjamin Silliman, the elder. He was invited in 1827 to become Silliman's assistant, and continued so until 1831. Meanwhile, for a year he was curator of Franklin Hall, an institution that was established by James Brewster in New Haven, Connecticut, for popular lectures on scientific subjects to mechanics.

In 1830 he was appointed lecturer on natural history at Yale University, and held that place until 1847. He was associated with Silliman in the scientific examination of the culture and manufacture of sugar that was undertaken by the latter at the special request of the secretary of the treasury; and the southern states, particularly Louisiana and Georgia, were assigned to him to report upon. From 1834 until 1861, he filled the chair of chemistry of the Medical College of South Carolina in Charleston. He relinquished the position at the beginning of the Civil War, but in 1865, upon the urgent invitation of his former colleagues, he resumed his duties for a few years.

While in Charleston he discovered rich deposits of phosphate of lime in the immediate vicinity of that city. Their great value in agriculture and subsequent use in the manufacture of superphosphate fertilizers proved an important addition to the chemical industries of South Carolina. In 1845 he was chosen professor of chemistry and natural history in Amherst, which chair was divided in 1852, and he continued to deliver the lectures on natural history until 1877, when he was made professor emeritus.

He was associated in 1835 with James G. Percival in the geological survey of Connecticut, and throughout his life he was actively engaged in the study of mineralogy. He announced in 1835 his discovery of his first new species of microlite, that of warwickite in 1838, that of danburite in 1839, and he afterward described many other new minerals until shortly before his death.

Shepard acquired a large collection of minerals, which at one time was unsurpassed in this country, and which in 1877 was purchased by Amherst College, but five years later was partially destroyed by fire. Early in life, he began the study and collection of meteorites, and his cabinet, long the largest in the country, likewise became the property of Amherst. His papers on this subject, from 1829 till 1882, were nearly forty in number and appeared chiefly in the American Journal of Science.

Shepard received an honorary M.D. degree from Dartmouth College in 1836, and honorary LL.D. from Amherst in 1857. He was a member of many American and foreign societies, including the Imperial Society of Natural Science in St. Petersburg, the Royal Society of Göttingen, and the Society of Natural Sciences in Vienna.

== Works ==
In addition to his many papers and reports on mines in the United States, he published:

- Treatise on Mineralogy (New Haven; 3d ed., enlarged, 1855)
- Report on the Geological Survey of Connecticut (1837)

== Family ==
His son, also named Charles Upham Shepard (born in New Haven, Connecticut, 4 October 1842), was also a chemist. He graduated from Yale in 1863 and at the University of Göttingen in 1867, with the degree of M.D. On his return, he was appointed professor of chemistry in the Medical College of the state of South Carolina, which chair he held until 1883. Afterward, he has devoted himself entirely to the practice of analytical chemistry. The younger Shepard was active in developing the chemical resources of South Carolina, and paid special attention to the nature and composition of the phosphate deposits of that state.

In 1887, he presented the second cabinet of minerals that was left by his father, numbering more than 10,000 specimens, to the collections at Amherst, and his cabinet of representatives of more than 200 different meteorites has been deposited in the Smithsonian Institution in Washington, D.C.
