= Margaret Joyce Rowe =

British historian (1926–2020)

Margaret Joyce Rowe FSA
- Occupation: Historian

Margaret Joyce "Joy" Rowe FSA (1926 - 7 September 2020) was a British historian. She was a pioneering historian of the study of Catholicism in East Anglia, for which she was awarded a Diocesan Medal by the Diocese of East Anglia on her 90th Birthday in 2016.

== Biography ==
In the 1950s Rowe taught history at a convent school at Hengrave Hall run by the Religious of the Assumption. She published a history of Catholicism in the Bury St Edmunds area in 1958. She was a mentor to the ecclesiastical historian Diarmaid MacCulloch. She dedicated much of her list to the study of Parish records in East Anglia and the presence and role of Catholic communities in this area. Rowe was a leading member of the Catholic Record Society and the Suffolk Records Society.

Rowe was elected as a fellow of the Society of Antiquaries of London on 5 May 2002.

== Publications ==
- Rowe, J. 1958 (reprinted 1980) "The Story of Catholic Bury St. Edmunds". Bury St Edmunds.
- Rowe, J. 1959. ‘The Medieval Hospitals of Bury St Edmunds’, Medical History 2(4), 253–63.
- Rowe, J. and McGrath, P. 1960. ‘The Recusancy of Sir Thomas Cornwallis’, Proceedings of the Suffolk Institute of Archaeology and History 28 (1960), 226–71.
- Rowe, J. 1964. "Ixworth Abbey, Bury St. Edmunds, Suffolk: A Short History and Simple Guide" (Ixworth: privately printed).
- Rowe, J. and McGrath, P. 1984. ‘The Marian Priests under Elizabeth I’, Recusant History 17(2), 103–20.
- Rowe, J. and McGrath, P. 1986. ‘Anstruther analysed: the Elizabethan Seminary Priests’, Recusant History 18(1) 1–13,
- Rowe, J. 1988. ‘Roman Catholic Recusancy’ in David Dymond and Edward Martin (eds), An Historical Atlas of Suffolk. Ipswich: Suffolk County Council, 88–89.
- Rowe, J. and McGrath, P. 1989. ‘The Elizabethan Priests: their Harbourers and Helpers’, Recusant History 19(3), 209–33.
- Rowe, J. 1991. ‘Suffolk Sectaries and Papists, 1596–1616’ in E. S. Leedham-Green (ed.), "Religious Dissent in East Anglia. Cambridge: Cambridge Antiquarian Society, 37–41.
- Rowe, J. and McGrath, P. 1991. ‘The Imprisonment of Catholics for Religion under Elizabeth I’, Recusant History 20(4), 415–35.
- Rowe, J. 1994. ‘Roman Catholic Recusancy’ in T. Ashwin and A. Davison (eds), An Historical Atlas of Norfolk. Norwich: Norfolk Museums Service, 138–9.
- Rowe, J. 1996. ‘The 1767 Census of Papists in the Diocese of Norwich: The Social Composition of the Roman Catholic Community’ in David Chadd (ed.), Religious Dissent in East Anglia III. Norwich: University of East Anglia, 187–234.
- Rowe, J. 1998. ‘“The Lopped Tree”: The Re-formation of the Suffolk Catholic Community’ in Nicholas Tyacke (ed.), England’s Long Reformation 1500–1800. Abingdon: UCL Press, 167–94.
- Rowe, J. 2004. ‘Protestant Sectaries and Separatists in Suffolk 1594–1630’, Journal of the United Reformed Church History Society 7(4), 225–34.
- Rowe, J. and Young, F. 2016 ‘East Anglian Catholics in the Reign of Elizabeth, 1559–1603’ in Francis Young (ed.), Catholic East Anglia: A History of the Catholic Faith in Norfolk, Suffolk, Cambridgeshire and Peterborough. Leominster: Gracewing, 37–60.
