= Ruth Shaffrey =

British geoarchaeologist

Dr Ruth Shaffrey FSA is an archaeologist.

== Biography ==
Shaffrey was awarded her PhD in Archaeology and Geology from the University of Reading in 1998. She specialises in the study of quern-stones and millstones and is a worked stone specialist for Oxford Archaeology. Her thesis formed the basis of her 2006 BAR volume on Romano-British quern-stones. In February 2021 she reported on the discovery of a quern-stone decorated with a phallus from excavations on the A14 road in Cambridgeshire.

Shaffrey was elected as a Fellow of the Society of Antiquaries of London on 2 February 2019.

== Select publications ==
- Shaffrey, R. 2003. "The rotary querns from the Society of Antiquaries' excavations at Silchester, 1890--1909", Britannia 34, 143–174.
- Mithen, S. J., Finlayson, B. and Shaffrey, R. 2005. "Sexual symbolism in the Early Neolithic of the southern Levant: pestles and mortars from WF16", Documenta Prahistorica, 32, 103–110.
- Shaffrey, R. 2006. Grinding and milling : a study of Romano-British rotary querns and millstones made from Old Red Sandstone (BAR British Series 409). British Archaeological Reports.
- Shaffrey, R. and Roe, F. 2011. The Widening use of Lodsworth Stone: Neolithic to Romano-British Quern Distribution. In D.F. Williams and D.P.S. Peacock, (eds.) Bread for the People: The Archaeology of Mills and Milling, Archaeopress, Oxford, 309–324.
- Ford, B. Poore, D. Shaffrey, R. and Wilkinson D.R.P. 2013. Excavations at the Oracle site, Reading, Berkshire, Thames Valley Landscapes monograph series.
- Shaffrey, R. 2015. "Intensive milling practices in the Romano-British landscape of southern England. Using newly established criteria for distinguishing millstones from rotary querns", Britannia 46, 55–92.
- Shaffrey, R. (ed) 2017. Written in Stone. Papers on the function, form and provenancing of prehistoric stone objects in memory of Fiona Roe.
- Shaffrey, R. 2017. "Roman Ewell: a review of the querns and millstones and implications for understanding the organisation of grain processing". Surrey Archaeological Collections 100, 259–269. doi:10.5284/1069434
- Shaffrey, R. 2018. "Grain processing in and around Roman Cirencester. What can the querns and millstones tell us about supply to the Roman town?", Trans Bristol and Gloucestershire Archaeol Soc 136, 161–70.
- Shaffrey, R. 2019. "The movement of ideas in Late Iron Age and Early Roman Britain: an imported rotary quern design in south-western England, Britannia 50, 73-82.
- Shaffrey, R. 2019. "A complete lower rotary quern from Chilworth, and how it assists in understanding the morphology of Lodsworth stone querns". Surrey Archaeological Collections 102, 265–272.
- Shaffrey, R. 2021. "The rotary querns and millstones of Roman Exeter: supplying and feeding the Fortress and Town", in S. Rippon and N. Holbrook (eds.) Studies in the Roman and Medieval Archaeology of Exeter, Exeter: A Place in Time, volume 2, Oxbow Books, 415–426.
