= Elizabeth Hartley (archaeologist) =

Archaeologist and museum curator

Elizabeth Grayson Hartley FSA
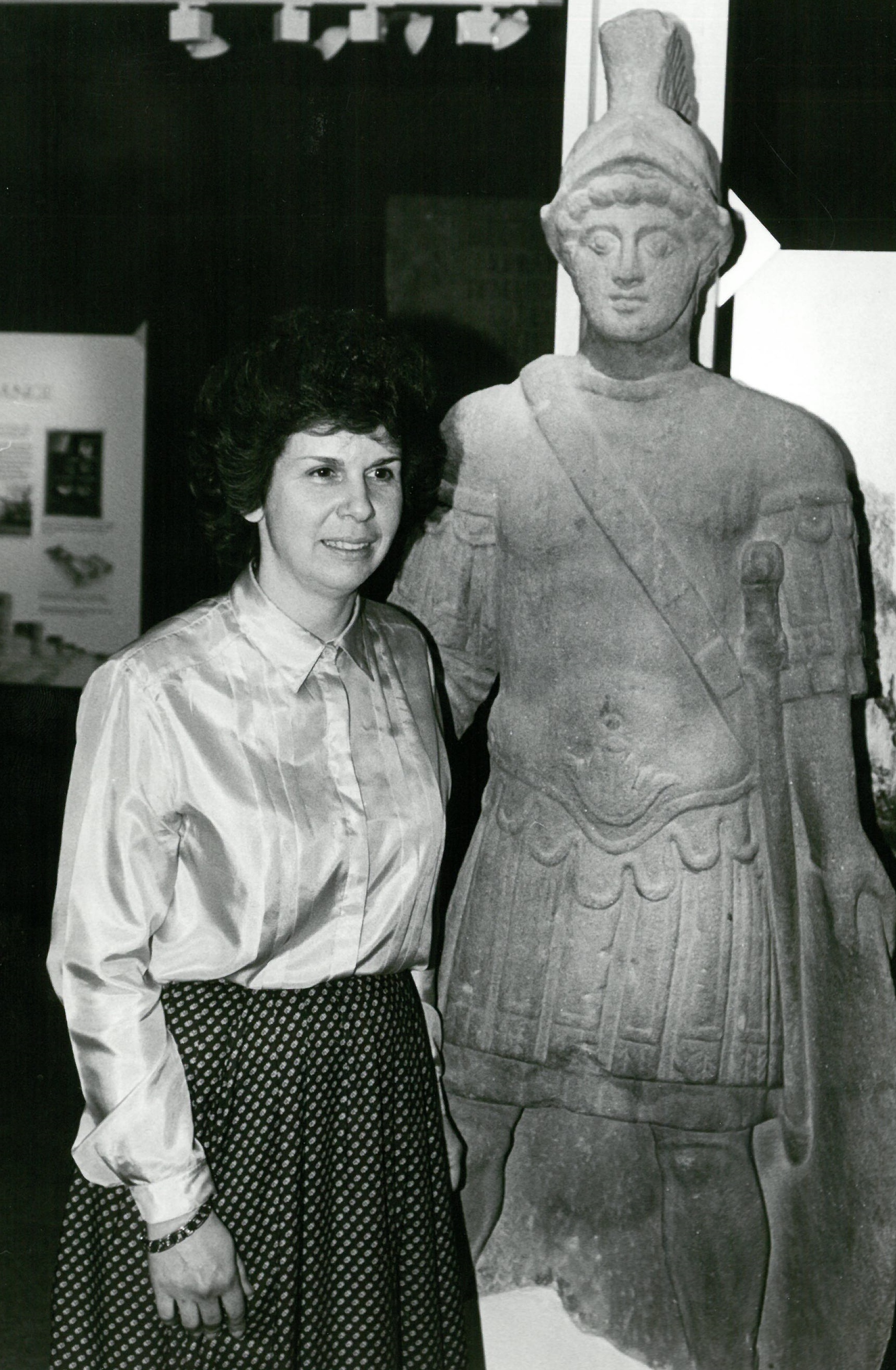
- Elizabeth Hartley at the opening of a new Roman Exhibition in the Yorkshire Museum, 1980s.
- Born: Elizabeth Grayson Blank; 1947; Summit, New Jersey
- Died: 31 January 2018 (aged 70–71); York
- Occupations: Archaeologist; Museum curator

Academic background
- Education: University of London

Academic work
- Discipline: Archaeology
- Sub-discipline: Roman archaeology
- Institutions: British Museum; Yorkshire Museum

Elizabeth Grayson Hartley, FSA (née Blank, 1947 – 31 January 2018) was an American archaeologist and curator. She spent most of her career as the Keeper of Archaeology at the Yorkshire Museum in York.

== Career ==
Hartley attended the Kent Place School (Summit, New Jersey) and Mount Holyoke College (South Hadley, Massachusetts). After graduating she studied at the University of Edinburgh and the University of London.

She was appointed the first Keeper of Archaeology at the Yorkshire Museum in 1971 and worked in this post until her retirement in 2007. The museum acquired some important objects during this time, including the Coppergate Helmet, and the Middleham Jewel.

Peter Addyman described her as ‘[the] most determined, imaginative and devoted American expert – whose legacy to her adopted city will extend far into the future’.

=== Exhibitions ===
Hartley oversaw the development of several important exhibitions in the Yorkshire Museum. The 1976 exhibition "The Viking Kingdom of York" was seen by over 78,000 visitors. The Coppergate helmet was first put onto display in a permanent gallery space in 1980 following a £30,000 grant from the British Museum as part of the "International Viking Exhibition".

A third successful Viking exhibition, "The Vikings in England" was opened by the Prince of Wales on 30 March 1982 and was seen by over 235,000 visitors before it closed in October of the same year. This exhibition was awarded the European Museum of the Year Special Exhibition Award as a result of the presentation of the exhibition in the Museum and for additional educational projects organised by Hartley.

In 2001 she developed an exhibition titled "Alcuin & Charlemagne: The Golden Age of York".

The 2006 exhibition "Constantine the Great: York's Roman Emperor" was described as "the most important archaeological-historical loan exhibition to have been held in a provincial British museum". Hartley was "the driving force" behind the exhibition, which attracted over 58,000 visitors.

Beyond the Yorkshire Museum, in 1978 Hartley developed an exhibition for the Malton Museum in advance of the museum moving premises from the Milton Rooms to the Old Town hall.

She was elected a Fellow of the Society of Antiquaries of London in November 1995, and was a trustee of the Malton Museum.

== Personal life ==
Elizabeth G. Hartley (née Blank) was originally from Summit, New Jersey. She met her husband Brian Hartley, also an archaeologist, whilst working at the British Museum. They married in 1973 at St Columba's United Reformed Church, York.

== Selected publications ==
- Hall, R. A. and Hartley, E. 1976. The Viking Kingdom of York. York, Yorkshire Museum.ISBN 9780905807010
- Hartley, E. 1985. Roman Life at the Yorkshire Museum. York, Yorkshire Museum. ISBN 9780905807027
- Hartley, E. 1985. Anglo-Saxon & Viking life at the Yorkshire Museum : gallery guide. York, Yorkshire Museum ISBN 9780905807010
- Wilson, P., Hartley, E., and Wacher, S. 2003. 'John Stewart Wacher BSc, MIFA, FSA: an archaeological bibliography', in Wilson, P. (ed) The archaeology of Roman towns: studies in honour of John S. Wacher. Oxford, Oxbow. xvi. ISBN 1842171038
- Hartley, E., Hawkes, J., Henig, M., and Mee, F. (eds) 2006. Constantine the Great: York's Roman Emperor. Lund Humphries ISBN 9780853319283
- Hartley, E. with Bidwell, P., 2012. "Excavations of an early Roman fort and Watling Street at Wigston Parva, 1969 to 1970", Transactions of the Leicestershire Archaeological and Historical Society 86, 117-134.
- Hartley, E. No date. 'Roman Interiors' (Interim Report). York, York Archaeological Trust
