= Chiara Bonacchi =

Archaeologist

Chiara Bonacchi FSA FSA Scot
- Occupations: Archaeologist; Academic

Academic background
- Education: University College London

Academic work
- Discipline: Archaeology
- Institutions: University of Edinburgh

Chiara Bonacchi FSA FSA Scot is an archaeologist. She is Senior Lecturer at the University of Stirling.

== Career ==
Bonacchi has a BA in Archaeology and an MA in Medieval Archaeology from the University of Florence. She gained her PhD in Public Archaeology from University College London. She is an International Executive Committee member of the Association of Critical Heritage Studies and sits on the advisory board of the Journal of Open Archaeology Data.

Bonacchi was elected as a fellow of the Society of Antiquaries of London on 10 October 2018.

== Select publications ==
- Nucciotti, M., Bonacchi, C. and Molducci, C. (Eds) 2019. Archeologia Pubblica in Italia. Florence: Florence University Press.
- Bonacchi, C. and Krzyzanska, M. 2019. "Digital heritage research re-theorised: ontologies and epistemologies in a world of big data", International Journal of Heritage Studies 25.
- Bonacchi, C., Bevan, A., Keinan-Schoonbaert, A., Pett, D. and Wexler, J. 2019. "Participation in heritage crowdsourcing", Museum Management and Curatorship 34.
- Bonacchi, C., Altaweel, M. and Krzyzanska, M. 2018. "The heritage of Brexit: Roles of the past in the construction of political identities through social media", Journal of Social Archaeology 18. 10.1177/1469605318759713
- Bonacchi, C., Hingley, R. and Yarrow, T. 2016. "Exploring ancient identities in modern Britain". Archaeology International 19, 54–57. doi:10.5334/ai.1909
