= Edith Mary Walker =

British archaeologist (1903–1970)

Edith Mary "Molly" Walker FSA (11 December 1903–14 December 1970) was a British archaeologist.

== Biography ==
Walker was born in Leeds to parents David and Mary Elizabeth. Her father was a clergyman, variously a vicar in Burley, Darlington, and Kirkby Fleetham. In 1923 the family moved to Ripon. After her education in Polam School and Paris, her first major interest in a historical subject was with a series of 18th Century letters owned by her aunt relating to Rev George Paxton, which she transcribed for the Thoresby Society in 1936. Walker subsequently joined the Yorkshire Archaeological Society.

In 1944 she became Honorary Secretary of the Roman Antiquities Committee of the Yorkshire Archaeological Society and served in this role for ten years. Walker participated in excavations, including at Almondbury under W. J. Varley, Aldborough, and Well. Walker resigned from the Roman Antiquities Committee in May 1954 and, in April 1958, was elected as Honorary General Secretary of the Society.

Correspondence between Walker and Mary Kitson Clark is included in an archive of Clark's work at the University of Leeds. Walker is elsewhere described as a close friend of Clark, from whom she took over the role of secretary of the Roman Antiquities Section.

Walker was elected as a Fellow of the Society of Antiquaries of London in May 1949.

== Select publications ==
- Walker, E. M. (1952). Stephen Proctor; the Builder of Fountains Hall.
