= Ruth Young (archaeologist) =

Archaeologist of Egypt

Ruth Young FSA

Academic background
- Education: University of Bradford

Academic work
- Discipline: Archaeology
- Institutions: University of Leicester

Ruth Lorraine Young FSA FHEA is Professor of Archaeology at the University of Leicester.

== Career ==
Young completed undergraduate, MPhIl, and PhD studies at the University of Bradford. She was first appointed at the University of Leicester in 2000. She is a specialist in the archaeology of South Asia and the Middle East. She was elected as a Fellow of the Society of Antiquaries of London on 1 January 2010.

She has taken as interest in preserving the archaeology of Pakistan.

== Select publications ==
- Young, R. 2019. Historical Archaeology and Heritage in the Middle East. London: Routledge.
- Young, R. & Fazeli, H. 2018. "Landlord Villages of Iran as Examples of Political Economy and Materiality". Post-medieval Archaeology 52,1: 34–48.
- Newson, P. & Young, R. 2017. Post-Conflict Archaeology and Cultural Heritage. Rebuilding Knowledge, Memory and community from War-Damaged Material Culture. London: Routledge.
- Brooks. A. & Young, R. 2016. "Historical Archaeology and Heritage in the Middle East: A Preliminary Overview". Historical Archaeology 50(4):22–35.
- Newson, P. & Young, R. 2015. "The archaeology of conflict damaged sites: Hosn Niha in the Biq'a Valley, Lebanon". Antiquity 89, 344: 449–463.
- Coningham, R. & Young, R. 2015. The Archaeology of South Asia. From the Indus to Asoka, c.6500 BCE to 200 CE. Cambridge: Cambridge University Press.
- Young, R. 2003. Agriculture and Pastoralism in the Late Bronze and Early Iron Age, North West Frontier Province, Pakistan. Oxford: BAR. S1124.
