= Charles Shepard (artist) =

English artist and sculptor (1892–1976)

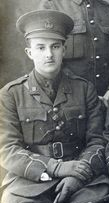
- Charles Shepard in 1914
- Born: Joseph Charles Mardel Shepard; 10 April 1892; Kingsthorpe
- Died: 13 December 1976 (aged 84); Slough
- Occupation: Visual artist, sculptor
- Awards: Fellow of the Society of Antiquaries

Charles Shepard (Note: His surname is often misspelled as Sheperd or Shepherd.), FSA (1892–1976) was an English artist and sculptor, best known for his work, as Shep, designing commercial posters, especially for the travel industry.

== Early life ==
Joseph Charles Mardel Shepard was born in Kingsthorpe, Northamptonshire, on 10 April 1892. In childhood he heard a performance of a Bach cantata in church, and during it was impressed by the light coming through the church transept's stained glass windows. This led, once his schooling was complete, to his studying stained glass making under Paul Woodroffe.

== Career ==
A 1936 poster for the Southern Railway and Southampton Docks, signed "Shep" and printed by the Baynard Press.

Shepard was commissioned into the 3rd (Special Reserve) Battalion, the Essex Regiment on 7 March 1913, prior to the start of World War I. On the outbreak of the war he was attached to the 2nd Battalion, and was promoted to Lieutenant on 2 February 1915. By the end of the war he was attached to 1st Garrison Battalion, the Northamptonshire Regiment. He resigned his commission on grounds on ill-health on 18 December 1926. He held the rank of Temporary Captain while commandant of a prisoner-of-war camp, relinquishing this on 1 March 1919.

After the war, he obtained an assistant's position at the Baynard Press, eventually rising to be head of the studio.

Among others, he designed posters for British Railways, London North Eastern Railway, London Transport, Pullman, the Orient Line, the Royal Horticultural Society, the Royal Mail Steam Packet Company, the Southern Railway, Union-Castle Line, United States Lines, and White Star Line. He also designed the cover of the 1929 Christmas edition of The Radio Times. He signed most of these works "SHEP".

He painted a headpiece, in oils, for the Southern Railway's indicator board at Southampton Docks.

During World War II Shepard was commissioned into the Royal Air Force Volunteer Reserve's Administrative and Special Duties Branch as a Pilot Officer on 22 June 1940. He was promoted to Flying Officer on 22 July 1941. An erroneous report that he had resigned his commission on 21 July 1942 was cancelled on 15 September 1942. He relinquished his commission from the RAFVR, on 10 February 1954, keeping the rank of Flight Officer.

He was appointed a Fellow of the Society of Antiquaries of London in February 1945.

In 1961, when he described himself as an "artist, designer and sculptor", Shepard's working address was given as Slough.

== Legacy ==
Shepard died at Slough on 13 December 1976, aged 84. (Note: Some sources wrongly give a death date of 1962)

His posters are held by the Victoria and Albert Museum, Science Museum Group, and London Transport Museum. The latter also has some of his correspondence. Other posters have been auctioned by Bonhams and Christie's.
