= Kayt Hawkins =

British archaeologist

Kathryn "Kayt" Hawkins (formerly Marter-Brown) FSA MCIfA is a British archaeologist.

== Biography ==
Hawkins is an Iron Age and Romano-British pottery specialist who has worked in developer led archaeology in the UK since 1988. She has an BA in archaeology from University of Winchester (1995) and a MSc in Archaeomaterials from University of Sheffield (1996). She has worked for numerous archaeological organisations in the South East of England including Surrey County Archaeological Unit (2014-2019) and is currently at Archaeology South-East at UCL Institute of Archaeology. Hawkins wrote the RESPECT guidelines on behalf of British Archaeological Jobs & Resources for tackling sexual harassment in archaeology.

She was elected as a Fellow of the Society of Antiquaries of London in October 2020.

Hawkins has been involved with the Chartered Institute for Archaeologists since the 1990s, as Hon Vice Chair for Personnel and Membership (1999-2001), Advisory Council Member (2016-2021), a co-opted Board member (2024) and has been actively involved in Finds Special Interest Group Committee.

She is also the Secretary and Member of the Study Group for Roman Pottery.

== Select publications ==
- Boughton, D. and Hawkins, K. (eds) 2022. Back in the Bag: Essays exploring artefacts in honour of David Wynn Williams. Portslade, SpoilHeap Publications.
- Hawkins, K. 2020. "The Finds group at 30: celebrating the past, reviewing the present, planning the future", The Archaeologist 110, 22–23.
- Hawkins, K and Rees, C. 2021 "Reporting Bullying and Sexual Harassment: a workplace survey by BAJR Respect", British Archaeological Jobs & Resources (9 January 2021).
- Jones, P. and Hawkins, K. 2019. "The Pottery", in Marples, N. and Poulton, R. Prehistoric and early medieval landscapes at North Park Farm, Bletchingley, Surrey (Monograph 21). SpoilHeap Publications, 132–149.
- Hawkins, K. and Rees, C. 2018. "RESPECT: Acting against harassment in archaeology", British Archaeological Jobs Resource Guide No.44.
- Anderson, K., Woolhouse, T., Marter-Brown, K., and Quinn, P. 2016. "Continental Potters? First-Century Roman Flagon Production at Duxford, Cambridgeshire". Britannia 47, 43-69 doi:10.1017/S0068113X16000052.
