= The Stonemason (book) =

2020 non-fiction book by Andrew Ziminski

The Stonemason: A History of Building Britain
- Author: Andrew Ziminski FSA
- Illustrator: Clare Venables
- Publisher: John Murray
- Publication date: 5 March 2020
- Publication place: United Kingdom
- Pages: 366
- ISBN: 978-1473699762
- Website: www.the-stonemason.co.uk

The Stonemason: A History of Building Britain is a book written by Andrew Ziminski, published by John Murray in 2020. The book is divided into four parts, combining a chronological and geological approach, with each part concentrating on a single type of stone and how it is used in a particular architectural style and period. Partly an autobiography, the book features examples that are principally drawn from the author's own work in an area broadly corresponding to Wessex, and chapters are arranged to reflect the passage of a single year, beginning and ending at Samhain. Each chapter is preceded by a linocut print produced by Clare Venables.

The first part, "Sarsen", describes the Neolithic structures around Avebury and Stonehenge, beginning at West Kennet Long Barrow. This is followed by "Limestone", which describes the Roman baths of Aquae Sulis and some surviving Anglo-Saxon churches, such as St Laurence's Church, Bradford-on-Avon. "Marble" considers the rise of Gothic architecture, and the influence of Purbeck Marble, which like other types of Purbeck stone is in fact a type of limestone. Finally "Concrete" discusses the influence of the Industrial Revolution on architecture around Bath, Somerset, and particularly the role played by the Kennet and Avon Canal and the Great Western Railway.

As well as being a working stonemason, Ziminski is a William Morris Craft Fellow at the Society for the Protection of Ancient Buildings, and a Fellow of the Society of Antiquaries of London.

Ziminski's second book, Church Going, his guide to the history and architecture of churches in Britain, was announced in March 2023 and published in October 2024.

== Reviews ==
The book has received many positive reviews. In The Daily Telegraph Christopher Howse writes that "The mark of Ziminski's approach is that he knows what he is doing" and that "Ziminski is no mere recorder of impressions. He brings plenty of helpful information from history, geology and architecture." In The Sunday Telegraph Robert Leigh-Pemberton compares Ziminski to William Morris, concluding that "Ziminski is undertaking something more profound than the charm of this delightful book first suggests."

In The Spectator Harry Mount notes his "unparalleled understanding of this country's stones", while in Literary Review Will Wiles emphasises "the remarkable way that Ziminski weaves together architecture, craft, landscape, archaeology and natural history". In History Today Gillian Darley describes Ziminski as "thoughtful, observant and well-informed", while in The Times Literary Supplement Emma Wells writes that "Absorbing and engaging, The Stonemason perfectly captures the genius loci of the British landscape and its ancient buildings."

In The Times Jonathan Morrison praises the book as "uncompromisingly learned" and containing "moments of great lyricism", but notes that "the greatest regret is that you do not emerge feeling that you understand the stonemason's craft that much better". However, he concludes that "Ziminski fills you afresh with a longing to visit one of the most extraordinary regions in the world". Writing in the Evening Standard, Julian Glover describes the book as "compelling", "rooted in the making of England", and "a magical read".
