= Sarah Jennings (archaeologist) =

Archaeologist (1947–2009)

Sarah Jennings, FSA (1947–2009) was an archaeologist specialising in the study of pottery and glass. She worked at the Passmore Edwards Museum, York Archaeological Trust, and from 1992 she was employed by English Heritage as an archaeologist. Her later research focused on Roman and early Byzantine glass. The Medieval Pottery Research Group and the Association for the History of Glass jointly held a conference in Jenning's honour in 2012. A festschrift was published in her honour in 2019, titled Ceramics & Glass: a tribute to Sarah Jennings.
