= Department of Archaeology, University of York =

University department

Department of Archaeology
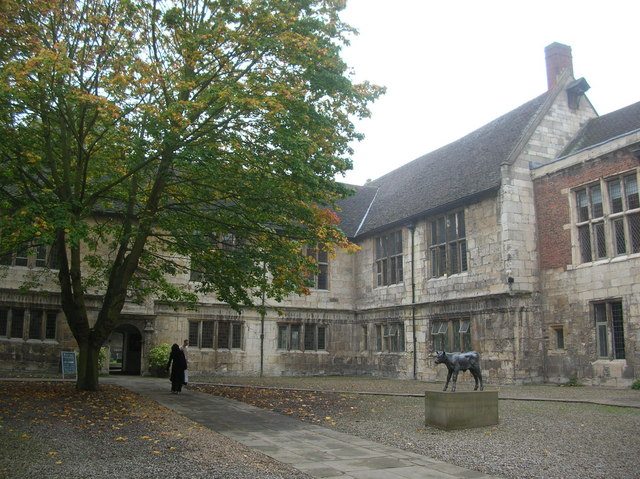
- The main courtyard at King's Manor
- Type: Academic department
- Established: 1978
- Affiliations: University of York
- Head of Department: Stephanie Wynne-Jones
- Academic staff: 28
- Undergraduates: 300
- Postgraduates: 100
- Location: York, Yorkshire, England; 53.9624°N 1.0865°W
- Website: www.york.ac.uk/archaeology

The Department of Archaeology at the University of York, England, is a department which provides undergraduate and postgraduate courses in archaeology and its sub-disciplines and conducts associated research. It was founded in 1978 and has grown from a small department based at Micklegate House to more than a hundred undergraduate students based at King's Manor and with scientific facilities at the BioArCh centre on the main campus.

== Hosted organisations, research specialities and fieldwork ==
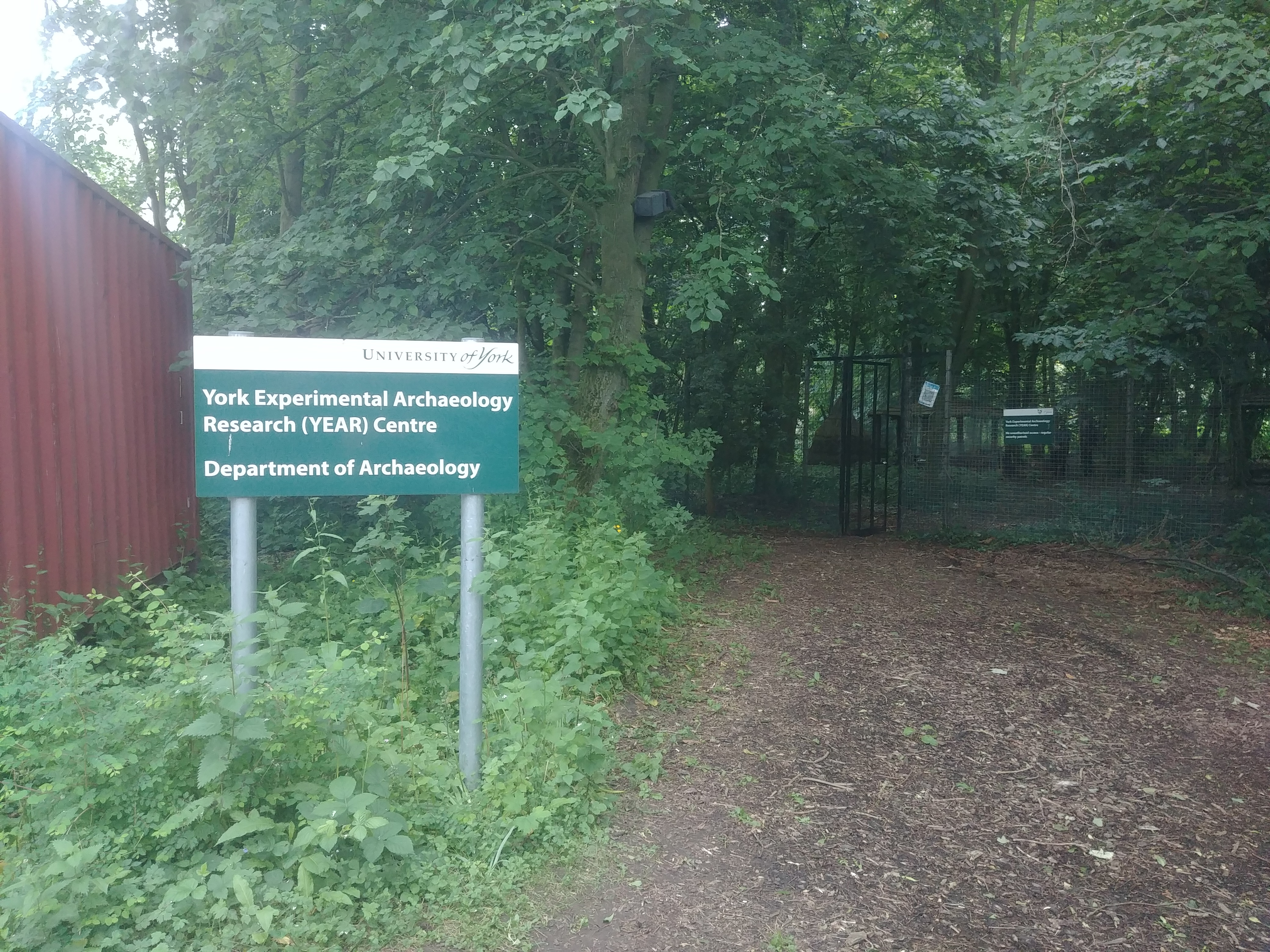
YEAR Centre, University of York

The archaeology department hosts several specialist organisations:

- Archaeology Data Service - an open access digital archive for archaeological research outputs
- Internet Archaeology - a fully peer-reviewed electronic journal for archaeology
- BioArCh - a specialist centre using scientific and molecular techniques for archaeology
- York Experimental Archaeology Research (YEAR) Centre
- Centre for Digital Heritage - an interdisciplinary centre studying computer-based approaches to heritage. Working with the universities of Aarhus (Denmark), Leiden (Netherlands), Lund (Sweden), Uppsala (Sweden).
- The Post Hole - is an archaeology journal run by students.

The department's faculty has led significant archaeological investigations across Great Britain and occasionally further afield

Site	Image	Location	Period(s)	Director(s)	Years excavated
Star Carr		North Yorkshire	Mesolithic	Chantal Conneller (Manchester) Nicky Milner, Barry Taylor (Chester)	2003-2015
Castell Henllys		Pembrokeshire	Iron Age	Harold Mytum	
Sutton Hoo		Suffolk	Anglo-Saxon	Martin Carver	1983-1992
Wharram Percy		East Yorkshire	Medieval	Philip Rahtz (among others)	1950-1990

== History ==
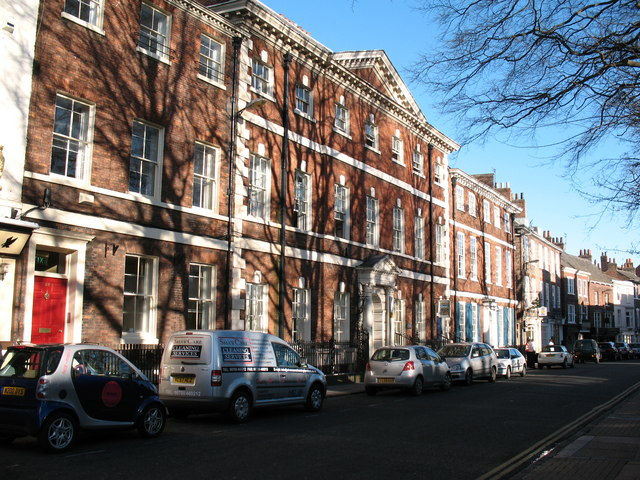
Micklegate House; the department's first building

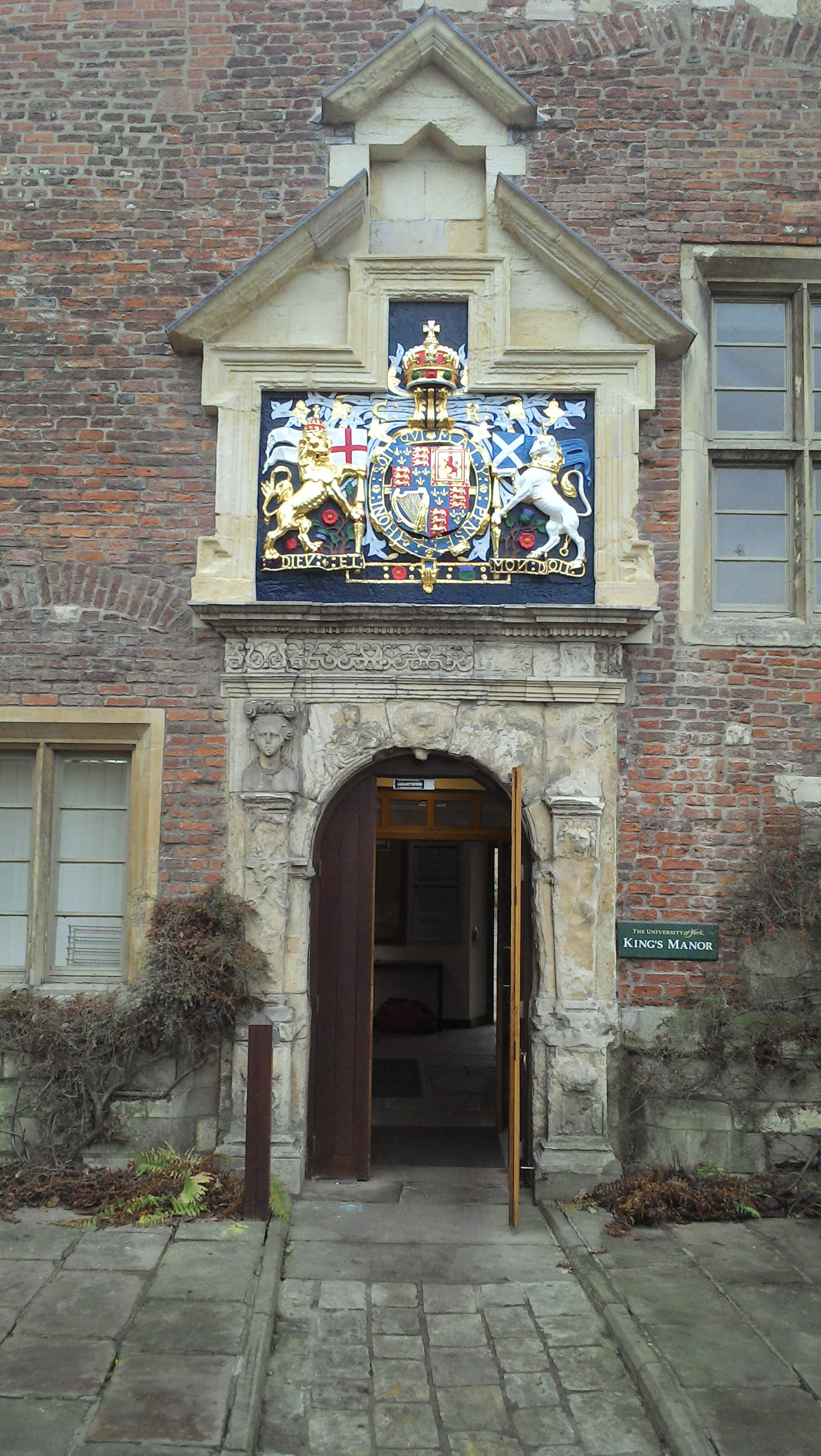
The main entrance to King's Manor.

The department opened in 1978, 15 years after the university itself. The first head of department, Philip Rahtz built a thematic undergraduate programme specialising in the British Middle Ages. The programme included a 12-week field course in archaeological excavation. The department expanded under Martin Carver after his appointment in 1986. A postgraduate programme was added and the department moved to King's Manor. Subsequently, the department has grown in numbers of students, staff and the diversity of its specialisms: adding environmental archaeology, prehistory, computational archaeology, archaeological science and cultural heritage management.

== Academics ==
- Stephanie Wynne-Jones (head of department)
- Michelle Alexander
- Penny Bickle
- Maureen Carroll
- Dawn Hadley
- Malin Holst
- Aleksandra McClain
- Nicky Milner
- Julian D. Richards

Honorary and visiting staff:

- Joann Fletcher
- Dominic Powlesland
- Sadie Watson

=== Former academics ===
Heads of department:

- Philip Rahtz - 1978-1986
- Martin Carver - 1986-1996
- Jane Grenville - 2001-2006
- Julian D. Richards - 2006-2012
- John Schofield - 2011-2018
- Nicky Milner - 2018-2025

== Alumni ==
- Ken Dark, archaeologist : BA Archaeology, 1982
- Helen Geake, archaeologist : DPhil Archaeology, 1991
- Roberta Gilchrist, archaeologist : DPhil Archaeology, 1989
- Greg Jenner - Historical Consultant to CBBC's 'Horrible Histories'
- Leen Ritmeyer, archaeologist : MA Conservation Studies
- Ben Robinson, The Flying Archaeologist (BBC Series) : PhD Archaeology

== Rankings and awards ==
Amongst archaeology departments, York ranked 2nd for Impact, 2nd equal for Environment, and 4th overall in the 2014 Research Assessment Exercise. In the 2015 University Subject Tables, the department was ranked 6th out of 40 with a score of 92.6%. The department was awarded the Queen's Anniversary Prize for Higher and Further Education in 2011
