= Star Carr Frontlets =

Mesolithic relics, North Yorkshire, UK

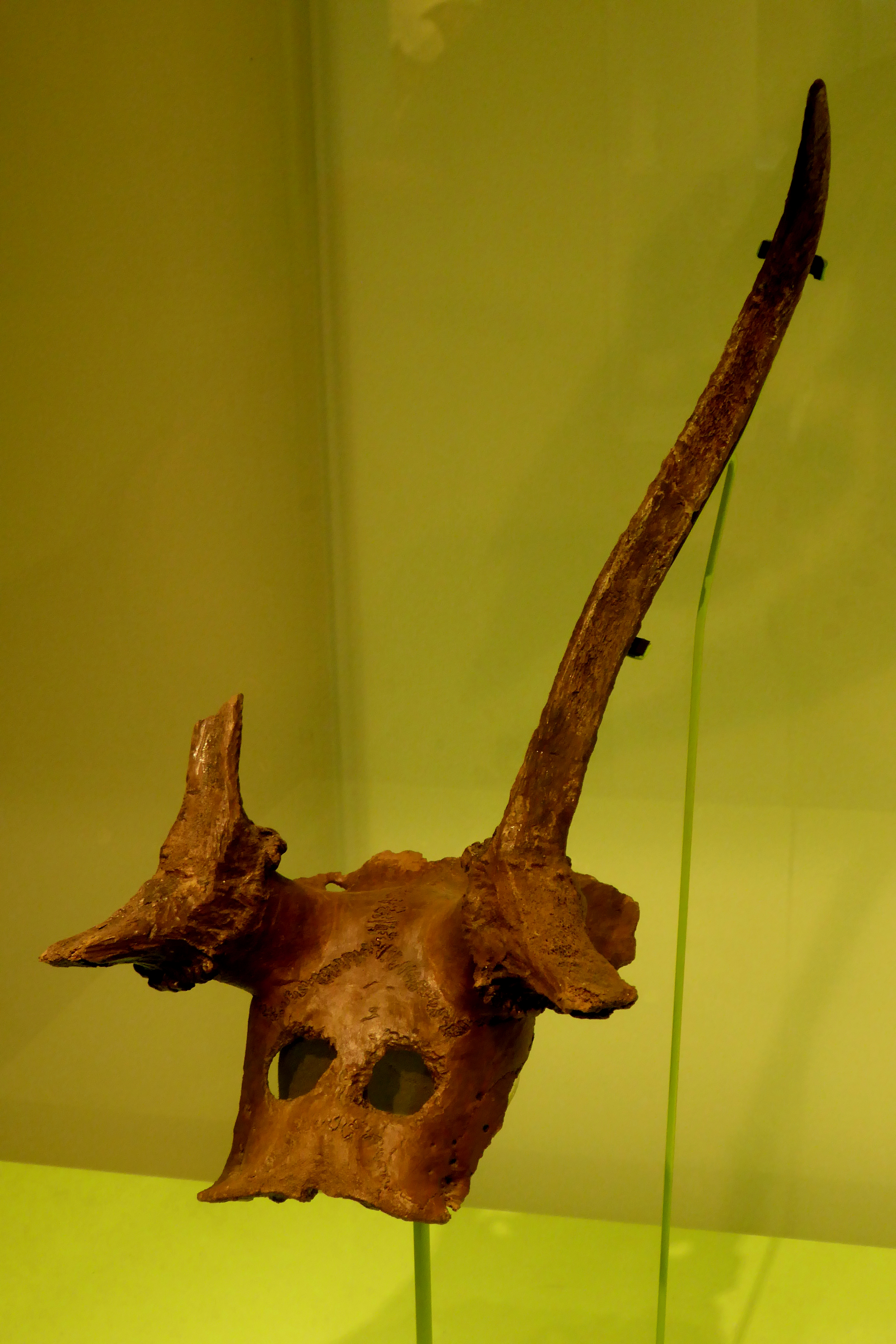
Mesolithic deer skull from Star Carr

The Star Carr Frontlets (also known as the Star Carr Headdresses) are a series of modified deer skulls, probably worn by people, from the Mesolithic site at Star Carr in North Yorkshire.

== Discovery ==
The site at Star Carr was first excavated in 1949 by Grahame Clark. He found the first headdresses at this time and their discovery was published in the 1954 monograph Excavations At Star Carr: An Early Mesolithic Site at Seamer Near Scarborough, Yorkshire. A total of 21 headdresses made from red deer skulls were found in this excavation and these were donated to the British Museum, Museum of Archaeology and Anthropology, University of Cambridge, and the Rotunda Museum. A later series of excavations led by Nicky Milner, Chantal Conneller, and Barry Taylor from 2004 to 2010 and then 2013–2015 discovered a further twelve red deer frontlets as well as some roe deer examples.

Since the first discoveries at Star Carr, antler frontlets have been found at ten prehistoric sites in northern Europe.

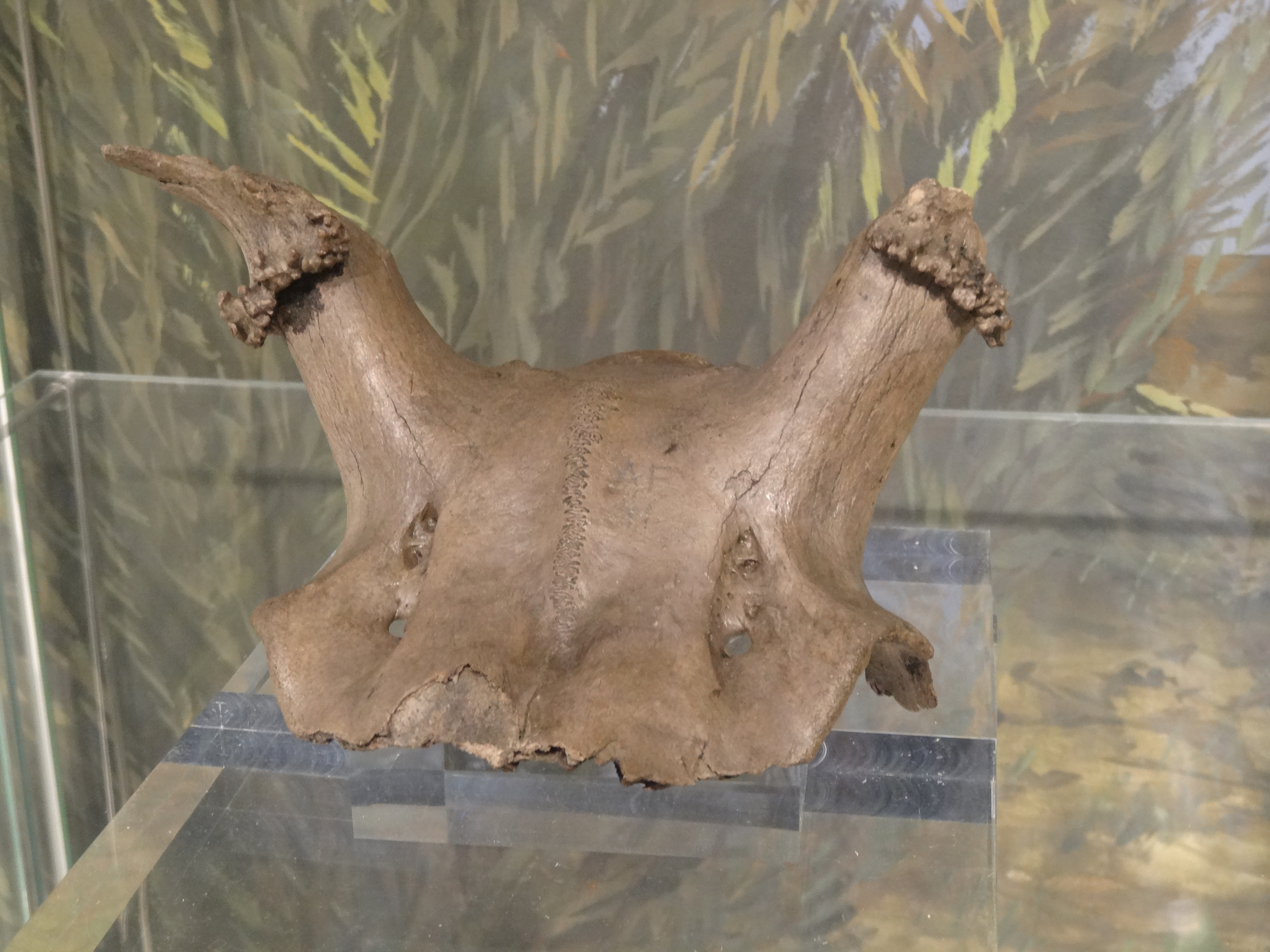

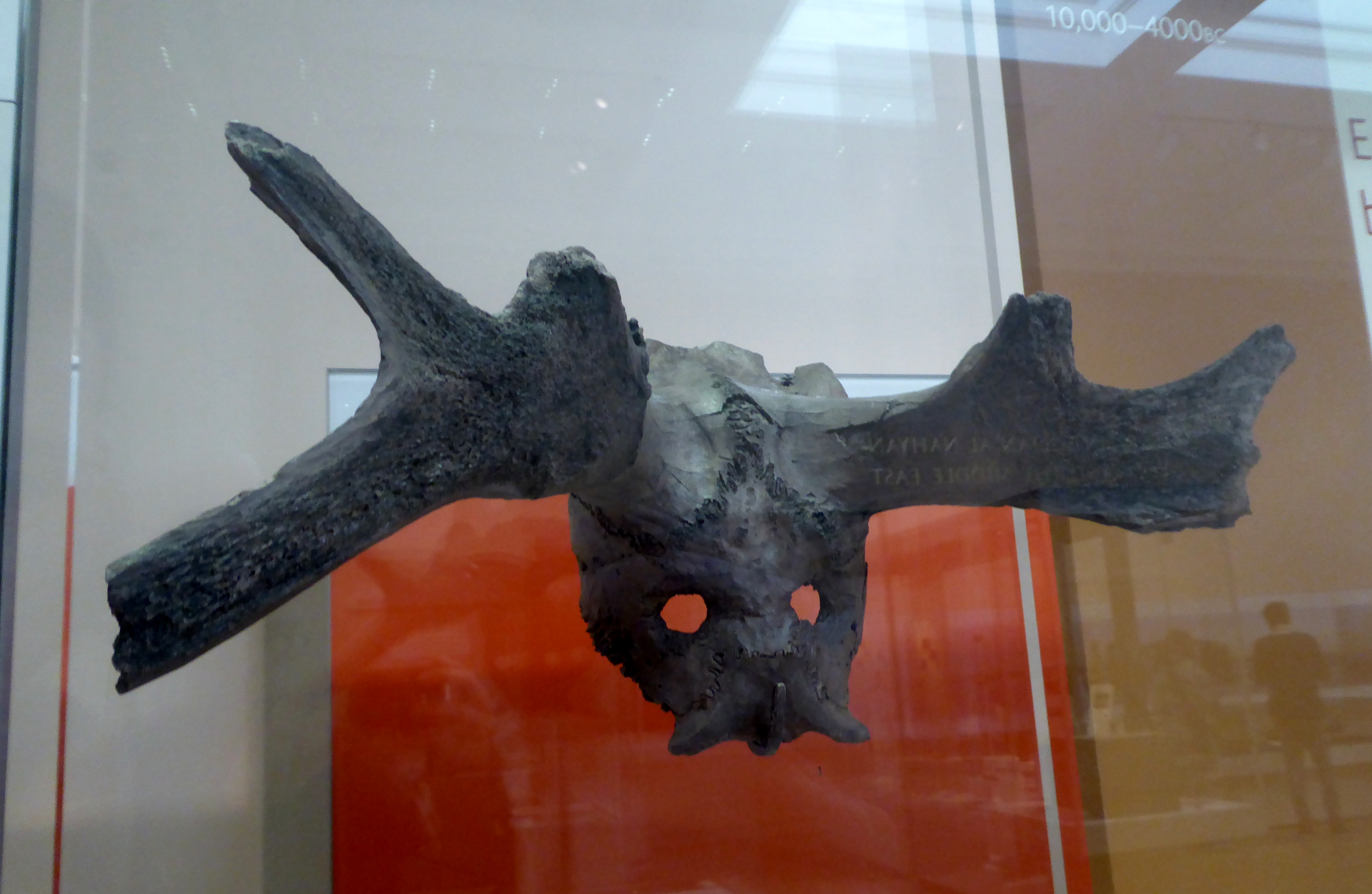

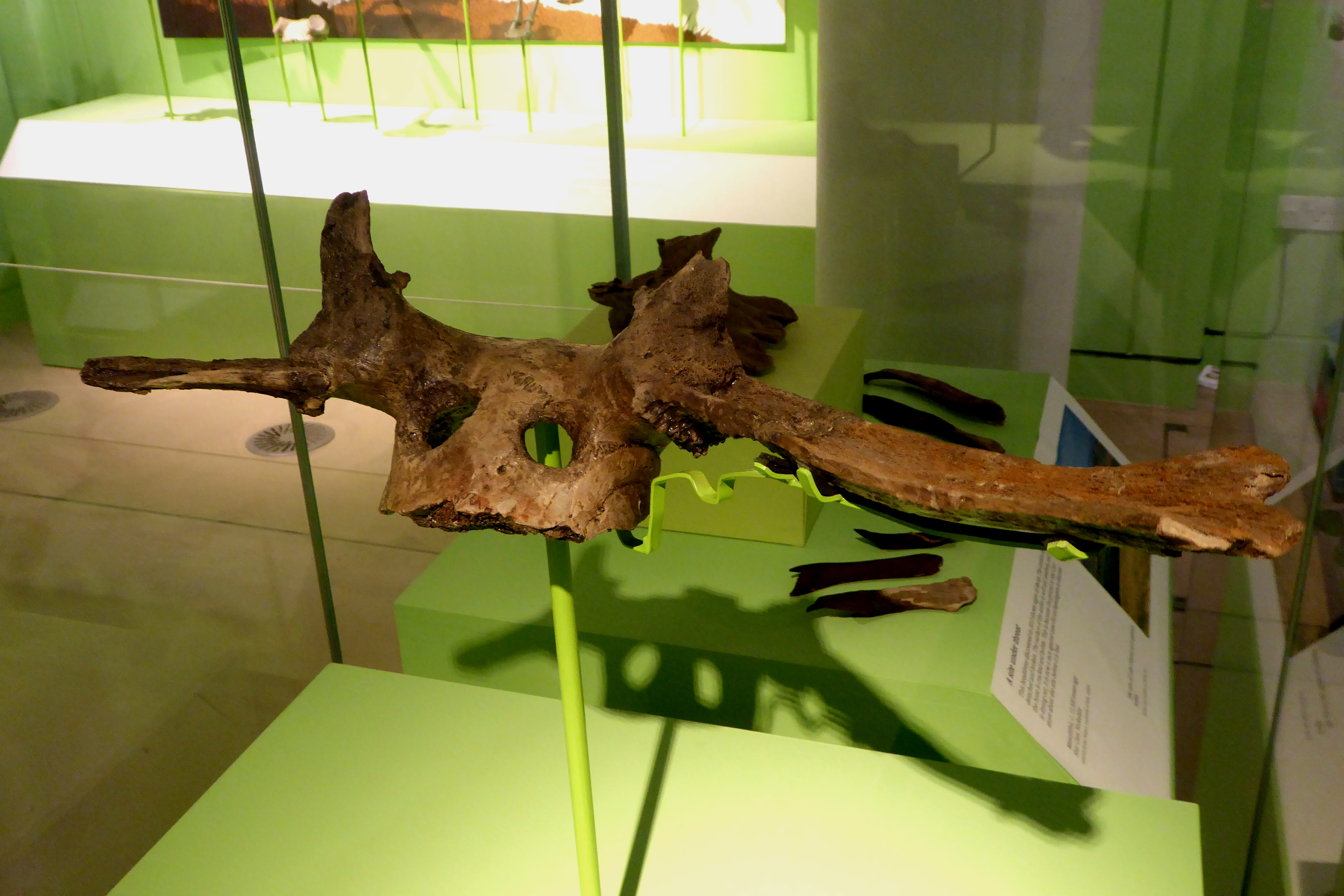

== Creation ==
A 2016 scientific paper published in PLOS ONE, and led by Aimée Little, discussed a technological analysis of creating a red deer headdress. In it, the authors summarised a manufacturing sequence of a headdress: "a mature red deer male was killed in autumn or winter before the antlers were shed. The head was removed, probably superficially cleaned, before work commenced on producing the headdress. The first stage of the process may have been focused on the beams to remove a large amount of antler, some of which may have formed 'blanks' for the production of barbed projectile tips which were then used to hunt and fish... at this point there are two diverging hypotheses: a tool was used to chop through the skin, initiating the de-skinning process; or the skin was left on, the upper half of the cranium covered with damp clay, before being placed into the embers of a fire. The skull was subsequently retrieved, and the charred bone removed using a small hammerstone. After removing the clay, the skin (if remaining) was peeled away from the frontal and parietal bones...Perforations on each side of the cranium were made using a hand-held flint core tool."

== Function ==
The frontlets have been interpreted as functioning as headdresses based on the reduction of the antlers to make them lighter, the inclusion of perforations for a strap or cord to be attached, and the smoothing of the interior of the braincase for a more comfortable fit on a human head. In his original 1954 work Clark also suggested that they could have functioned as disguises for hunting deer or as costumes for ritualised dancing. Conneller argued that the headdresses could have "facilitated a bodily transformation". She argues that this was not a literal transformation into deer, but something that affected change in a human by taking on the effects of an animal.

== Public dissemination ==
=== Museums ===
Frontlets have been on public display in museums where they are held. Perhaps the most famous frontlet, in the British Museum, has frequently been on display in that museum and elsewhere. In 2006–2007 it was in the Westfalisches Museum für Archäologie (Bonn, Germany). In 2012 it featured in the Shakespeare: Staging the World exhibition at the British Museum, and then was again exhibited there in 2022 during The World of Stonehenge exhibition.

A frontlet is in the collection of the Rotunda Museum, where it is in public display.

The frontlet in the collection of the Museum of Archaeology and Anthropology was recently on display in an exhibition titled A Survival Story: prehistoric life at Star Carr (21 June 2018 – 19 April 2020) along with a headdress from the recent excavations.

The frontlets discovered in the 2004–2015 excavations are in the collection of the Yorkshire Museum. Four frontlets went on display as part of the After the Ice: Yorkshire's Prehistoric People exhibition in 2012. A large group of frontlets were displayed from March 2024 to May 2026 in the Star Carr: Life after the Ice exhibition at the museum. Three frontlets from the Yorkshire Museum collection were included in the Die Schamanin exhibition at the Halle State Museum of Prehistory from March 2026 and were exhibited alongside the Bad Dürrenberg burial and the Berlin-Biesdorf deer antler mask.

=== Stamp ===
In 2017 Royal Mail issued a £1.05 stamp featuring a person wearing one of the Star Carr Frontlets.

== See also ==
- Berlin-Biesdorf deer antler mask
