= Lacey Wallace =

Museum curator

Lacey Wallace FSA
- Born: 1983 (age 42–43)

Academic work
- Discipline: Archaeology
- Sub-discipline: Roman archaeology
- Institutions: University of Cambridge; University of Lincoln

Lacey M Wallace FSA is an archaeologist and Senior Lecturer in Roman History and Material Culture at the University of Lincoln.

== Biography ==
Wallace completed undergraduate studies at Boston University in 2004 before attending Queens' College, Cambridge to complete her PhD in archaeology in 2011. She worked as a research associate in Roman archaeology at Cambridge (2013-2016) before joining the University of Lincoln in 2016. Wallace was elected as a fellow of the Society of Antiquaries of London on 26 June 2021.

== Select publications ==
- Gardner, Andrew and Wallace, Lacey. 2020. "Making space for past futures: rural landscape temporalities in Roman Britain". Cambridge Archaeological Journal, 30 (2), 327–342.
- Wallace, Lacey and Mullen, Alex. 2019. "Landscape, Monumentality, and Expression of Group identities in Iron Age and Roman east Kent", Britannia, 1-34.
- Weekes, Jake, Watson, Sadie, Wallace, Lacey, Mazzilli, Francesca, Gardner, Andrew and Alberti, Marta. 2019. "Alienation and Redemption: the praxis of (Roman) archaeology in Britain". Theoretical Roman Archaeology Journal, 2 (1), 1–17.
- Wallace, Lacey. 2018. "Community and the creation of provincial identities: a re-interpretation of the aisled building at North Warnborough", The Archaeological Journal, 175 (2), 231–254.
- Dobinson, Colin, Ferraby, Rose, Lucas, Jason, Millett, Martin and Wallace, Lacey. 2018. "Archaeological Field Survey in the Environs of Aldborough (Isurium Brigantum)". Yorkshire Archaeological Journal 90, 29–58.
- Wallace, Lacey, Mullen, Alex, Johnson, Paul and Verdonck, Lieven. 2016. "Archaeological Investigations at Bourne Park, Bishopsbourne, 2011-2014". Archaeologia Cantiana 137, 251–280.
