= Powlesland =

Powlesland is a surname of English origin. People with that name include:

- Dominic Powlesland (born 1954), British landscape archaeologist
- Ian Powlesland, British archaeologist who appeared in the TV series Time Team

== See also ==
- Powlesland and Mason (railway shunting contractors), a defunct company once active in Swansea docks
