= Star Carr Pendant =

Shale pendant from Mesolithic site in North Yorkshire, England

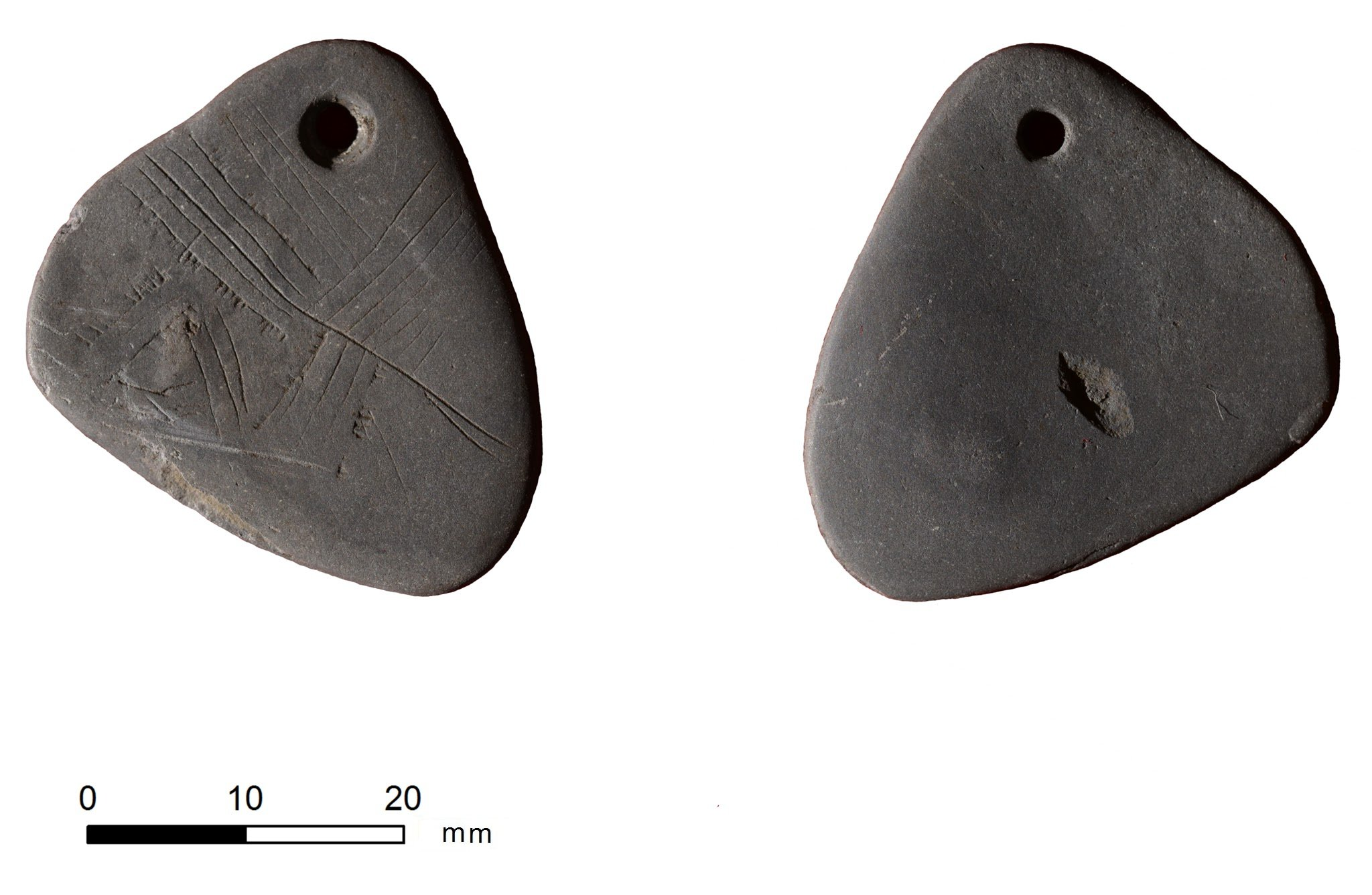
- Star Carr pendant, front and back
- Material: Shale
- Height: 3.1 cm
- Width: 3.5 cm
- Created: c. 8500 BC
- Discovered: 2015; Star Carr, North Yorkshire, England; 54°12′51″N 00°25′24″W
- Discovered by: Tom Bell
- Present location: Yorkshire Museum

The Star Carr Pendant is a unique engraved shale pendant from the Mesolithic site of Star Carr in North Yorkshire, England. It has been described as the oldest Mesolithic art in Britain.

== Discovery ==
The pendant was found in 2015 by a team from the University of York during excavations led by Nicky Milner. It was excavated by Tom Bell, a student from the University of Chester on the last days of the excavation. It was found in a context from the edge of the palaeolake Lake Flixton.

== Description ==
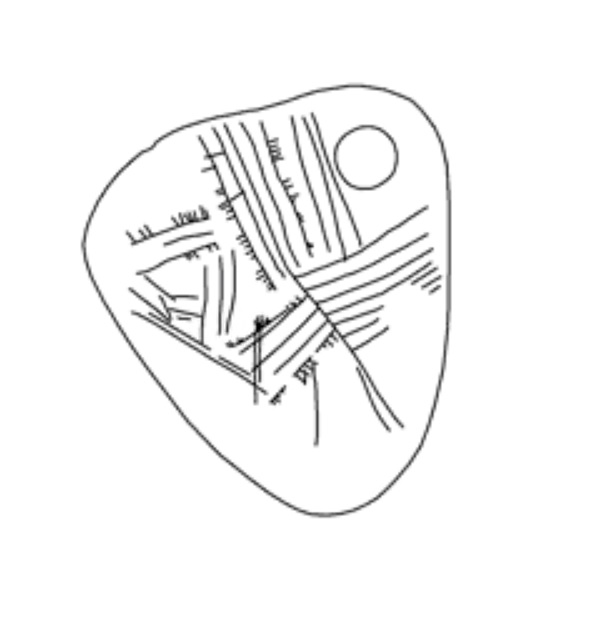

The pendant is sub-triangular in shape and measures 31 mm x 35 mm x 3 mm. ED-XRF (energy-dispersive X-ray fluorescence) was used to prove that it is made from shale. The front face is engraved with a series of parallel, incised lines which often cross each other. It has a perforation, made by drilling through from the engraved side at one of the lobes.

On the reverse side to the engraving there is a nick caused by a missing flake of shale in the central region. This may have happened accidentally or intentionally, presumably by something hard striking this surface before it was deposited in the lake.

== Significance ==
The pendant is unique and is the earliest example of Mesolithic art in Britain. Whilst it is very similar to a number of other pendants from northern European sites, this pendant is unique as it is made from shale, whereas the other examples tend to be crafted from amber. It is also one of the few decorated pendants that have been found within an archaeological context and not as a stray find. Analysis by the research team suggest that there are two phases of markings on the pendant, and that it is possible that more than one person added to it over time. Different interpretations from those who have seen the engravings have suggested that it may represent a tree, a map, a leaf, tally marks, even a representation of the wooden platforms which have been found at Star Carr.

== Public display ==
The pendant is now in the Yorkshire Museum and first went on public display in February 2016.
