= Ben Robinson (archaeologist) =

British archaeologist and television presenter

Ben Robinson is a British archaeologist and television presenter who currently works for Historic England. He has appeared as a contributor and presenter for Channel 4, ITV and the BBC.

== History ==
Robinson obtained a BSc (Hons) in Computer Science from Teesside University (Polytechnic at the time) in 1989. He achieved his PhD at the University of York in 2008 while working for Peterborough City Council as the Historic Environment Manager. In 2009 Robinson joined English Heritage as a Team Leader and Inspector of Ancient Monuments. Robinson has worked for Historic England since the 2015 split of English Heritage as the Principal Adviser, Heritage at Risk for the East Midlands.

== Television work ==
Robinson first appeared on the Channel 4 programme Time Team in 2005, on a dig at Northborough, and went on to make a further eleven appearances, with his last in 2011 at Litlington, Cambridgeshire.

Robinson appeared on the episode "East" of the 2009 BBC One programme Rivers with Griff Rhys Jones. In 2010 he presented the four-part BBC Four series The Flying Archaeologist.

During 2014 he presented the episode "The Zeppelin Terror" for the BBC Four documentary World War One At Home. In the episode he followed the paths of the Zeppelin attacks over the East of England. Also in 2014, Robinson co-presented the ITV series Secrets from the Sky with historian Bettany Hughes.

In 2015 Robinson co-presented the BBC One documentary The Last Journey of the Magna Carta King with Professor Stephen Church. In 2018 he joined presenter Alice Roberts in the six-part Channel 4 programme Britain's Most Historic Towns.

In 2019 Robinson fronted the BBC Four series Pubs, Ponds and Power: The Story of the Village, a six-part programme documenting the history of the English village in various regions. This was followed by the similar format, Villages by the Sea later in 2019, which has gone onto a further three series.
