= Jane Grenville =

British archaeologist

- Born: Jane Clare Grenville; 17 June 1958 (age 68)
- Citizenship: United Kingdom

Academic background
- Education: Girton College, Cambridge; University of York

Academic work
- Discipline: Archaeology
- Sub-discipline: Medieval archaeology; archaeology of buildings; conservation
- Institutions: Council for British Archaeology; University of York

Jane Clare Grenville, OBE, FSA (born 17 June 1958) is a British archaeologist and academic, specialising in the archaeology of medieval buildings. Her early career was in field archaeology, heritage, and building conservation. In 1991, she joined the University of York as a lecturer in archaeology. She served as Pro-Vice-Chancellor for Students from 2007 to 2015 and Deputy Vice-Chancellor from 2012 to 2015: she was acting Vice-Chancellor in 2013.

== Early life and education ==
Grenville was born 17 June 1958 to Henry William Grenville and Helen Caroline Grenville (née Westmacott). Her father had escaped from Nazi Germany as a child via the Kindertransport. She studied archaeology and anthropology at Girton College, Cambridge, graduating with a Bachelor of Arts (BA) degree in 1983: as per tradition, her BA was promoted to a Master of Arts (MA Cantab) degree. While at Cambridge, she served as president of the University of Cambridge Archaeological Field Club (AFC). Having completed her undergraduate degree, she began a Doctor of Philosophy (PhD) degree at the University of Cambridge but abandoned it a year later. She completed a PhD by publication at the University of York in 2005.

== Career ==
As a field archaeologist, Grenville has undertaken excavations in the United Kingdom, France, the Netherlands, Cyprus, Crete, Syria, and Libya. From 1984 to 1987, she was a field worker on the Listed Buildings Resurvey for Yorkshire and Humberside. Next, from 1987 to 1988, she was a researcher on the Chester Rows Research Project. She was then an Historic Buildings Officer with the Council for British Archaeology between 1988 and 1991.

In 1991, she joined the University of York as a lecturer in archaeology. She was promoted to senior lecturer in 2000. She was Head of its Department of Archaeology between 2001 and 2006. She served as Pro-Vice-Chancellor for Students from 2007 to 2015 and Deputy Vice-Chancellor from 2012 to 2015: she was acting Vice-Chancellor, the university's most senior academic and chief executive, in 2013. She retired from full-time academia in 2015, and was appointed an honorary research fellow by the university.

Outside of academia, she has held a number of related appointments. From 2001 to 2008, she was a Commissioner of English Heritage. She has been a trustee of the York Civic Trust since 2006, and was one of the York Museums Trust between 2008 and 2011. From 2013 to 2016, she was the Chair of Trustees of the Council for British Archaeology. Since 2016, she has been a member of the Fabric Advisory Committee of York Minster.

== Honours ==
On 4 July 2002, Grenville was elected a Fellow of the Society of Antiquaries of London (FSA). In the 2014 Queen's Birthday Honours, she was appointed an Officer of the Order of the British Empire (OBE) for services to higher education.

== Selected works ==
- Grenville, Jane (1997). Medieval housing. London: Leicester University Press. ISBN 978-0718514785.
- Grenwille, Jane, ed. (1998). Managing the historic rural landscape. London: Routledge. ISBN 978-0415207904.
