= Dominic Powlesland =

British landscape archaeologist

- Born: 12 November 1954 (age 71); Romford, Essex, England
- Known for: Long-term landscape investigation of the Vale of Pickering, Computational archaeology
- Awards: Fellow of the Society of Antiquaries of London (2007)
- Scientific career
- Fields: Landscape Archaeology
- Institutions: Landscape Research Centre, University of York, University of Leeds

Dominic Powlesland, FSA (born 1954) is a British landscape archaeologist based in North Yorkshire. He has contributed to the methodologies of field archaeology and landscape survey, particularly geophysics and the use of computers when recording and processing archaeological data. He is the director of the Landscape Research Centre and visiting professor at the universities of York, Leeds, Huddersfield and Vienna.

== Early life ==
Powlesland was born in Romford (Essex) and began participating in archaeological excavations aged 11 in Colchester and continued through his teenage years.

== Career ==
Powlesland's archaeological work has focused on the Vale of Pickering in Yorkshire. He has been working on this landscape since 1977, not only recording the archaeology but pioneering investigation techniques and methods that have influenced the discipline internationally. These include several major excavation projects and landscape investigations using geophysics, aerial photography and field survey methods. In 1984 Powlesland consolidated his team into the Landscape Research Centre, a charitable trust "dedicated to undertaking and disseminating archaeological research at a landscape scale".

=== West Heslerton ===
The West Heslerton project focused on the excavation of over 20 hectares (49 acres) of Anglo-Saxon settlement and cemetery. It was one of the largest and most detailed archaeological investigations ever conducted, recording more than 300,000 artefacts in three dimensions and comprehensively recording occupations from prehistory to well after the Anglo-Saxon occupation.

=== Landscape archaeology ===
Powlesland has advocated a detailed, landscape-scale approach to archaeology, arguing that studying sites in isolation misses the 'connective tissue' of past landscapes. The Landscape Research Centre has carried out this approach; for example studying 400 hectares (990 acres) of Vale of Pickering with geophysics, topographic and aerial survey, and the use of soil sampling for sediments and finds. The Heslerton Parish Project studied 10 square kilometres (3.9 sq mi) around the village of West Heslerton in order to set the excavations in context. It included multi-spectral aerial photography and geophysical magnetometer survey.

=== Computing and archaeology ===
Powlesland was an early adopter of computers as part of the archaeological recording process - beginning by writing his own programs for a Wang 2200 in 1982. Digital methods for recording, processing, analysing and presenting the results of archaeological research were developed and tested by Powlesland and his team throughout various projects. His work has been lauded by others in the field, particularly for the detailed three-dimensional recording of artefacts.

In 2024, Powlesland featured on an episode of the BBC archaeology programme, Digging for Britain alongside archaeologist Nicky Milner, examining an abandoned Anglo-Saxon settlement from East Heslerton.

== Honours ==
On 1 February 2007, he was elected Fellow of the Society of Antiquaries of London (FSA). In 2009, he was elected an Honorary Member of the Aerial Archaeology Research Group. He was awarded an honorary doctorate by the University of York in 2011 in recognition of his pioneering work in landscape archaeology and computer applications in archaeology.

In 2019, he was awarded the Landscape Archaeology Medal by the British Academy.
