= Berlin-Biesdorf deer antler mask =

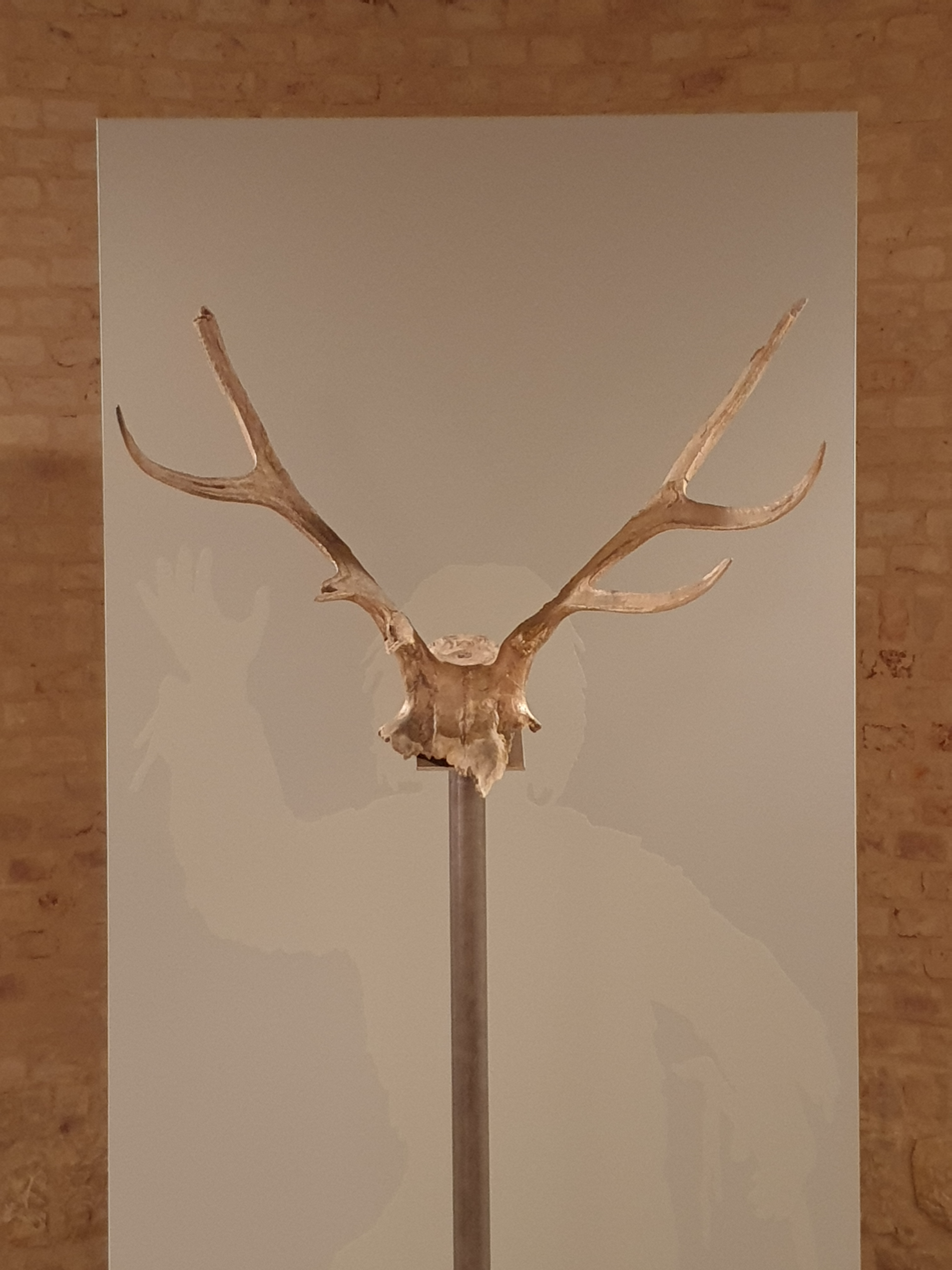
- Berlin-Bliesdorf antler mask in the Neues Museum 2019
- Material: Bone, antler
- Created: c. 8570 BC
- Discovered: Berlin-Biesdorf, Germany

The Berlin-Biesdorf deer antler mask (also known as the Berlin-Biesdorf headdress) is a modified deer skull, probably worn by people as a headdress, found at Berlin-Biesdorf, Germany, and dating to the Mesolithic period.

== Discovery and interpretation ==
It was found in 1953 during construction work on the west bank of the Wuhle. The mask dates the period between 8770 and 8570 BC.

As part of an experimental archaeological project in the museum village of Düppel, a replica of the same material was made with stone tools to investigate the production technique and wearability. By processing the antler poles, which the original also has, the weight was halved and could thus be carried on the head

There are other Mesolithic red deer headdresses, such as at Star Carr and Deer antler masks from Bedburg-Königshoven. The Berlin-Biesdorf mask has morphological similarities to one at Star Carr with the retention of the antlers and the bones of the skull present.

== Public display ==
The object is part of the archaeological collection of the Stadtmuseum Berlin (Inv.Nr. I 82/26). In 2019/2020, the object was part of the special exhibition "Berlin's largest excavation. Biesdorf Research Area" at the Neues Museum, Berlin. It was transferred to the Museum für Vor- und Frühgeschichte and is on permanent display in the Neues Museum since 2020.
