= Star Carr =

Mesolithic archaeological site in North Yorkshire, England

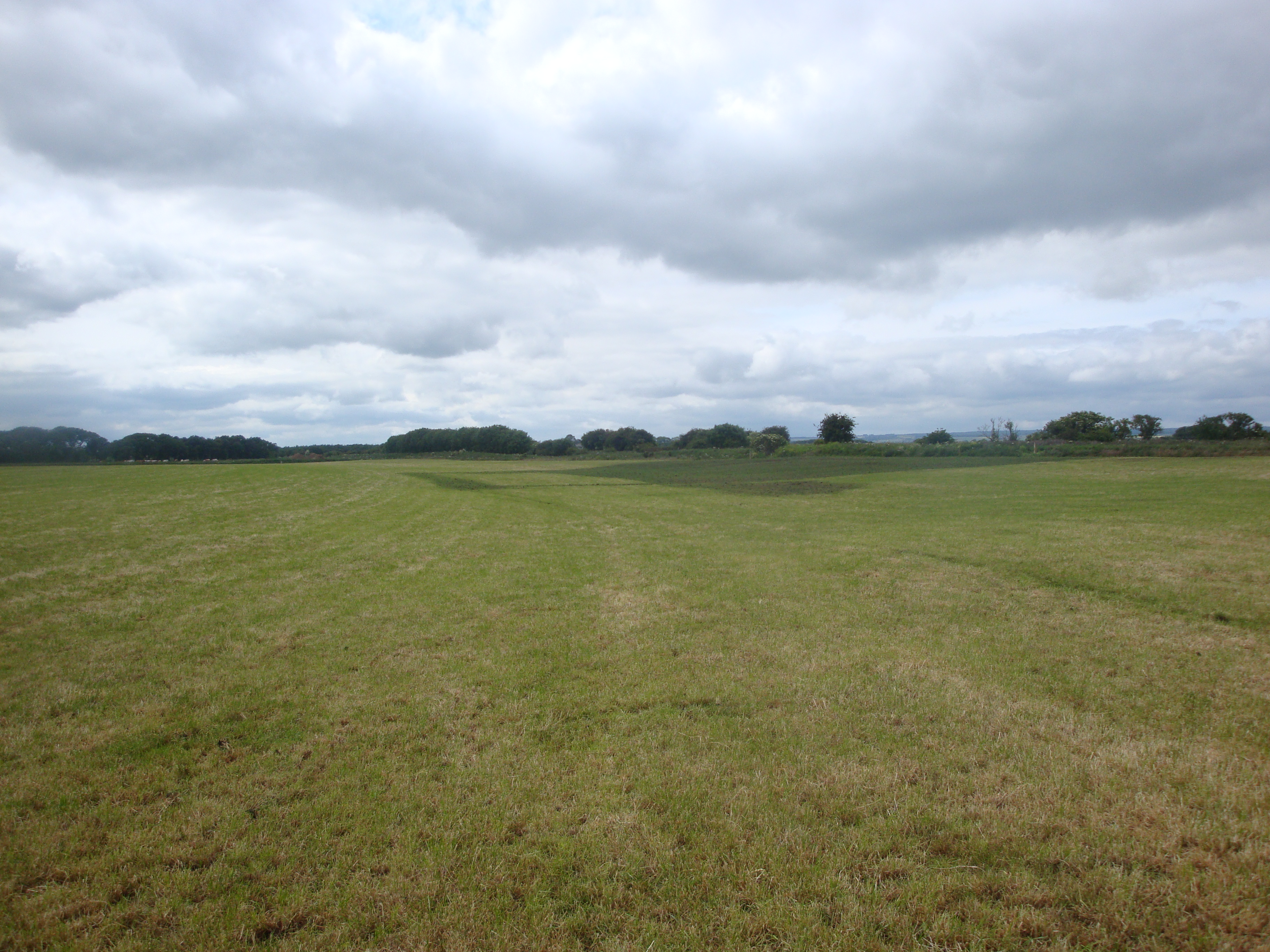
- View of the Star Carr site looking north-west-west

- Location within North Yorkshire
- 54°12′51″N 00°25′24″W
- Type: Settlement
- Periods: Mesolithic
- Location: Scarborough, North Yorkshire, England

History
- Built: c. 9300 BC
- Abandoned: c. 8480 BC

Site notes
- Discovered: 1947 by John Moore

Star Carr is a Mesolithic archaeological site in North Yorkshire, England. It is around five miles (8 km) south of Scarborough. It is generally regarded as the most important and informative Mesolithic site in Great Britain.

The site was occupied during the early Mesolithic archaeological period, which coincided with the preboreal and boreal climatic periods. Though the ice age had ended and temperatures were close to modern averages, sea levels had not yet risen sufficiently to separate Britain from continental Europe. Highlights among the finds include Britain's oldest structure, 21 red deer stag skull-caps that may have been headdresses and nearly 200 projectile, or harpoon, points made of red deer antler. These organic materials were preserved due to having been buried in waterlogged peat. Normally all that remains on Mesolithic sites are stone tools.

Excavation of the site began in 1948, a year after artefacts were first noticed by John Moore, an amateur archaeologist. The site is most famous for some of the extremely rare artefacts discovered during the original excavations but its importance has been reinforced by new understandings of the nature and extent of the Mesolithic archaeology in the area and reinterpretations of the original material.

== Geology ==
Star Carr now lies under farmland at the eastern end of the Vale of Pickering. During the Mesolithic, the site was near the outflow at the western end of a palaeolake, known as Lake Flixton. At the end of the last ice age, a combination of glacial and post-glacial geomorphology caused the area to drain to the west (away from the shortest-distance to the North Sea at Filey). The basin filled by Lake Flixton was probably created by glacial scarring.

The site is preserved due to Lake Flixton having been in-filled with peat during the course of the Mesolithic. Waterlogged peat prevents organic finds from oxidising and has led to some of the best preservation conditions possible (such conditions have preserved the famous bog bodies found in other parts of northern Europe). As a result of such good conditions, archaeologists were able to recover bone, antler and wood in addition to the flints that are normally all that is left on sites from this period.

During the period of Mesolithic occupation, the area surrounding the lake would have been a mixed forest of birch, aspen, and willow. The lake edge and shallows would have been full of reeds, water lilies and other aquatic plants and lake levels would have changed dynamically in response to rainfall or snow-melt.

These and many other plants would have formed the base of a complex food web. The mammals for there is evidence include herbivores such as beavers, red deer, roe deer, elk, aurochs, wild boars and hares, and carnivores such as wolves, lynxes, bears, foxes, pine martens, badgers and hedgehogs.

== Settlement and artefacts ==
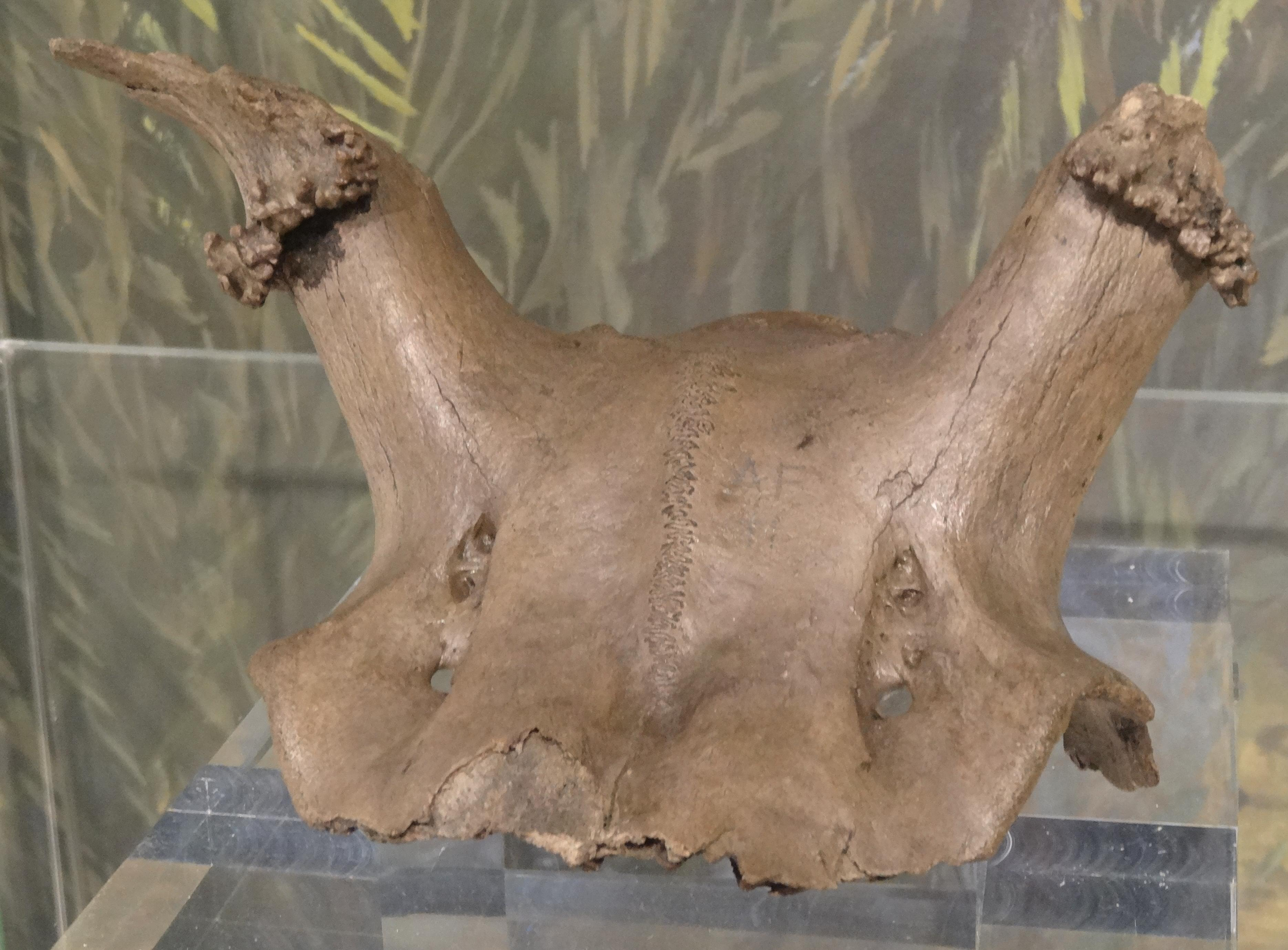
Red Deer Stag skull with holes

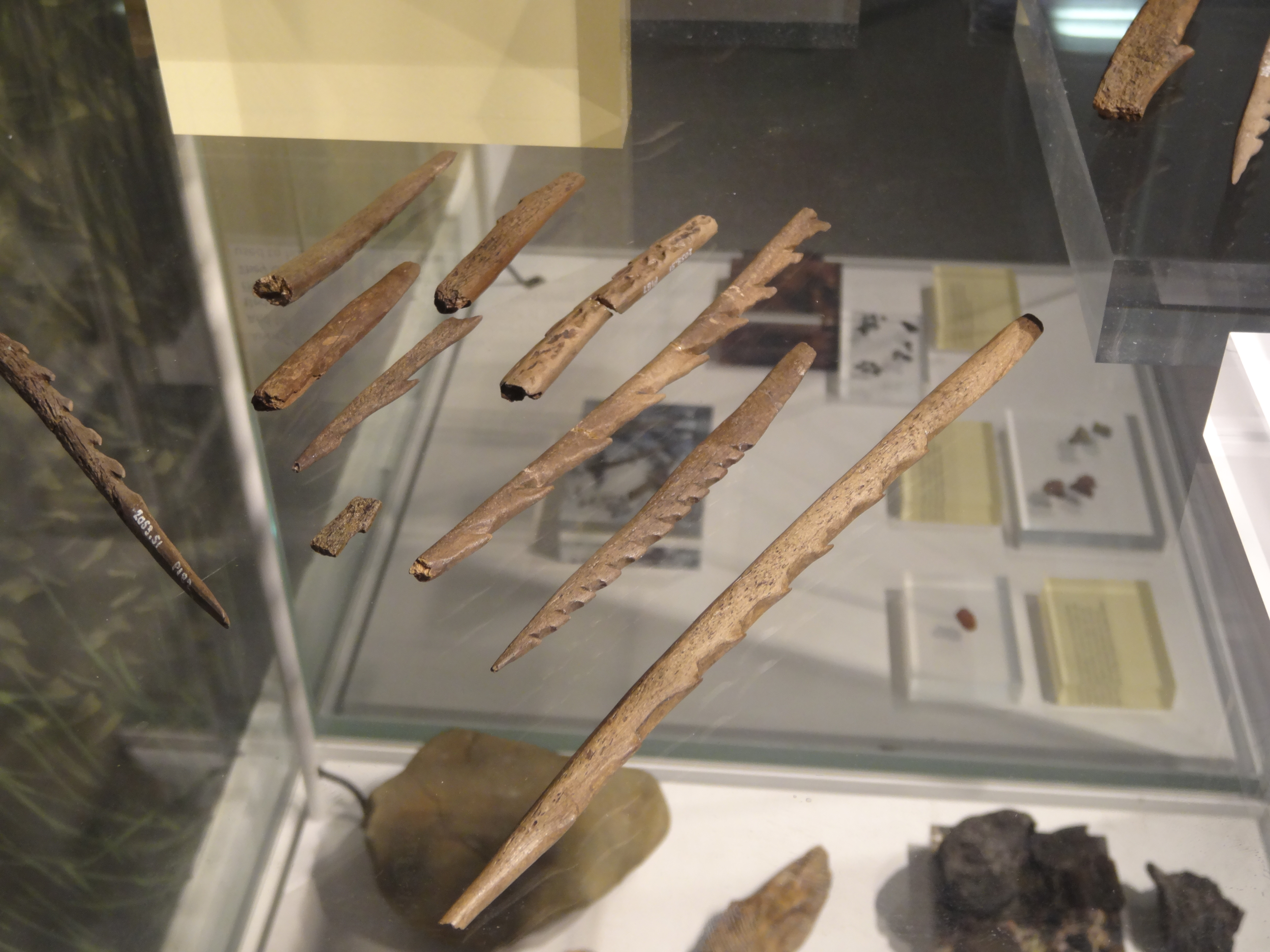
Barbed points

Current radiocarbon dates from the site indicate occupation first commenced between 9335 and 9275 BC, lasting for a period of around 800 years until 8525–8440 BC. However, such occupations may have been episodic in nature, varying in intensity between different periods.

A human-made structure approximately 3.5 metres (11 ft) wide was present: a hut or substantial shelter. This is known from excavated post holes, a sunken area and concentrations of flints, burning and other artefacts. The posts were almost certainly made of wood and roughly 20 cm (8 in) in diameter. There may have been as many as 18 of them and the holes indicated that several may have been replaced over the course of the structure's use. It is impossible to know the form or materials from which the walls and roof would have been made. They may have used hides, thatch, turf or bark on a conical (tepee-like) or rounded (wigwam-like) frame. There is no reason to suppose that the same materials and form would have been used for the structure's entire life-span. There was evidence that the floor was covered with a layer of moss, reeds and other soft plant materials 20–30 cm (8–12 in) deep. Radiocarbon dates indicated a use-life of between 200 and 500 years. The structure has been compared to the Mesolithic structure found at Howick, Northumberland and British Iron Age roundhouses. On its discovery, the structure broke the Howick roundhouse's record as the oldest known house in Britain.

A large wooden platform has been discovered nearby on the shore of the former lake – the earliest known example of carpentry in Europe, though its purpose is as yet unknown. Timbers of Aspen and Willow were split along the grain using wedges (probably made of wood and antler); these were then laid in the boggy areas at the lake shore, presumably to provide firm footing. The extent of the wooden platform is not known but it may be a significantly larger and more complex undertaking than the house-like structure.

Along with the flints that are characteristic of Mesolithic sites, there were a large number of objects made of red deer and elk antler, elk bone, aurochs bone and one piece of bird bone. Rarer objects included worked amber, shale, haematite, iron pyrites, a decorated pendant, thought to be the oldest known Mesolithic art in Britain and tightly rolled pieces of birch-bark and pieces of birch-resin pitch or tar and worked wood. The flint found at Star Carr came from nearby beaches, which at time of occupation would have been about 10 to 20 km (6 to 12 mi) distant, and also from the Yorkshire Wolds immediately to the south of the site.

The two most outstanding categories of finds are the 'barbed points' and 'antler frontlets'. The barbed points are made of the antler of red deer stags. They are between 8 cm (3 in) and 38 cm (15 in) in length and the 195 examples found at Star Carr account for more than 95% of the total number from the British Mesolithic. Many of the barbed points and antler frontlets appear to be deliberately broken. The antler frontlets are made from red deer stag (male) skulls with the antlers still attached. The 21 antler frontlets are sufficiently complete to see how they have been manufactured: two holes were perforated through the skull with a flint tool and the inside of the skull cap was smoothed. The antlers on each frontlet have been carefully trimmed, perhaps to reduce weight. It seems very likely that these modifications are designed to allow the frontlets to be used as headgear. Finds from the site are now divided between five institutions: The British Museum, the Yorkshire Museum in York, the university Museum of Archaeology and Anthropology at Cambridge, the Rotunda Museum in Scarborough and Whitby Museum.

== History of investigations ==
=== Discovery and initial excavations ===
Star Carr was discovered in 1947 when John Moore, an amateur archaeologist, noticed flints in the exposed soil of several recently dredged ditches in the eastern Vale of Pickering. One of these sites, bordering on the New Hertford River was to the south of Star Carr Farm. Moore decided to excavate a small trench at Star Carr in 1948 as part of a series of investigations. On the discovery of intact organic remains, Moore contacted Professor Grahame Clark of the University of Cambridge via Harry Godwin and the curator of the Scarborough Museum, Arthur Clapham.

Clark directed excavations from 1949 to 1951. He began his investigation with the explicit aim of building a more detailed picture of the Mesolithic environment and the ways in which people used it. The organic preservation enabled the recovery of the plant and animal remains necessary for this. Clark's 1954 publication of these excavations is a seminal text in the study of the British Mesolithic and prehistory generally.

Clark believed he had uncovered the entirety of the site and believed Star Carr could be used as a type-site for the British Mesolithic. He drew parallels between the finds at Star Carr and the site of Maglemose in Denmark. It is now recognised that many of Clark's inferences were incorrect but the excavation remains one of the most important in the study of British prehistory ever undertaken.

=== Further investigations: The Lake Flixton Landscape ===
In 1977, archaeologists excavated Iron Age, Bronze Age, and Mesolithic material from Seamer Carr, just to the north of Star Carr. These excavations were conducted in advance of the Seamer Carr landfill site. The discovery of Mesolithic material led to a new series of investigations around Lake Flixton directed by Tim Schadla-Hall (currently University College London). This team returned to Star Carr in 1985 and 1989.

This project investigated the archaeology and ecology of the wider landscape around Lake Flixton and found several more Mesolithic sites but none with as many of the unusual artefacts (such as barbed points and antler frontlets) discovered at Star Carr.

=== Post-2000 investigations ===
Animated image showing the sequence of engravings on a pendant excavated from the Mesolithic archaeological site of Starr Carr in 2015

In the 2000s, new excavations began at Star Carr. This reinvestigation was directed by Nicky Milner (University of York), Chantal Conneller (University of Manchester) and Barry Taylor (University of Chester). This ongoing project has reinvestigated Clark's excavations and also excavated the dry-land, discovering the structure.

Geochemical investigations demonstrated that the preservation conditions have deteriorated. The result of this is that any remaining organic artefacts will be far less informative than those discovered by previous excavation projects. Though the reasons for this remain somewhat unclear, it appears that the acidity of the groundwater has massively increased in the last few years.

A decorated pendant (the Star Carr Pendant), thought to be the oldest known Mesolithic art in Britain, was found at the site in 2015. The 11,000 year old object has been on display at the Yorkshire Museum with other finds from the site since 2016.

== Interpretive debates ==
Clark, the original excavator, believed the Mesolithic people would have lived on a brushwood platform on the edge of the former Lake Flixton. Recent excavations have revealed that people lived on the dry land upslope of the lake and various activities were carried out at the lake edge.

There is much debate about the time of year the site was occupied. Mesolithic people hunted a number of animals including red and roe deer, elk, aurochs and wild boar but there are various seasonal assessments and as the site was occupied over several hundred years it is likely that seasonal practices varied over time.

It has been suggested that the antler frontlets were used as a hunting disguise, or in some form of ritual practice. Recent work suggests that these, along with other objects made from red deer antler, appear to have been respectfully deposited at the lake edge due to the spiritual significance of red deer to the people who occupied the site.

Anthony Legge and Peter Rowley-Conway reexamined the animal bones located at the site. They found strong evidence to suggest that the site was used only in late spring and summer; evidence that the cull of red and roe deer was biased towards three- and one-year-old animals respectively; revision of available meat; reduction in scale of occupation; no bias towards hunting of male red deer, and tentatively suggested that the site was used as a hunting camp.
