= Malin Holst =

German bioarchaeologist

- Born: Hamburg
- Education: Dorset Institute of Higher Education, University of Leicester, University of Sheffield, University of Bradford
- Occupations: bioarchaeologist, lecturer
- Years active: 1987–present

Malin Holst FSA is a German bioarchaeologist, Director of York Ostoearchaeology Ltd. and a lecturer in the Department of Archaeology at the University of York.

== Career ==
Malin Holst started working in archaeology in 1987 at the Raunds Area Project. She studied Practical Archaeology in 1991 at the Dorset Institute of Higher Education. She received a BA degree in 1993 from the University of Leicester and received an MSc degree in 1997 from the Universities of Sheffield and Bradford. She has been working in bioarchaeology since 1996.

She is the Director of York Ostoearchaeology Ltd. and is a lecturer in Archaeology in the Department of Archaeology, University of York since 2003.

Malin was elected as a Fellow of the Society of Antiquaries of London in October 2016.

== Filmography ==
She has appeared as herself in television documentaries, including:

- Secrets: The Headless Gladiators of York (2017) Self - Osteoarchaeologist
- Forgotten Warrior (2015) Self - Director, York Osteoarchaeology
- Medieval Dead: Last Stand at Visby (2013) Self - Osteoarchaeologist, University of York
- Medieval Dead: Richard III's Lost Chapel (2013) Self - Osteoarchaeologist, University of York
- Medieval Dead: Pestilence and Disease (2013) Self - Osteoarchaeologist, University of York
- Medieval Dead: The Mysterious Woman of Tadcaster (2013) Self - Osteoarchaeologist, University of York
- Secrets of the Dead: Murder at Stonehenge (2001) Self - Osteoarchaeologist
- Secrets of the Dead: Blood Red Roses (2000) Self - Osteoarchaeologist - University of Bradford

== Publications ==
- Caffell, A., Ponce, P. and Holst, M. 2022. ‘Osteological analysis, Burnby Lane and The Mile’, in M. Stephens, Chariots, Swords and Spears, Iron Age Burials at the Foot of the East Yorkshire Wolds (Oxford): 168–191
- Keefe, K., Petersone-Gordina, E. and Holst, M. 2022. ‘Chapter 6. Human Bone’, in A Richmond, K. Francis and G Coates, Waterlands: Prehistoric Life at Bar Pasture, Pode Hole Quarry, Peterborough (Oxford): 237–248
- Chidimuro, B., Mundorff, A., Speller, C., Radini, A., Boudreault, N., Lucas, M., Holst, M., Lamb, A., Collins, M. and Alexander, M. 2022. ‘Isotope analysis of human dental calculus δ13CO32: investigating a potential new proxy for sugar consumption’, Rapid Communications in Mass Spectrometry, e9286
- MacKenzie, L., Speller, C.F., Holst, M., Keefe, K. and Radini, A. 2021. ‘Dental calculus in the industrial age: Human dental calculus in the Post-Medieval period, a case study from industrial Manchester’, Quaternary International https://doi.org/10.1016/j.quaint.2021.09.020
- Caffell, A. and Holst, M. 2021.‘Human Remains’, in W. A. Boismier, E. Taylor, and Y. Wolframm-Murray (eds) Excavations at Stanground South, Peterborough: Prehistoric, Roman and Post-Medieval Settlement Along the Margins of the Fens (Oxford): 165–216
- Daniel, P., with contributions by Andrews, P., Caffell, A. Challinor, D., Dunne, J., Evershed, R.P., Gillard, T., Holst, M., Keefe, K., Leivers, M., López-Dóriga, I., Mepham, L., Petersone-Gordina, E. and Quinn, P.S. 2021. ‘“What are the dead for?” Bronze Age burials in a multi-period landscape at Bucklow Hill, Cheshire, Archaeological Journal, https://doi.org/10.1080/00665983.2021.1921413
- Keefe, K. and Holst, M. 2021. ‘Chapter 13, Human Bone’, in J. Philips and P. Wilson, Life, Death and Rubbish Disposal in Roman Norton, Norton Yorkshire: Excavations at Brooklyn House 2015-2016 (Oxford): 237–247
- Dodd, L., Ball, M., Ní Challanáin, M., Holst, M., Huckerby, E., Ingrem, C., Mason, D., Robinson, D. and Shotter, D. 2020. Excavations at Chester. The Northern and Eastern Roman Extramural Settlements: Excavations 1990-2019 and Other Investigations (Summertown)
- Siozos, P., Hausmann, N., Holst, M. and Anglos, D. 2020. ‘Application of Laser-Induced Breakdown Spectroscopy and Neural Networks on Archaeological Human Bones for the Discrimination of Distinct Individuals’, arXiv preprint arXiv:2012.14470, https://doi.org/10.1016/j.jasrep.2020.102769
- Mace, T., with contributions by Vyner, B., Keefe, K., Holst, M., Walker, A., Elsworth, D.W. and Fitzpatrick, A. 2019. ‘A Bronze Age cremation cemetery at Jack Hill, Allithwaite’, Transactions of the Cumberland and Westmorland Antiquarian and Archaeological Society 19: 1-22 doi:10.5284/1084902
- Hendy, J., Warinner, C., Bouwman, A., Collins, M. J., Fiddyment, S., Fischer, R., Hagan, R., Hofman, C. A., Holst, M., Chaves, E., Klaus, L., Larson, G., Mackie, M., McGrath, K., Mundorff, A. Z., Radini, A., Rao, H., Trachsel, C., Velsko, I. M. and Speller, C. F. 2018. ‘Proteomic evidence of dietary sources in ancient dental calculus‘, Proceedings of the Royal Society B: Biological Sciences, 285, 1883
- Speed, G. and Holst, M. (eds). 2018. A1 Leeming to Barton. Death, Burial and Identity, 300 Years of Death in the Vale of Mowbray, NAA Monograph Volume 4 (Barnard Castle)
- Speed, G., Holst, M., Keefe, K. and Newman, S. 2018.‘Death, burial, identity and beyond’, in G. Speed and M. Holst, A1 Leeming to Barton. Death, Burial and Identity, 300 Years of Death in the Vale of Mowbray, NAA Monograph Volume 4 (Barnard Castle): 600–656
- Holst, M., Keefe, K. and Newman, S. 2018.‘Human remains’, in G. Speed and M. Holst, A1 Leeming to Barton. Death, Burial and Identity, 300 Years of Death in the Vale of Mowbray, NAA Monograph Volume 4 (Barnard Castle): 372–466
- Speed, G., Fell, D., Holst, M., Keefe, K. and Newman, S. 2018.‘The prehistoric burials, in G. Speed and M. Holst, A1 Leeming to Barton. Death, Burial and Identity, 300 Years of Death in the Vale of Mowbray, NAA Monograph Volume 4 (Barnard Castle): 22-40
- Gowland, R.L., Caffell, A., Newman, S., Levene, A. & Holst, M. 2018.‘Broken childhoods: rural and urban non-adult health during the Industrial Revolution in Northern England (eighteenth – nineteenth centuries), Bioarchaeology International 2(1): 44-62
- Holst, M. & Alexander, M. (eds). 2018. Trends in Biological Anthropology, Volume 2 (Oxford)
- Holst, Malin (20 October 2017). "Response to the paper by Redfern and Clegg by Malin Holst". World Archaeology. 49 (5): 588–593. doi:10.1080/00438243.2017.1411825. ISSN 0043-8243.
- Keefe, K. and Holst, M. 2018. ‘Human remains’, in C. Ambrey, D. Fell, R. Fraser, S. Ross, G. Speed, and P. N. Wood, A Roman Roadside Settlement at Healam Bridge: The Iron Age to Early Medieval Evidence, Volume 1, Archaeological Narrative, Environmental Evidence, and Human Remains (Barnard Castle): 157–200
- Mackie, M., Hendy, J. R., Lowe, A. D., Sperduti, A., Holst, M., Collins, M. J. & Speller, C. F.2017. ‘Preservation of the metaproteome: Variability of protein preservation in ancient dental calculus, STAR: Science Technology of Archaeological Research
- Alexander, M., Austick, J., Buglass, J., Caffell, A., Fackrell, M., Fackrell, K., French, M., Goodall, C., Gowland, R., Hart, M., Holst, M., Heyworth, B., Lister, A., Lister, M., Monaghan, C., Monaghan, M., Neal, S., Power, D., Robinson, C., Robinson, S., Speller, C., Waters, G. 2017. The Fewston Assemblage: Churchyard Secrets Revealed. Washburn Heritage Centre
- Jones, A.M., Brunning, R., Keefe, K. and Holst, M. 2017. ‘Recent radiocarbon dating and skeletal analysis of two log coffin burials from Yorkshire: Willie Howe and Towthorpe 139’, Yorkshire Archaeological Journal 89 (1): 61–74
- Fotaki, A. and Holst, M. 2017. 'Human Remains', in Burn, Z., Stephens, M. and Ware P., A Roman Military Camp at Jack Berry House, Injured Jockey Rehabilitation Centre, Old Malton Road, Malton, North Yorkshire, MAP Archaeological Practice Publications
- Thomas, J., with contributions by Addison, H., Beamish, M., Browning, J., Buckley, R., Cooper, L., Cooper, N.J., Holst, M., Johnson, E., Keefe, K., Monckton, A., Morgan, G., Radini, A., Sawday, D. and Small, R. 2017.‘New light on Leicester’s Roman southern cemetery: Recent excavations at the junction of Oxford Street and Newarke Street, Transactions of the Leicestershire Archaeological and Historical Society 91: 45-96
- Fotakis, A. & Holst, M. 2016.‘Human bone’, in D. Williams, Excavations of the Onshore Cable Route for Westernmost Rough Offshore Windfarm East Riding Archaeologist 16: 91–94
- Keefe, K. & Holst, M. 2016.‘Human remains’, in G. Glover, P. Flintoft, and R. Moore, A Mersshy Contree Called Holdernesse’: Excavations on the Route of a National Grid Pipeline in Holderness, East Yorkshire, Archaeopress (Oxford): 224–229
- Martiniano, R., Caffell, A., Holst, M., Hunter-Mann, K., Montgomery, J., Müldner, G., McLaughlin, R.L., Teasdale, M.D., van Rheenen, W., Veldink, J.H., van den Berg, L.H., Hardiman, O., Carroll, M., Roskams, S., Oxley, J., Morgan, C., Thomas, M.G., Barnes, I., McDonnell, C., Collins, M.J. & Bradley, D.G. 2016. ‘Genomic signals of migration and continuity in Britain before the Anglo-Saxons’, Nature Communications
- Holst, M. & Sutherland, T. 2014.‘Towton Revisited – Analysis of the Human Remains from the Battle of Towton 1461’, Schlachtfeld und Massengrab: Spektren Interdisziplinärer Auswertung von Orten der Gewalt: 97–129
- Sutherland, T. & Holst, M. 2014.‘Demonstrating the value of battlefield archaeology - war graves on ‘Towton field’: their location and excavation’, Schlachtfeld und Massengrab: Spektren Interdisziplinärer Auswertung von Orten der Gewalt: 87–95
- Buckberry, J., Montgomery, J., Towers, J., Müldner, G., Holst, M., Evans, J., Gledhill, A., Neale, N. & Lee-Thorp, J. 2014.‘Finding Vikings in the Danelaw’, Oxford Journal of Archaeology 33(4): 413–434
- Richardson, J. & Weston, P., with contributions by Alldritt, D., Carrott, J., Disbury, P., Foster, A., Holst, M., Makey, P., Manby, T. & Walker, A. 2014.‘Earlier Prehistoric Activity and a later Iron Age and Roman Field System at Beacons Lagoons, Kilnsea, East Riding of Yorkshire’, Yorkshire Archaeological Journal 86: 3-32
- Martiniano, R., Holst, M., McDonnell, C., Hunter-Mann, K., Collins, M. & Bradley, D. 2014.‘Genetic Snapshot of Roman Britain Supports Diverse Ancestral Origins’, Poster Presentation for Biological Sequence Analysis, Oxford, July 2014
- Murphy, K. & Murphy, F. with contributions from Gibson, A., Davis, M., Keefe, K., Holst, M., Caseldine, A.E. & Griffiths, C.J. 2013. ‘The excavation of two Bronze Age round barrows at Pant y Butler, Llangoedmor, Ceredigion, 2009–10’, Archaeologia Cambrensis 162: 33–66
- Schlee, D, with contributions by Austin, L., Caseldine, A.E., Gibson, A., Holst, M., Parkes, P., Foster, A., Foster, L., Walker, A. & Carrott, J. 2013. ‘The excavation of Fan round barrow, near Talsarn, Ceredigion, 2010–11’, Archaeologia Cambrensis 162: 67–104
- Caffell, A. & Holst, M. 2013. ‘Human remains’, in L. Martin, J. Richardson & I. Roberts (eds), Iron Age and Roman Settlements at Wattle Syke (Leeds): 201–227
- Bouwman, A.S., Kennedy, S.L., Müller, R., Stephens, R.H., Holst, M., Caffell, A.C., Roberts, C.A. & Brown, T.A. 2012, ‘The genotype of a historic strain of Mycobacterium tuberculosis’, Proceedings of the National Academy of Sciences of the United States of America 109: 18511–18516
- Keefe, K. and Holst, M. 2012. ‘Human bone’, in J. Richardson, Iron Age and Roman Settlement Activity at Newbridge Quarry, Pickering, North Yorkshire, Archaeological Services WYAS Publication 12: 59–62
- Caffell, A. & Holst, M. 2011.‘Osteological analysis’, in Fenton-Thomas, C., Where Sky and Yorkshire and Water Meet, On-Site Archaeology Monograph 2 (York): 323–332
- Richardson, J. with contributions by Alldritt, D., Barclay, C., Brooks, I., Carrott, I., Chernery, C., Cool, H., Cowgill, J., Didsbury, P., Evans, J., Fern, C., Gaunt, G., Hartley, K. Heslop, D., Holst, M. Manby, T., Morris, E., Wild, F. & Williams, D. 2011. ‘Bronze Age Cremations, Iron Age and Roman Settlement and Early Medieval Inhumations at the Langeled Receiving Facilities, Easington, East Riding of Yorkshire’, The Yorkshire Archaeological Journal 83 (1): 59–100
- Holst, M. 2011. ‘A comparative study of ‘continuity’ cemeteries in Yorkshire’, CBA Yorkshire Forum: 15–16
- Holst, M. 2009. ‘The human remains’ in Ian Roberts, ‘A late Iron Age and Romano-British Settlement at High Wold, Bempton Lane, Bridlington, East Yorkshire’, The Yorkshire Archaeological Journal 81:47-137
- Holst, M. 2009. ‘The human remains’, in J. Hart & E.R. McSloy, ‘Prehistoric and early historic activity, settlement and burial at Walton Cardiff, near Tewkesbury: Excavations at Ridgeway Lane in 2004-2005, in N. Holbrook (eds), Iron Age and Romano-British Agriculture in North Gloucestershire Severn Vale, Bristol and Gloucestershire Archaeological Report 6: 48-54
- Roberts, C., Betsinger, T., RH Steckel, C.S. Larsen, P.L. Walker, J. Blondiaux, G. Grupe, G. Maat, G. McGlynn, A. Papathanasiou, M. Teschier-Nicola, U. Wittwer-Backofen, A. Agnew, S. Assis, Z. Bereczki, B. Bertrand, TK.. Betsinger, M. Binder, S. Boulter, C. Bourbou, A. Boylston, M. Brickley, L. Buerli, C. Cooper, A. Coppa, J. Coughlan, A. Drozd, E. During, C. Eliopoulos, J. Eng, F. Engel, S. Fox, M. Furtado, G. Gerhards, S. Groves, K. Harkins, P. Holck, M. Holst, G. Hotz, R. Ives, T. Jakob, R. Jankauskas, J. Jennings, H. Justus, K. Kaminska, A. Kjellstrom, C.J. Knüsel, T. Kozlowski, A. Lagia, C. Lopes, S. Manolis, A. Marcsik, C. Marques, C. Moenke, C. Niel, S.A. Novak, F. Novotny, J. Peck, I. Potiekhina, B. Rega, R. Richman, F. Rijpma, J. Rose, J. Ruiz, P. Sannen, P. Sciulli, M. Smith, A. Soficaru, M. Spannagl, R. Storm, G. Stroud, E. Subira, D. Swales, V. Tristaroli, E. Tyler, S. Ulrich-Bochsler, S Vatteoni, V Villar, R. Wiggins, L.L. Williams, 2009. ‘The history of European infectious diseases: skeletal evidence of tuberculosis, leprosy, and treponematosis’, in American Journal of Physical Anthropology: 222–223
- Holst, M. 2008. ‘Human bone: osteological assessment’ in M. Carver (ed) Wasperton Anglo-Saxon Cemetery, http://ads.ahds.ac.uk/catalogue/archive/wasperton_eh_2008/overview.cfm?CFID=573996andCFTOKEN=39545028
- Luke, M. with major contributions by Allen, C., Bates, S., Duncan, H., Holst, M., Macphail, R., Maltby, M., Pelling, R., Robinson, M., Slowikowski, A. & Wells, J. 2008. Life in the Loop: Investigation of a Prehistoric and Romano-British Landscape at Biddenham Loop, Bedfordshire, East Anglian Archaeology 125
- Cullen, K., Holbrook, N., Watts, M., Caffell, A. & Holst, M. 2007. ‘A Post-Roman cemetery at Hewlett Packard, Filton, South Gloucestershire: Excavations in 2005’ in M. Watts (ed) Two Cemeteries from Bristol's Northern Suburbs. Bristol and Gloucestershire Archaeological Report 4: 51–96
- Mays, S. & Holst, M. 2006. ‘Palaeo-otology of cholesteatoma’, International Journal of Osteoarchaeology 16: 1–15
- Sutherland, T.L. & Holst, M. 2005. Battlefield Archaeology – Guide to the Archaeology of Conflict, http://www.bajr.org/DocumentsBAJRBattleGuide.pdf
- Holst, M. 2005. ‘Human Remains’, in I. Roberts (eds) Ferrybridge Henge. The Ritual Landscape, Archaeological Services WYAS, Yorkshire Archaeology 10 (Leeds): 167–175
- Boylston, A., Novak, S., Sutherland, T., Holst, M., Coughlan, J. & Knüsel, C. 2004. ‘Archaeology and anthropology of medieval warfare: an investigation of burials from the Battle of Towton AD 1461’, Medieval History 10: 50–57
- Dickinson, T. 2004. ‘An early Anglo-Saxon cemetery at Quarrington, near Sleaford, Lincolnshire: Report on excavations, 2000-2001’, Lincolnshire History and Archaeology 39: 24–45, with contributions by M. Holst
- Holst, M. 2003. Health in Medieval York: New Perspectives into Medieval Health through the Analysis of further Cemetery Populations, Poster Presentation at the Fifth Annual Conference of the British Association of Biological Anthropology and Osteoarchaeology
- Holst, M. & Coughlan, J., 2000.‘Dental Health and Disease’, in V. Fiorato, A Boylston & C. Knüsel (eds), Blood Red Roses: The Archaeology of a Medieval Mass Grave from the Battle of Towton 1461, Oxbow Books, Oxford, 77–89
- Coughlan, J. & Holst, M. 2000. ‘Health Status’, in V. Fiorato, A Boylston & C. Knüsel (eds), Blood Red Roses: The Archaeology of a Medieval Mass Grave from the Battle of Towton 1461, Oxbow Books, Oxford, 60–76
- Boylston, A., Holst, M. & Coughlan, J.2000. ‘Physical Anthropology’, in V. Fiorato, A Boylston & C. Knüsel (eds), Blood Red Roses: The Archaeology of a Medieval Mass Grave from the Battle of Towton 1461, Oxbow Books, Oxford, 45–59
- Holst, M. 1999.‘Schlacht um Englands Thron’, in Archäologie in Deutschland, 1/99, 58
- Boylston, A., Holst, M., Coughlan, J., Novak, S., Sutherland, T. & Knüsel, C.1997. ‘Recent Excavations of a Mass Grave from Towton’, in Yorkshire Medicine, 9 (3), 25–6
- Boylston, A., Novak, S., Sutherland, T., Holst, M. & Coughlan, J. 1997.‘Burials from the Battle of Towton’, Royal Armouries Yearbook 2: 26-36
