= Secrets from the Sky =

- Genre: Documentary
- Country of origin: United Kingdom
- Original language: English
- No. of series: 1
- No. of episodes: 6

Production
- Running time: 30 minutes

Original release
- Network: ITV
- Release: 17 October – 21 November 2014

Secrets from the Sky is a six-part British documentary television series that aired on ITV from 17 October to 21 November 2014, presented by historian Bettany Hughes and archaeologist Ben Robinson.

The series explores the history and archaeology of British landmarks using aerial footage captured by an octocopter drone, revealing traces of past human activity in the landscape.

== List of episodes ==
Episode number	Episode name	Original date aired	Episode information
1	Tintagel Castle	17 October 2014	Hughes and Robinson examine the remains of an early medieval settlement at Tintagel in Cornwall, its trading links with the Mediterranean and its possible connection to the legend of King Arthur.
2	Old Sarum	24 October 2014	The presenters investigate the history of the former fortified settlement at Old Sarum in Wiltshire, including its decline and the development of nearby Salisbury.
3	Stonehenge	31 October 2014	Aerial views of Stonehenge and its surroundings provide a perspective on the history of the prehistoric monument and its archaeological landscape.
4	Maiden Castle	7 November 2014	Hughes and Robinson examine the construction and development of Maiden Castle, an Iron Age hillfort in Dorset.
5	Sutton Hoo	14 November 2014	The presenters explore the Anglo-Saxon royal burial ground at Sutton Hoo in Suffolk and investigate its archaeological significance.
6	Antonine Wall	21 November 2014	The final episode examines the construction of the Antonine Wall in Scotland and the reasons for the abandonment of this Roman frontier.
