= Stephen Church =

Stephen Church is a writer and professor of medieval history at the University of Lincoln and is an expert on King John. In 2015 his book King John: England, Magna Carta, and the Making of a Tyrant was one of the Financial Times best books of the year.

== Career ==
Church is an expert in Medieval History, specifically the 12th Century and works at the University of Lincoln which he joined in 2023 after working for twenty-eight years at the University of East Anglia. He completed his postgraduate work in London. He is also a trustee of the Allen Brown Memorial Trust, where he organised the conference and edited the proceedings of Anglo-Norman Studies between 2020 and 2024. The Trust also gives conference bursaries for postgraduate students and sponsors sessions at other conferences and a postgraduate reading group.

He has written more than thirty articles edited seven collections of essays, two medieval documents, and written three monographs on a variety of topics to do with the period 1000 to 1300 His most substantial works have been on the subject of King John and Magna Carta. Church has been regularly acknowledged as strong supporter of fellow Historians in their writing and has lectured in Europe on the subject of the Plantagenet Empire. In 2010 he co-led with Professor Elisabeth Tyler (University of York) two reading groups which aimed to read Orderic Vitalis's Historica ecclesiastica from start to finish and reflect on its content. In 2015 he appeared on Saturday Extra on Australian station ABC Radio with Nicholas Cowdery to discuss why does Magna Carta still matter, and co-presented the BBC programme The Last Journey of the Magna Carta King, part of the BBC Taking Liberties season, with archaeologist Dr Ben Robinson.

== Publications ==
=== Books ===
- 2026 - The Angevin World, 1154-1204: New Interpretations (with Laura Cleaver and Matthew Strickland) ISBN 9781837654406.
- 2020, 2021, 2022, 2023, 2024 - Anglo-Norman Studies, 42, 43, 44, 45, 46 ISSN 0954-9927
- 2017 – Henry III: A Simple and God-Fearing King ISBN 9780141977997
- 2015 – King John: England, Magna Carta, and the Making of a Tyrant ISBN 9780230772458
- 2015 – King John and the Road to Magna Carta ISBN 9780465092994
- 2007 – King John: New Interpretations ISBN 9780851159478
- 2007 – Dialogus de Scaccario, and Constitutio Domus Regis The Dialogue of the Exchequer, and The Disposition of the Royal Household (Oxford Medieval Texts) ISBN 9780199258611
- 2001 – The Pakenham Cartulary for the Manor of Ixworth Thorpe, Suffolk, c.1250-c.1320 (17) (Suffolk Charters) ISBN 9780851158358
- 1999 – The Household Knights of King John ISBN 9780521553193
- 1994 – Medieval Knighthood V (with Ruth Harvey) ISBN 9780851156286

=== Selected published articles ===
- 2025 - 'Keeping up appearances: penance and peace-making in the Plantagenet family at the end of the "war without love", 1174-5', Studies in Renaissance and Medieval Sources, 4th series, 1 (2025), 99-137. (This is an open access article made available under a CC BY-NC 4.0 International Licence.)
- 2022 - 'The "Angevin Empire" (1150-1204): A twelfth-century union', Unions and Divisions: New Forms of Rule in Medieval and Renaissance Europe, ed. Paul Srodecki, Norbert Kersken, and Rimvydas Petrauskas (Abingdon: Routledge, 2022), pp. 68–82.
- 2022 - 'Nobility and aristocracy' (with Daniel Booker) The Cambridge Companion to the Age of William the Conqueror, ed. Benjamin Pohl (Cambridge: Cambridge University Press, 2022), pp. 163–84.
- 2022 - 'Henri III et Le Maine' in Les Plantagenêts et Le Maine, ed. Martin Aurell, Ghislain Baury, Vincent Carriol, and Laurent Maillet (Rennes, France: University of Rennes Press, 2022), pp. 84–91
- 2021 - 'Jean sans Terre et le gouvernement par un étranger: l’exemple du Poitou', Gouverner l’empire Plantagenêt (1152-1224) Autorité, symboles, idéologie Collection Colloques Patrimoines en région, ed. Martin Aurell (Nantes, France: University of Nantes Press, 2021), pp. 312–25.
- 2020 - ‘The date and place of King John’s birth together with a codicil on his name', Notes & Queries, 67.3 (2020), 1-8.
- 2019 - 'When does advice become Criticism? Criticising John Lackland before Magna Carta', in Kritik am Herrscher, ed. Karina Kellerman and Alheydis Plassmann (Bonn: Bonn University Press, 2019), pp. 377-92.
- 2018 - ‘The dating and making of Magna Carta and the peace of June 1215’, in Staufen and Plantagenets: Two Empires in Comparison, ed. Alheydis Plassmann and Dominik Büschken (Bonn, Germany: Bonn University Press, 2018), pp. 53–69.
- 2018 - 'King John’s books, Richard Marsh, and the interdict proclaimed in 1208 on England and Wales’, in Writing History in the Anglo-Norman World: Manuscripts, Makers and Readers, c.1066-c.1250, ed. Laura Cleaver and Andrea Worm (Woodbridge: Boydell and Brewer, 2018), pp. 149–65.
- 2017 – Political Discourse at the Court of Henry II and the Making of the New Kingdom of Ireland: The Evidence of John’s Title dominus Hibernie – History pg.808–823 ISSN 0018-2648
- 2010 – King John’s Testament and the Last Days of his Reign – English Historical Review pg.505–528 ISSN 1477-4534
- 2009 – The care of the royal tombs in English cathedrals in the nineteenth and twentieth centuries: the case of the effigy of King John at Worcester – The Antiquaries Journal ISSN 1758-5309
- 2008 – Paganism in conversion age Anglo Saxon England: the evidence of Bede's Ecclesiastical History reconsidered – History pg.162–180 ISSN 1468-229X
- 2007 – Aspects of the royal itinerary in twelfth-century England – Thirteenth Century England pg.31–45 ISSN 0269-6967
- 1995 – The rewards of royal service in the household of King John: a dissenting opinion – English Historical Review pg.277–302 ISSN 1477-4534
- 1994 – The earliest English muster roll, 18/19 December 1215 – Historical Research pg.1–17 ISSN 1468-2281
