= Lake Flixton =

Prehistoric lake in North Yorkshire

Coordinates: 54.21°N 0.40°W

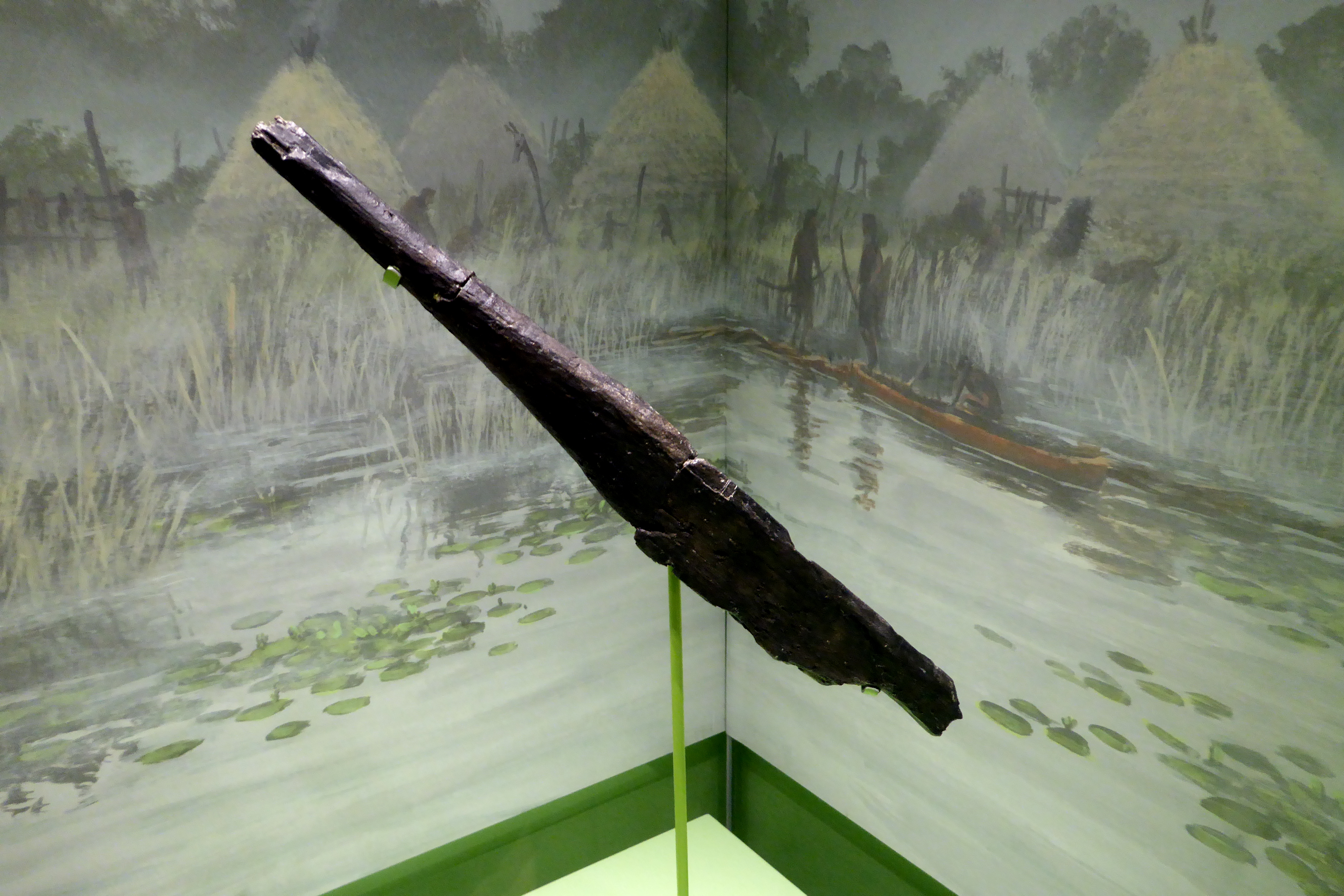
Museum display of a wooden paddle found at Star Carr, with an artist's impression of the lakeshore in the background.

Lake Flixton, or Palaeolake Flixton, was a small prehistoric lake in the Vale of Pickering, North Yorkshire, England, near the modern village of Flixton. The Mesolithic settlement of Star Carr was on the lakeshore at its western end. The lake gradually filled in and the last of its open water disappeared around 7000 years ago.

== Characteristics ==
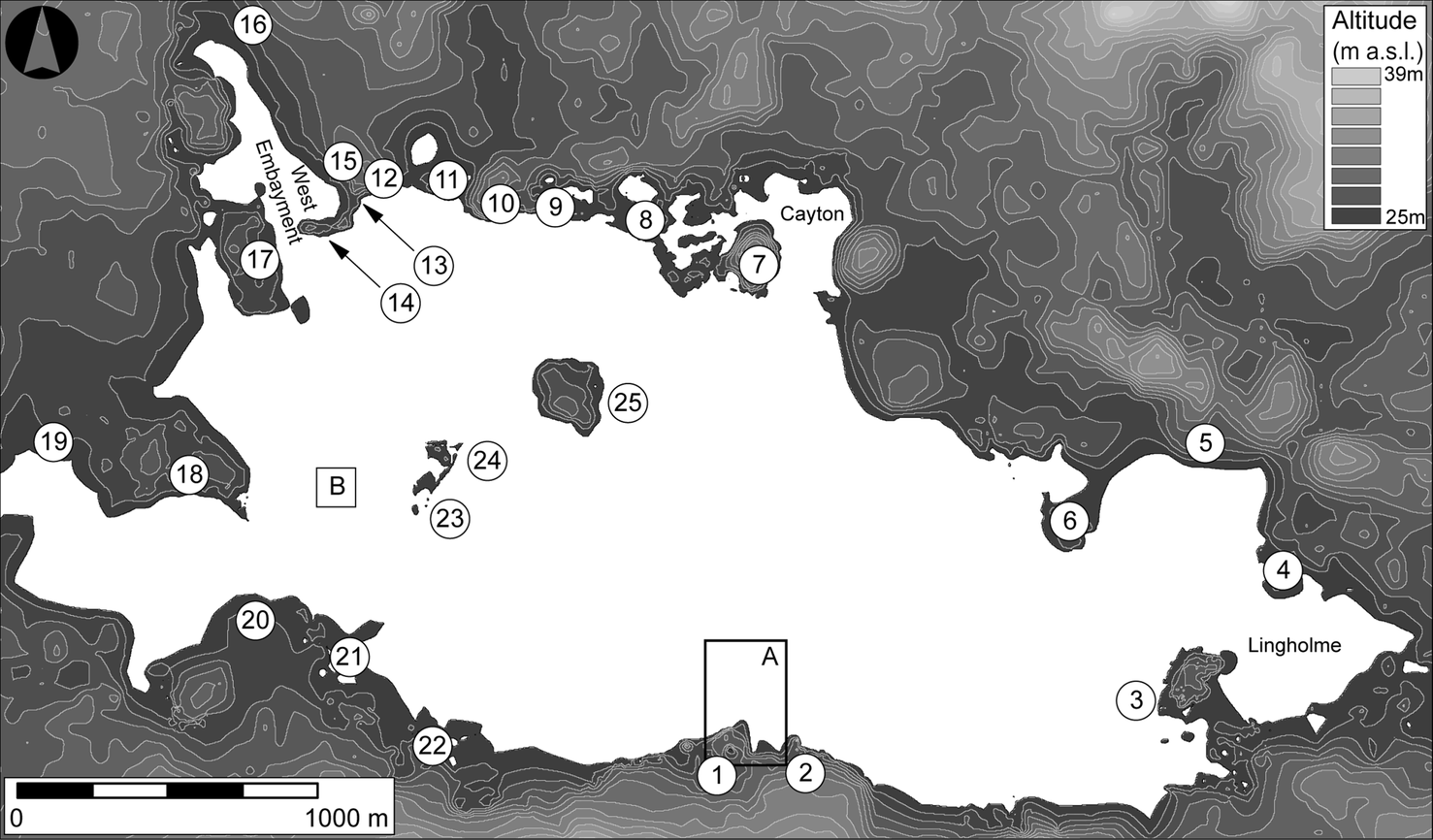
25 archaeological sites are known around Lake Flixton. 1: Flixton School House Farm. 2: Flixton School Field. 3: Barry’s Island. 4: Lingholme Farm Site A. 5: Killerby Carr. 6: Lingholme Farm Site C. 7–9: Cayton Carr. 10: Manham Hill. 11: Seamer C. 12: Seamer B and Rabbit Hill. 13: Seamer Carr K. 14: Seamer D. 15: Seamer Carr L and N. 16: Seamer Carr F. 17: Ling Lane. 18: Star Carr. 19: Flixton 9. 20: VP site D. 21: VP site E. 22: Woodhouse Farm. 23: Flixton Island site (1) 24: Flixton Island site (2) 25: No Name Hill.

=== Formation ===
Lake Flixton formed around fourteen and a half thousand years ago, around the start of the Late Glacial Interstadial period. Before this, the Vale of Pickering had been bracketed by part of the British-Irish Ice Sheet to the west, and a glacier to the east, creating Lake Pickering between them. When the glacier to the east began to retreat, it left behind an uneven landscape of hollows and ridges. Much of Lake Pickering drained away to the southwest, but water trapped in a group of these hollows formed Lake Flixton, with some of the ridges becoming islands within it. The location of the islands still map to small rises in the landscape: archaeologists have dubbed the two most-studied ones Flixton Island and No Name Hill.

=== Infill ===
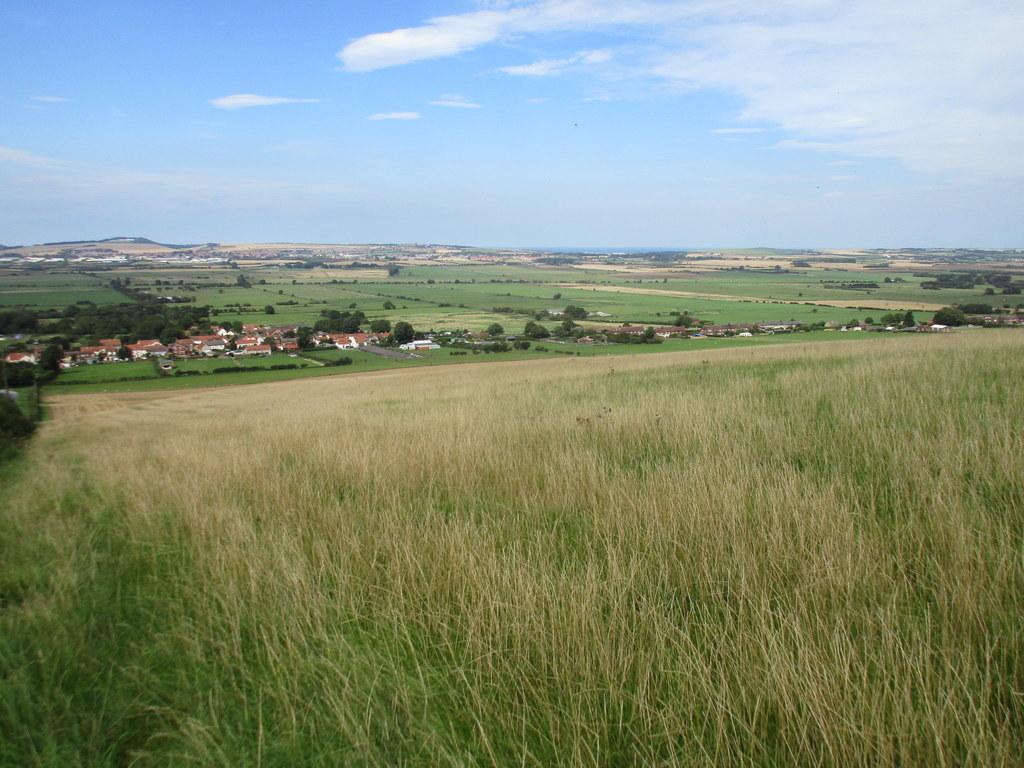
Modern landscape of the area, viewed from a hill

Water plants began to grow in the lake not long after it formed, leading to the deposit of sediment. After some time, peat began to form in the edges of the lake. Though the visible water level would not have dropped, both of these processes made the lake shallower as it filled up from underneath; in turn, this allowed plants to spread into areas previously too deep for them, bringing more sediment and more peat. By the end of the Mesolithic period, about 5300 BCE, the lake had become a wetland, with only small pools of open water left. Today the area is farmland, although the water table is still notably high.

=== Flora and fauna ===
Fossilised pollen and plant material show that the plants growing in and around the lake included water milfoil, bogbean, sedge, bulrush, bur-reed, an unidentified species of Filipendula, juniper, water horehound, waterlilies, nettles, and willow, birch and aspen trees.

Evidence has been found for water-birds including the red-throated loon, two species of grebe, geese, mergansers, scoter ducks and cranes.

Excavations at Star Carr from 1949 onward found no trace of fish, despite it being clear early on that the settlement must have stood on a lake. This was variously suggested to have been because the settlement was not used during fishing season; because the lake contained no fish; because early excavations did not sieve the soil and so missed very small traces; or because fish bone is fine enough that it would have dissolved entirely in the extremely acidic local soil. A study published in 2016 finally confirmed the presence of fish, locating scraps of bone from perch, pike, and an unidentified species of Cyprinidae (the family that includes carp, tench, and minnows among others) and teeth from either pike or a member of the salmon family (either an Atlantic salmon or a brown trout). All the bone specimens found had been burnt, possibly from being disposed of in a fire after eating, and this is likely the only reason they survived the acid conditions.

One wood fossil sampled while studying the development of the wetland was found to have been chewed by a beaver.

== Human settlement on the lake ==
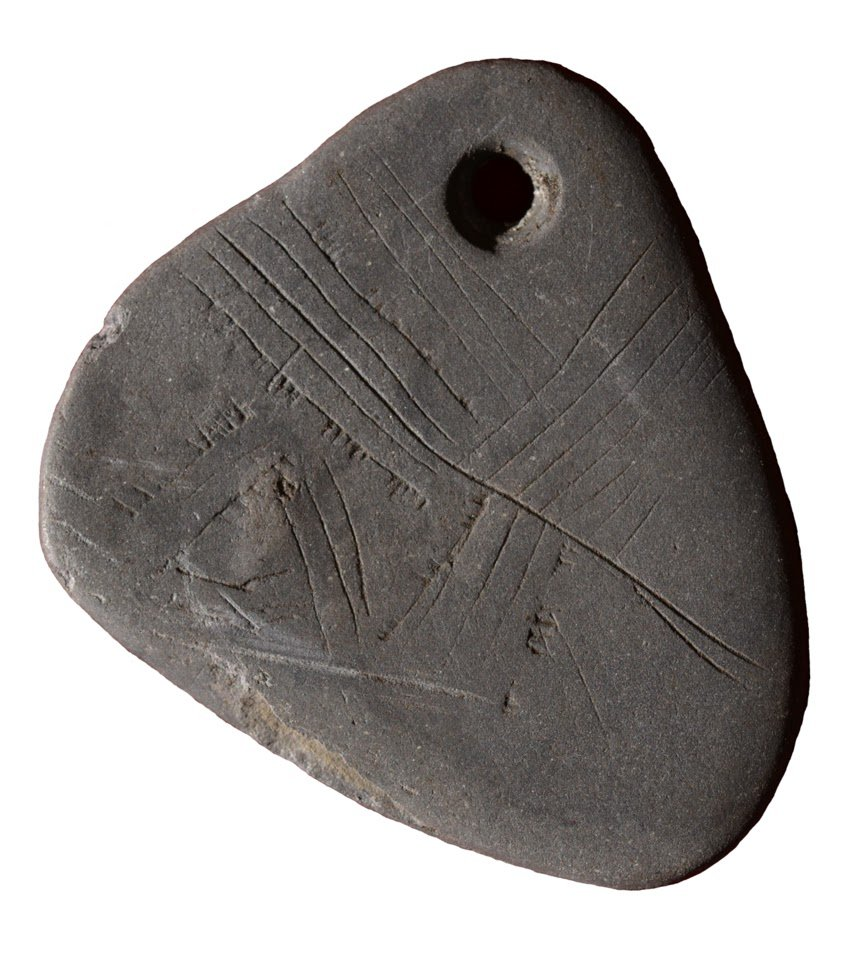
The Star Carr pendant, placed or lost in Lake Flixton around 11,000 years ago.

The earliest human presence around the lake dates to around 11,300 years ago, and there is evidence of human activity up until about 6000 years ago. The most significant settlement on the lake was Star Carr, occupied for eight centuries from around 9300 to 8500 BCE. Its inhabitants fished, hunted waterfowl, used boats (none survive, but a paddle has been found), and built three substantial wooden platforms that extended as much as 17 m (56 ft) into the lake.

Elk bones have been found in the lake, evidently put there deliberately, thought to be for religious reasons. Similar ritual depositing of elk remains in water is also known from sites of the same period in Scandinavia. An engraved stone pendant was also found about 10 m (33 ft) into the lake, either dropped or perhaps also ritually deposited.
