= Chantal Conneller =

Archaeologist

Chantal Conneller FBA FSA (born 1973) is a British archaeologist, prehistorian and academic. She is Professor of Early Prehistory at the University of Newcastle.

== Biography ==
Conneller has a BA and a PhD from the University of Cambridge. Her 2002 PhD thesis was titled "Space, time and technology: the Early Mesolithic of the Vale of Pickering, North Yorkshire".

Conneller was lecturer in Prehistoric Archaeology at Bangor University in 2005 before taking up a position as senior lecturer later that year at the University of Manchester. From 2006-2009 she was director of the Prehistoric Society. Conneller was elected as a Fellow of the Society of Antiquaries of London on 10 October 2016.

Conneller became Professor of Early Prehistory at Newcastle University in 2018.

Conneller's research focusses on the Mesolithic period. She has excavated at various Mesolithic settlements in Britain, including in the Vale of Pickering and at Star Carr, where she co-directed excavations and the Ice Age Island project at Les Varines, Jersey. She has appeared on Digging for Britain in 2011, and In Our Time episode on cave art.

In 2025 she was awarded the British Academy Grahame Clark Medal for her contributions to understanding of the Mesolithic period. In 2026, she was elected Fellow of the British Academy (FBA), the United Kingdom's national academy for the humanities and social sciences.

== Select publications ==
- Conneller, C. 2022. The Mesolithic in Britain: Landscape and Society in Times of Change. London: Routledge.
- Conneller, C. 2022. "The view at the end of the Palaeolithic world". Nature: Ecology and Evolution 6, 1591–1592.
- Elliott, B. and Conneller, C. "Masks in context: representation, emergence, motility and self". World Archaeology 52(5), 655–666.
- Burns, A., Woodward, J., Conneller, C., Reimer, P. 2022. "Footprint beds record Holocene decline in large mammal diversity on the Irish Sea coast of Britain". Nature: Ecology and Evolution 6, 1553–1563.
- Bates, J., Needham, A., Conneller, C., Milner, N., Pomstra, D., Little, A. 2022. "Flint awls at the Mesolithic site of Star Carr: Understanding tool use through integrated methods". Journal of Archaeological Science: Reports 43, 103478.
- Milner N., Conneller, C., and Taylor, B. (eds) 2018. Star Carr. Volume 1: A Persistent Place in a Changing World; Star Carr: Volume 2: Studies in Technology, Subsistence and Environment. York: White Rose Press.
- Conneller, C., and Warren, G. (eds). Mesolithic Britain and Ireland: New Approaches. Stroud: Tempus.
