= The Flying Archaeologist =

British TV series

- Genre: Documentary
- Country of origin: United Kingdom
- Original language: English
- No. of series: 1
- No. of episodes: 6

Production
- Executive producer: Diana Hare
- Producer: Eddie Anderson
- Running time: 30 minutes

Original release
- Network: BBC Four
- Release: 29 April – 20 May 2013

The Flying Archaeologist is a British television programme that aired on BBC Four on the 29 April 2013, presented by archaeologist Ben Robinson.

== History ==
The show had previously been aired on BBC One in early April 2013, however it was previously shown as a single episode for each area they were relevant to in a slot after The One Show.

The premise of the show was that Dr Ben Robinson would use aerial archaeology to show how humanity has had an effect on the landscape and offer answers towards British history.

== List of episodes ==
Episode number	Episode name	Original date aired	Episode information
1	Stonehenge: The Missing Link	29 April 2013	In this episode Ben explores Wiltshire using aerial photography to discover new evidence in the landscape of Stonehenge.
2	Broads: The Norfolk Broads	6 May 2013	In this episode Ben explores Norfolk using aerial photography to evidence why Roman Caistor St Edmund never became a modern town, and a lost Bronze Age settlement near Ormesby.
3	Hadrian's Wall: Life on the Frontier	13 May 2013	In this episode Ben explores Hadrian's Wall using aerial photography to evidence human occupation along its length.
4	The Thames: Secret War	20 May 2013	In this episode Ben explores the Thames using aerial photography to evidence a network of Trenches on the Hoo Peninsula which were not visible from the ground.
