= Michelle Alexander (archaeologist) =

Bioarchaeologist

Academic background
- Education: Durham University (BSc, PhD)
- Thesis: Exploring Diet and Society in Medieval Spain: New Approaches Using Stable Isotope Analysis (2010)

Academic work
- Institutions: University of York

Michelle Marie Alexander FSA (née Mundee) is a British bioarchaeologist. She is Professor of Bioarchaeology at the University of York.

== Early life and education ==
Alexander graduated with a BSc (Hons) in archaeology from Durham University in 2005. She completed an MSc in bioarchaeology in 2006, run jointly by the University of Manchester and University of Sheffield. In 2010, she earned a PhD from Durham University.

== Career ==
In 2011, Alexander was appointed as a research fellow in the Department of Archaeology at the University of Aberdeen. She also held positions as a visiting research fellow at Durham University and a postdoctoral researcher in the Department of Ecology and Evolutionary Biology at Cornell University. In 2012, she joined the University of York as a Lecturer in Bioarchaeology and was promoted to Senior Lecturer in 2018. In 2022, she was elected a Fellow of the Society of Antiquaries of London.

=== Research ===
Alexander specialises in the study of medieval diet through stable isotope analysis. She was part of the European Research Council-funded project The Archaeology of Regime Change: Sicily in Transition, which explored population change in medieval Sicily.
