= Sadie Watson =

British archaeologist

Sadie Watson FSA MCIfA
- Occupation: Archaeologist

Academic background
- Education: University of Bournemouth (BSc); University of Leicester (MA); University of Wales Trinity St David (PhD)
- Thesis: Digging London : a reflexive look at archaeology in the western part of the city (2016)

Academic work
- Discipline: Archaeology
- Sub-discipline: Developer-funded archaeology, Social Value and Heritage
- Institutions: Museum of London Archaeology; Chartered Institute for Archaeologists; University of York

Sadie Watson FSA MCIfA is a leading proponent of embedding social value in developer funded archaeology. She is Site Director at Museum of London Archaeology, a UK Research and Innovation (UKRI) Future Leader Fellowship holder, an Honorary Research Associate at the University of York and has played leading roles in the Chartered Institute for Archaeologists (CIfA). Sadie is not only noted for her work on social value in archaeology, but also in Equity, Diversity and Inclusion (EDI) in archaeology, and Roman London.

== Education ==
Watson was educated at the University of Bournemouth where she received a Bachelor of Sciences degree in Heritage Conservation in 1995. In 2000, she was awarded a Master of Arts (MA) degree in Archaeology and Heritage at the University of Leicester, followed by a PhD at the University of Wales Trinity St David in 2016 for a study of modern theoretical approaches to fieldwork and their relative utility within the pressured commercial archaeological environment.

== Career ==
Sadie has been a leading practitioner in field archaeology for more than two decades and has in-depth knowledge of the profession and its pressures. She began working in archaeology in 1995, and has been working at Museum of London Archaeology since 1998. She was made a Project Officer in 2009 in which role she was responsible for major sites with larger field teams, largely on multi-period sites in London.

Sadie has worked on a variety of medieval and Roman sites and is experienced in the excavation and supervision of complex urban sites. From 2008 to 2019 she worked as an Excavation Director in the City of London, and was responsible for leading the award-winning excavations at Bloomberg London.

She was Archaeologist in Residence at the MacDonald Institute, University of Cambridge, where she researched current challenges to archaeological practice, and the need for the sector to revolutionise its offering. This work then led her to gain a UK Research and Innovation (UKRI) Arts and Humanities Research Council (AHRC) Future Leader Fellowship based at the Museum of London Archaeology in which her research is aimed at reframing the narrative around value provided from development-led archaeology.

In May 2025 Sadie was one of the plenary speakers at the Chartered Institute for Archaeologists annual conference. In December 2025 she gave one of the keynote presentation at the Theoretical Archaeology Group annual meeting in York.

=== Selected publications ===
Watson's publications include:

- Towards a New Project Design Methodology for Archaeological Projects in England.
- Value from development-led archaeology in the UK: Advancing the narrative to reflect societal changes
- Public Benefit: the challenge for development-led archaeology in the UK
- Whither archaeologists? Continuing challenges to field practice
- Evidencing and Ensuring Impactful Research from Developer-Funded Archaeology

=== Awards and honours ===
Watson is an elected Fellow of the Society of Antiquaries of London (FSA), and has accredited Member of the Chartered Institute for Archaeologists (MCIfA) status.
