= Nicky Milner =

British archaeologist

Professor Nicky Milner OBE FBA FSA
- Born: 4 September 1973 (age 52)
- Citizenship: British
- Education: University of Nottingham; University of Cambridge
- Known for: Mesolithic; Star Carr
- Scientific career
- Fields: Archaeology
- Workplaces: University of York; Newcastle University
- Thesis: Seasonality information from the incremental growth of the European oyster for Ertebølle sites in Denmark (1999)

Nicola Jane Milner OBE FBA FSA (born 4 September 1973) is a British archaeologist and academic. She is head of the Department of Archaeology at the University of York. Her research focuses on the Mesolithic period, and the transition between the Mesolithic and Neolithic. She has worked at the iconic site of Star Carr in the Vale of Pickering for over 15 years, and has directed excavations at the site since 2004.

Milner was elected a Fellow of the British Academy (FBA) in 2019 and a Fellow of the Society of Antiquaries of London (FSA) in 2009.

== Early life and education ==
Milner was born on 4 September 1973 in Bridlington, Yorkshire, England. She was educated at Hunmanby Hall School, an all-girls private boarding school in Hunmanby, East Riding of Yorkshire. She studied archaeology at the University of Nottingham, graduating with a Bachelor of Arts (BA) degree in 1995. She then moved to the University of Cambridge, where she undertook a Natural Environment Research Council funder Doctor of Philosophy (PhD) degree. Her research developed a method for analysing seasonality from the shell of the European oyster, and applied this method to Danish shell midden sites. She completed her doctorate in 1999 with a thesis titled "Seasonality information from the incremental growth of the European oyster for Ertebølle sites in Denmark".

== Academic career ==
Following her PhD she was awarded a Sir James Knott postdoctoral fellowship at Newcastle University in 1999, and was employed as a lecturer at the same institution in 2001. She moved to the University of York in 2004 and was promoted to senior lecturer in 2009, and made Professor of Archaeology in 2012. She has been head of York's Department of Archaeology since 2019.

She is senior editor of Oxford Research Reviews in Archaeology, and has been the editor for Mesolithic Miscellany journal since 2006, and co-author of popular book Star Carr: Life in Britain After the Ice Age, linked to a major exhibition at the Yorkshire Museum. She is a member of the AHRC peer college, and a member of the assessment panel for the NERC radiocarbon facility.

Milner was appointed Officer of the Order of the British Empire (OBE) in the 2023 Birthday Honours for services to archaeology. She is a member of the Antiquity Trust, which supports the publication of the archaeology journal Antiquity.

=== Research ===
Milner is the principal investigator on the European Research Council funded POSTGLACIAL project, investigating the occupation of north-west Europe and how people adapted to climate change during the early post-glacial period. The major case study for this research is Star Carr and other sites surrounding Lake Flixton. Her excavations at Star Carr were featured on a special episode of the UK Time Team, and her work in 2013 on the "earliest house in Britain" was featured on several major news outlets worldwide, including the BBC in the UK, CBS in the USA and Sky News Australia.

In addition to her work at iconic Star Carr, she has also worked on shell midden sites in Ireland, Scotland, Spain and Portugal, and has co-directed excavations as Howick and Baylet.

In November 2019 Milner was Highly Commended in the category of 'Outstanding Research Supervisor of the Year' at the Times Higher Education Awards.

== Selected publications ==
- Conneller, C., Milner, N., Taylor, B. and Taylor, M. 2012. 'Substantial settlement in the European Early Mesolithic: new research at Star Carr', Antiquity 86 (334), 1004–1020.
- Milner, N., Conneller, C., Taylor, B. and Schadla-Hall, R.T. 2012. The Story of Star Carr. Council for British Archaeology.
- Milner, N., Conneller, C., Elliott, B., Koon, H., Panter, I., Penkman, K., Taylor, B., and Taylor, M. 2011. 'From Riches to Rags: Organic Deterioration at Star Carr.' Journal of Archaeological Science 38 (10), 2818-2832.
- Milner, N., Lane, P.J., Taylor, B., Conneller, C. and Schadla-Hall, T. 2011. 'Star Carr in a Postglacial Lakescape: 60 Years of Research', Journal of Wetland Archaeology 11 (1), 1-19.
- Milner, N. and Craig, O.E. 2009. 'Mysteries of the middens: change and continuity across the Mesolithic Neolithic transition'. In M.J. Allen, N. Sharples & T. O'Connor (eds), Land and People. Papers in Honour of John G. Evans (Prehistoric Society Research Paper 2). Oxford, Oxbow. 169–180.
- Milner, N., Mithen, S. and Ralston, I. 2009. 'Hunter-gatherers of the Mesolithic'. In J Hunter (ed.), The Archaeology of Britain. London, Routledge. 53-77.
- Milner, N. 2002. Incremental growth of the European Oyster, Ostrea edulis: seasonality information from Danish kitchenmiddens (British Archaeological Reports). OXford, Archaeopress.
