= Adria (disambiguation) =

Adria is a town in the Veneto region of Italy.

Adria may also refer to:

== People ==
- Adria (given name)
- Adrià, given name
- Albert Adrià Acosta (born 1968), Spanish chef
- Ferran Adrià i Acosta (born 1962), Catalan chef from Spain

== Places ==
- Adria (town), a town in the Veneto region of Italy
- Adria (region), a region in the Balkans
- Atri, Italy, a town formerly called Adria, in the Abruzzo region of Italy
- Adria (river), a former channel of the Po Delta passing by Adria, Italy
- Operational Zone of the Adriatic Littoral, known colloquially as Operationszone Adria, a German World War II district
- 143 Adria, an asteroid

== In business ==
- Adria Airways, former Slovenian flag carrier airline
- Adria Mobil, a Slovenian producer of caravans and motorhomes
- Adria oil pipeline, in central Europe
- Adria LNG, a proposed liquefied natural gas regasification terminal on the island of Krk, Croatia
- Adria (motorcycle), a German motorcycle and engine manufacturing company
- Adria, a Swiss watch brand - see Adriatica
- ADRIA, the Alternative Dispute Resolution Institute of Alberta

== Sports ==
- Adria International Raceway, an auto racing track in Adria, Italy
- Adria Mobil, cycling team
- RWB Adria, a Croatian-American soccer club in Chicago

== Other ==
- USS Adria (AF-30), an Adria-class stores ship in service with the United States Navy from 1944 to 1954

== See also ==
- Adriatic (disambiguation)
- Greater Adria, a micropaleocontinent
- Adrias, the name of several ships of the Hellenic Navy
