= Atri (disambiguation) =

Atri is a Vedic sage credited with composing hymns to Hindu deities.

Atri or Attri may also refer to:

== Places ==
- Atri, Abruzzo, a comune in Teramo, Italy
  - Atri Cathedral
  - Roman Catholic Diocese of Atri
- Atri (Odisha), a village in Odisha, India
- Atri Assembly constituency, an electoral constituency of the Bihar Legislative Assembly, India

== People ==
- Atri Kar, first Indian transgender person to take part in a civil services exam
- Akbar Atri, Iranian democracy and human rights activist
- G. V. Atri (1964-2000), Indian Kannada-language singer
- Reza Atri (born 1994), Iranian freestyle wrestler
- Vikram Atri (born 1983), English cricketer
- Manu Attri (born 1992), Indian badminton player
- Vishva Nath Attri, Indian economist and academic

== Other uses ==
- Atri: My Dear Moments, a 2020 visual novel

== See also ==
- Atria (disambiguation)
- Atris (disambiguation)
- Aitareya (disambiguation)
- Atreyee (disambiguation)
- Atreya, a Hindu sage, descendant of Atri
- Atreya (surname), an Indian surname
