= Adria (given name) =

Adria is a feminine given name, a feminine form of Adrian. Notable women and fictional characters with this name include:

== Women ==
- Adria Arjona (born 1992), Guatemalan and Puerto Rican actress
- Adria Bernardi, American novelist and translator
- Adria Dawn (born 1974), American actor, writer and producer
- Adria Engel (born 1979), American tennis player
- Adria Kain, Canadian singer
- Adria LaViolette, American archaeologist
- Adria Lawrence, American political scientist and professor
- Adria Locke Langley (1899–1983), American writer
- Adria Petty (born 1974), American director, editor, art director, and artist, daughter of rock musician Tom Petty
- Adria Santana (1948–2011), Cuban actress
- Adria Silva (born 1983), Brazilian Paralympic volleyball player
- Adria Tennor, American actress, writer, and director
- Adria Vasil, Canadian environmental journalist

== Fictional characters ==
- Adria (Stargate), a villain in the television series Stargate SG-1
- Adria the witch, a character in the Diablo video game series

== See also ==
- Adria (disambiguation)
