= Atria =

Atria may refer to:

== Science ==
- Atrium (heart) (plural: atria), an anatomical structure of the heart
- Atria (genus), a flatworm genus in the family Dendrocoelidae
- Atria (star) or Alpha Trianguli Australis, a star in the constellation Triangulum Australe

== Companies and brands ==
- Atria (company), a large Finnish food company
- Atria Convergence Technologies, an Indian telecommunications company
- Atria Management Company, a North American assisted-living company
- Atria Publishing Group, an imprint of Simon & Schuster
- Atria Software, the original maker of ClearCase
- Atria Watford, a shopping centre in Watford, Hertfordshire, UK

== Places ==
- Adria, or Atria, an Etruscan city in the Veneto region of Northern Italy
- Atri, Abruzzo, or Atria, an ancient city in the Abruzzo region of Central Italy
- Atria Park District, a mixed-use development zone in Mandurriao, Iloilo City, Philippines

== Other uses ==
- Atrium (architecture) (plural: atria), a large open space within a building
- Atria gens, an ancient Roman family
- Atria Galla, woman of ancient Rome who lived in the 1st century CE
- Atria Institute on gender equality and women's history
- Atria, a fictional planet in the TV series Star-Crossed

== See also ==
- Adria (disambiguation)
- Atri (disambiguation)
- Atrium (disambiguation)
