= Aatreya =

Aatreya may refer to:

- Acharya Aatreya (1921–1989), playwright, lyric writer and story writer in Telugu cinema
- Atreya (Devanagari:आत्रेय), ancient Rishi descended from Atri
- Atreya (surname), Indo-Nepalese Hindu patronymic surname
- Dattatreya, a Hindu deity encompassing the trinity of Brahma, Vishnu and Shiva
