= Atrium =

Atrium may refer to:

== Music ==
- "ATRIUM", a 2025 track by Toby Fox from Deltarune Chapters 3+4 OST from the video game Deltarune

== Anatomy ==
- Atrium (heart), an anatomical structure of the heart
- Atrium, the genital structure next to the genital aperture in the reproductive system of gastropods
- Atrium of the ventricular system of the brain
- Pulmonary alveolus (also known as atrium alveolus), microscopic air sac in the lungs

== Architecture ==
- Atrium (architecture), an open space within a building, either open to the sky or featuring a glass roof
  - Ancient Roman atrium, a grand entrance hall, reception room, and living room in a traditional Roman house.

=== Specific buildings ===
- Amot Atrium Tower, a tower in Ramat Gan, Israel
- Atrium, Cardiff, a University of South Wales building in Cardiff
- Atrium Building, a skyscraper in Guatemala City
- Atrium Casino, a casino in Dax, France
- Atrium Cinemas, a movie theatre in Karachi, Pakistan
- Winter Garden Atrium, a Brookfield Properties building in the World Financial Center of the World Trade Center, New York City
- Atrium on Bay, a retail and office complex in Toronto, Canada

== Companies ==
- Atrium Health, based in Charlotte, North Carolina

== See also ==
- The Atrium (disambiguation)
