= Adriatic (disambiguation) =

The Adriatic Sea is the northernmost arm of the Mediterranean Sea.

Adriatic may also refer to:

== Transport ==
- Air Adriatic, a charter airline based in Croatia

=== Ships ===
- Adriatic (ship)
  - Adriatic (1810 ship), British ship wrecked in 1822
  - Adriatic (1811 ship), U.S. ship seized by the British Royal Navy in 1812
  - SS Adriatic (1856), the last of the Collins Line steamships
  - SS Adriatic (1871), of the White Star Line
  - RMS Adriatic (1906), of the White Star Line

== See also ==
- Adriatic Plate, a tectonic plate located between the African Plate and the Eurasian Plate
- Adriatic Highway, a scenic road in Croatia and Montenegro
- Adriatic Avenue or Jadranska Avenue, an arterial highway in Zagreb, Croatia
- 2-6-4 wheel arrangement, called an "Adriatic"
- Jadran (disambiguation), Adriatic in South Slavic languages
- Adriatica, a Swiss watchmaking company
- Adriatico (disambiguation)
