= Aitareya =

Aitareya may refer to:

- Aitareya Brahmana, an expository text on the Rigveda scripture of Hinduism
- Aitareya Aranyaka, a philosophical treatise on the Rigveda
  - Aitareya Upanishad, a mystical text on the Rigveda, part of the Aranyaka

== See also ==
- Atri (disambiguation)
- Atreyee (disambiguation)
- Atreya, a Hindu sage
- Atreya (surname), Indian surname
