= Adrià =

Adrià is a Catalan masculine given name, related to the English Adrian or Hadrian. It may refer to:

- Adrià Arjona (born 1996), Spanish footballer
- Adrià Carmona (born 1992), Spanish professional footballer
- Adrià Collado (born 1972), Spanish actor
- Adrià Delgado (born 1990), water polo player from Brazil
- Adrià or Adrián Díaz (born 1990), Spanish ice dancer
- Adrià Figueras (born 1988), Spanish handball player
- Adrià Gallego (born 1990), Spanish professional footballer
- Adrià Granell (born 1986), Spanish footballer
- Adrià Gual (1872–1943), Catalan playwright and theatre businessman
- Adrià Guerrero (born 1998), Spanish footballer
- Adrià Muñoz (born 1994), Spanish footballer
- Adrià Ortolá (born 1993), Spanish professional footballer
- Adrià Pina (born 1959), Spanish painter from L’Alcudia, Valencia
- Adrià Puntí (born 1963), musician, singer-songwriter and actor

== See also ==
- Adrian
