= Eduard Canimas =

Spanish singer (born 1965)

Eduard Canimas (born 6 June 1965) is a Catalan musician and singer. He played with Adrià Puntí and with a band called Zitzània in the nineties. In 2003 he published his first solo album.

== Discography ==
With Zitzània:

- "Orquídies i ortopèdies" (1994). (Mixtape)
- "La peixera dels tòtils" (1997). Música Global

Solo:

- Canimas i rebentes (2003). A.R.T.P. Discogràfica
- Noh iha crisi (2006). Música Global
- Sagrat cor (2010). Música Global
