= ADR Institute of Canada =

Canadian non-profit organization

The ADR Institute of Canada (ADRIC), is a non-profit organization that offers alternative dispute resolution services to its members and the public across the country. It is one of the leading authorities on ADR in Canada, offering highly respected professional designations for both mediation and arbitration, with plans for a mediation and arbitration (Med-Arb) designation in the works. ADRIC has also created an established set of ADR rules and codes, outlining the principles by which its affiliated ADR practitioners commit themselves to following. Beyond promoting ADR and networking and training individuals in ADR practices, ADRIC presides as the national body of the seven regional affiliate bodies of the ADR Institutes in Canada:

- ADR Institute of Alberta (ADRIA), first signed MOU in 1996, originally as Alberta Arbitration and Mediation Society.
- ADR Institute of British Columbia (ADR BC), first signed MOU in 1996, originally as British Columbia Arbitration and Mediation Institute.
- ADR Institute of Ontario (ADRIO), first signed MOU in 1996, originally as Arbitration and Mediation Institute of Ontario Inc.
- ADR Institute of Saskatchewan (ADR SK), first signed MOU in 1996, originally as Arbitration and Mediation Institute of Saskatchewan Inc.
- ADR Atlantic Institute (ADRAI), first signed MOU in 1996, originally as Atlantic Provinces Arbitration and Mediation Institute.
- ADR Institute of Manitoba (ADRIM), signed MOU in 2013.
- Institut de médiation et d'arbitrage du Québec (IMAQ), first signed MOU in 2013.

== History ==
ADRIC's journey begins back in 1974 when the Arbitrators Institute of Canada Inc. (AIC) was incorporated. This organization was a non-profit, non-government group operating out of Toronto whose mandate was to offer the Canadian public alternative dispute resolution services. It was around the 1970s when AIC became involved in helping to establish a number of regional ADR groups across the provinces. In 1986 AIC was renamed, becoming the Arbitration and Mediation Institute of Canada (AMIC), with the aim of making the organization more national in scope. Along with the name change, AMIC would also consist of a regional representative from each affiliate group. These representatives would be elected locally, and would collects fees from their respective group's members to fund both the national and provincial organizations. In 1996 each region signed a Memorandum of Understanding with AMIC in order to make their relationship clear and establish a set of guiding principles to operate around. These MOUs were important, as AMIC was operating as a Federation and much of their work came through cooperative efforts between its regional affiliates.

In 1994 the Canadian Foundation for Dispute Resolution was founded as a non-profit alliance for business corporations and law firms pursuing ADR practices in Canada. Then, after moving its offices to Toronto in 1999, the foundation began to develop the concept of ADR Connect, providing the infrastructure and resources for people to search for ADR professionals in Canada: one of the ADR Institute's core functions today.

On August 1, 2001, the Arbitration and Mediation Institute of Canada (AMIC) and the Canadian Foundation for Dispute Resolution (CFDR) consolidated, forming the ADR Institute of Canada (ADRIC). CFDR would continue to exist as a wholly owned subsidiary of the ADR Institute to ensure references to CFDR rules of arbitration within contracts will still be valid. The MOUs originally signed in 1996 were transferred to ADRIC in 2013, and since which have also been resigned, most recently in 2019.

== ADR definition ==
There is some discussion surrounding the term ADR as to exactly what it means. Some contest that the "A" could represent alternative, appropriate, or even adaptive, dispute resolution. The debate then goes deeper, addressing what dispute resolution methods should constitute ADR. In the UK for instance, ADR involves all practices that aren't litigation or arbitration. This is not the case in Canada however. In Canada, ADR is used as an umbrella term to encapsulate all dispute resolution practices outside of litigation, such as mediation, negotiation, arbitration or restorative justice.

== ADR use in Canada ==
Since the 1960s there has been an increasing interest in North America in pursuing an alternative path to dispute resolution outside of the traditional court system. America has led the way in this regard, establishing many ADR organizations and government programs since the later half of the 20th century. However, particularly since the late 70s and early 80s, Canada too has seen a steady increase in ADR interest. The reason for this rise is likely due to a number of factors, including a shift in government respect for ADR practices, an increased awareness of the impact the adversarial court system can have on those involved in litigation, financial costs and lengthy court proceedings. Just as there is a multitude of reasons for pursuing ADR, there is also great diversity in the practice and philosophies of the different ADR methods. Many of these have evolved over time, some of which have led to the formation of nationwide ADR organizations.

=== Indigenous peoples of Canada ===
The indigenous peoples in Canada have their own traditional roots in dispute resolution that extend back for generations. These practices are as diverse as the individuals tribes themselves, each of which has their own specific take on settling disputes within their community. However, if one common thread were to be found, it would be the focus on community and restoration of communal ties during the settlement process. Such practices have, in recent years, received attention from the Canadian Federal Government, which now has efforts in place to facilitate the capacity building of such ADR practices within indigenous communities. ADR has also been pursued when dealing with land disputes between indigenous communities and the Canadian Government.

=== Canadian Legal System and Government ===
Alongside the Canadian Legal System, since the 1980s a number of initiatives have emerged focused on exploring the potential for ADR to be used to provide Canadians with another way to settle disputes. In 1988 the Canadian Bar Association launched an initiative to promote the use of ADR practices in the Canadian Legal System. The task force that came out of this effort recommended that "ADR mechanisms be implemented within the framework of the existing legal system, and that additional emphasis be placed on training and educating legal professionals to enable them to implement these mechanisms fully." The Canadian Government also recommends that dispute resolution is pursued, "the sooner, the better."

== See also ==
- ADR Institute of Alberta (ADRIA)
