= Atreyee (disambiguation) =

Atreyee may refer to any of the following:

- Atreyee river or Atrai, a river in West Bengal, India
- Atreyee D. A. V. Public School, Balurghat, India

== See also ==
- Atrai (disambiguation)
- Atri (disambiguation)
- Aitareya (disambiguation)
