= Adriatic (ship) =

Adriatic may refer to one of several ships named after the Adriatic Sea:

- Adriatic (1810 ship) was built at Sunderland, England in 1810. She sailed to the West Indies and the Cape of Good Hope. There is no evidence that she sailed to India. She was wrecked at the Cape in 1822.
- Adriatic (1811 ship) was launched in 1811 in the United States. The British Royal Navy seized her in July 1812. She was sold in 1813 and her new owners named her Vittoria. She traded with the West Indies, the Mediterranean, and the Indian Ocean. She was last listed in 1834.

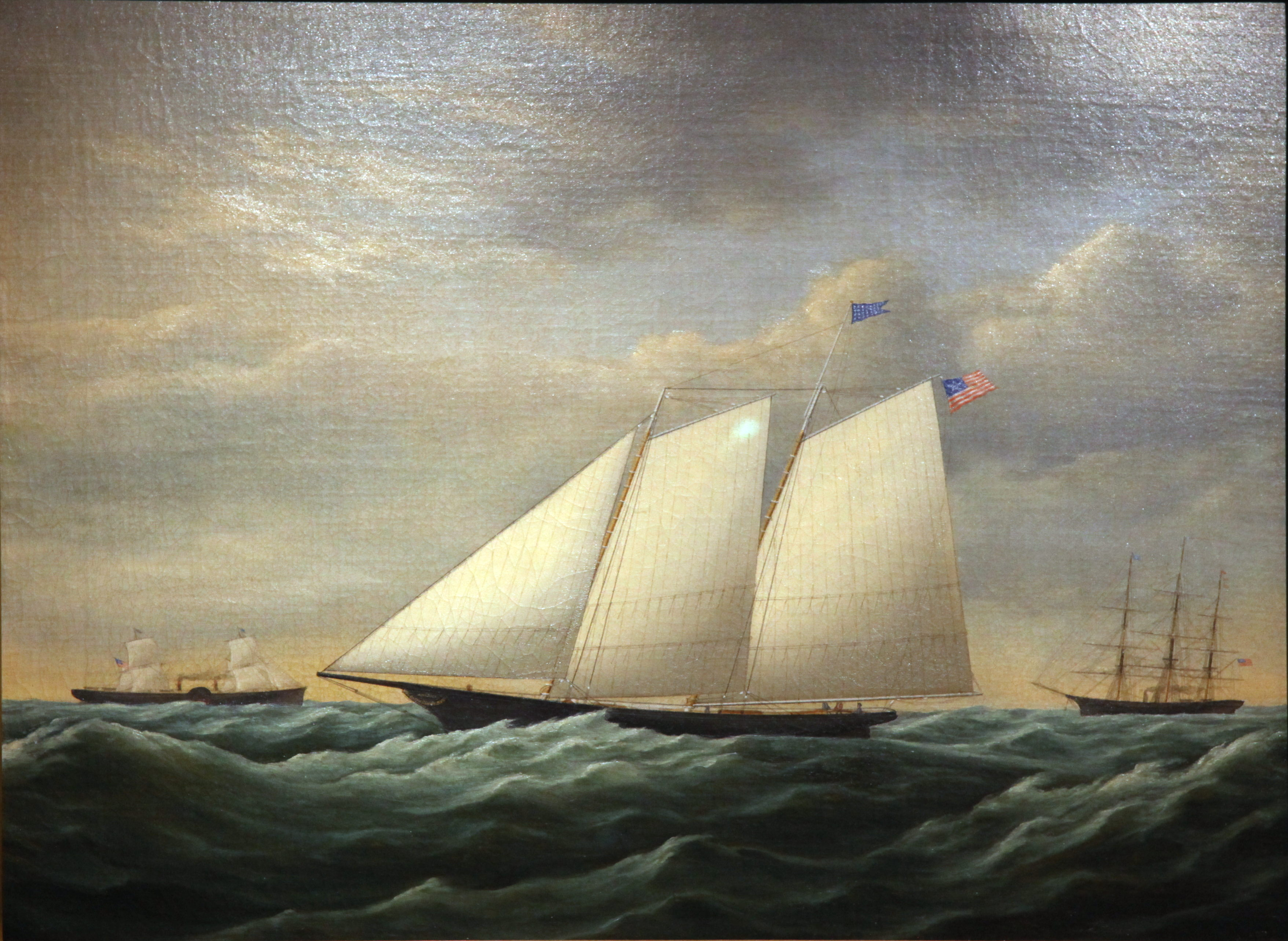
Painting showing SS Adriatic (left), America (foreground) and USS Niagara (right).

- SS Adriatic (1856 Miramichi ship) was a ship of 824 tons, launched in 1856 at Miramichi, New Brunswick, Canada. She was en route from Belfast, Maine, to Savannah, Georgia when on 2 November 1856, she collided with the Compagnie Franco-Americaine's steamship Le Lyonnais. Le Lyonnais was on her first return voyage to Le Havre, France from the Americas. Adriatic was damaged; Le Lyonnais sank with the loss of 116 lives; there were 16 survivors. On 11 September 2024, remains of Le Lyonnais were found on the Georges Bank, 200 miles (320 km) from New Bedford, Massachusetts.
- Adriatic (1856 ship) was built at New York. When she was launched in 1856, she was the largest ship in the world. She was built by the Collins Line, but was not commercially successful and was sold to a series of owners. She ultimately served as a hulk at the mouth of the Niger River, where she was abandoned in 1885.
- Adriatic (ship, 1861), ship was built in New York in 1861. the Confederate raider CSS Tallahassee captured and burned her in 1864.
- SS Adriatic (1871), operated by the White Star Line until 1898; scrapped soon after.
- SS Adriatic (1904), owned by Cockerline, Hull. She was employed as a collier in Admiralty charter, and was reported missing in October 1916 between Newport and Marseilles, and presumed a war loss.
- RMS Adriatic (1906) was an ocean liner of the White Star Line. She served as a troopship during World War I and after the war ended, she returned to passenger service. She was scrapped at Onomichi, Japan, in 1935.
