= Atris =

Atris may refer to:

- a'tris, an alternative rock band
- Atris, a fungus moth genus, nowadays synonymized with Infurcitinea
- Atris, a Jedi historian in Star Wars: Knights of the Old Republic 2
- the descendants of Atri in Rigvedic mythology
