= Adriatico =

Adriatico (Italian, Spanish, and Portuguese for the Adriatic Sea or the surrounding area) may refer to:

- Adriatico (train), an express train linking Milan and Bari, Italy, 1973–2005
- Adriatico Street, in Manila, Philippines
- MS SNAV Adriatico, a ferry serving the Naples-Palermo route for GNV
- Stadio Adriatico – Giovanni Cornacchia, a stadium in Pescara, Abruzzo, Italy
- Macario Adriatico (1869–1919), Filipino lawyer, journalist, and politician

== See also ==
- Adriatic (disambiguation)
