= Unguja Ukuu =

National Historic Site of Tanzania

Unguka Ukuu
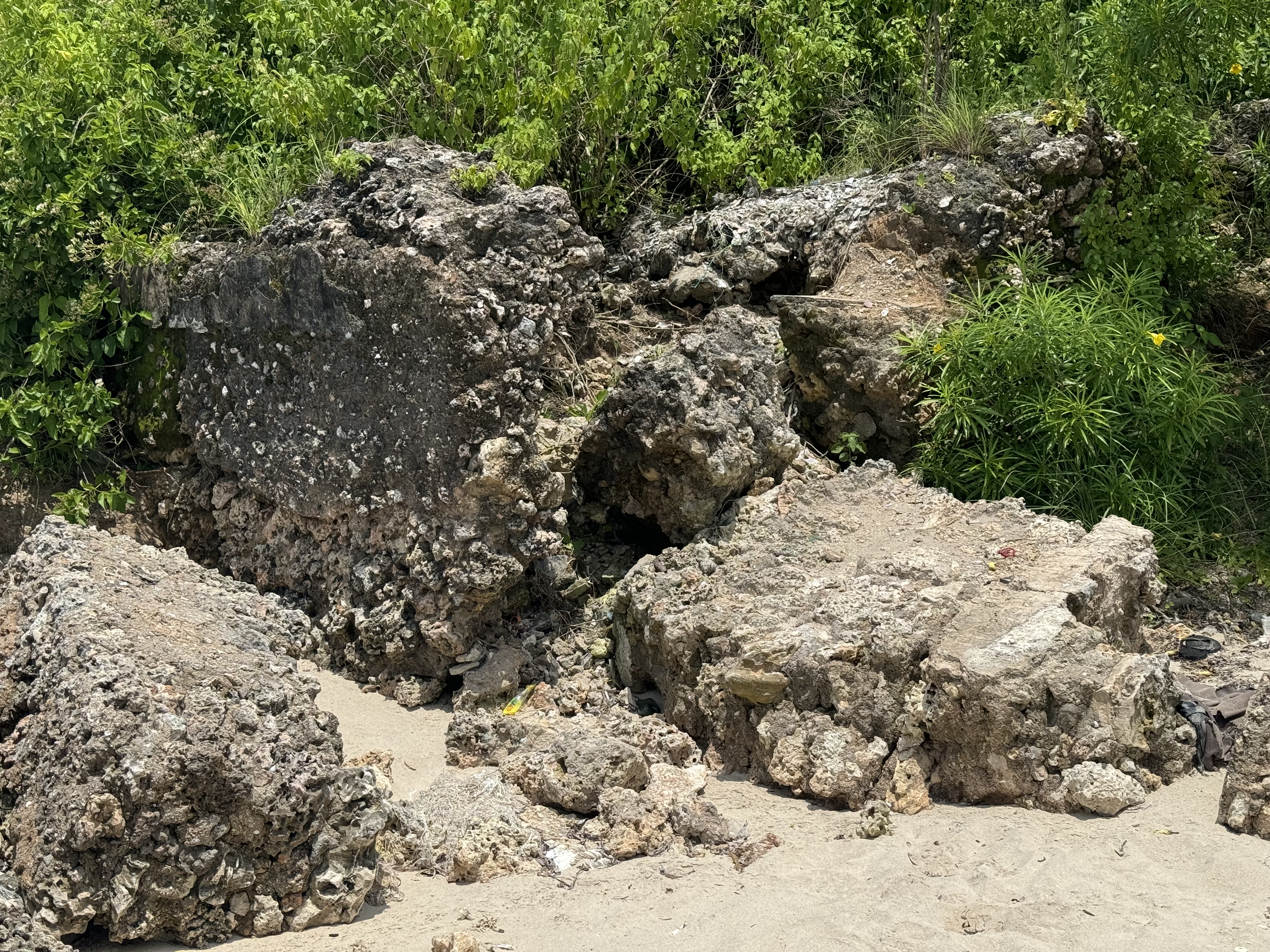
- Eroded Mosque ruin of Unguja Ukuu Historic site, Kusini DC, South Zanzibar, Tanzania

- Location within Tanzania
- 6°19′1.9194″S 39°22′27.84″E
- Type: Settlement
- Cultures: Swahili
- Location: Kusini District, Unguja South Region, Tanzania

History
- Built: 8th Century CE

Site notes
- Material: Coral rag
- Architectural styles: Swahili & Islamic
- Owner: Tanzanian Government
- Management: Antiquities Division, Ministry of Natural Resources and Tourism

National Historic Sites of Tanzania
- Official name: Unguja Ukuu Historical Town
- Type: Cultural

Unguja Ukuu (Mji wa Kale wa Unguja Ukuu in Swahili) is a historic Swahili settlement on Unguja island (Zanzibar Island), in Zanzibar, Tanzania.

== Background ==
Unguja Ukuu is an archaeological site on the island of Zanzibar. This site has yielded abundant artifacts and evidence that play out the long history of Unguja Ukuu. Artifacts found at Unguja Ukuu came from all over the world: pottery from the Far East, Near East, India, and the Southern Mediterranean region. Other items such as rings, glass, coins, iron artifacts and ivory have also been found along with a variety of animal remains. Visitors to Unguja Ukuu, centrally located off the east coast of Africa and at the edge of the Indian Ocean, left behind evidence that this place was a central trading port. Unlike the mainland this site was influenced by foreign merchants from around the world, and each left a mark on this site. Due to the trade activity here early urbanism is evident in one of the first east African trading posts. Unguja Ukuu's location was key to pursue an unconventional settlement strategy by which its inhabitants survived mostly on foods and goods that came from elsewhere since agriculture was not a main source of subsistence. As excavations continue a more diverse collection of artifacts emerge adding to the complex history of this place.

== History ==
Some members of the community claim Shirazi origins, though these stories should not be taken literally. They are representative of complex identity politics, particularly in the 19th century when Shirazi identity was used to combat notions of Arab superiority.

A notable person in the history of Unguja Ukuu is Mohammed wa Joka, an ancient land owner that is remembered in several stories and legends belonging to the local oral tradition. According to these legends, he was able to foresee the future and could cast a spell to make Unguja Ukuu invisible. By his magic, he could also identify whoever stole coconuts from his trees.

== Importance ==
The artifacts recovered show evidence that this place had experienced a long history of trade along the east coast of Africa and the Indian Ocean. Unguja Ukuu was the oldest of the earliest Swahili trading posts along the coast. Unguja Ukuu has the oldest artifacts of all of the islands in this region dating back to the sixth century. It is also a site where early Islamic influence came ashore as evident by the ruins of a mosque. There is evidence of early urbanism and international trade taking place. As its name implies, Unguja Ukuu is a Bantu phrase for “central place” recognizing its importance in trade. This site also is able to provide insight to the early contact between the Swahili and the Indian Ocean world.

== Location ==
Unguja Ukuu is an archeological site on the island of Zanzibar. Zanzibar is located south of the equator, central along the east coast of the African continent. It is positioned 25 miles from land and separated from the African continent by the Zanzibar channel (30–40 m deep). Zanzibar is the largest island of the Zanzibar archipelago. The site of Unguja Ukuu covers 16 hectares and is located between a village and a creek. It lies on the southwestern side of the island. The coordinates for this site are: -6.3172° N, 39.3744° E.

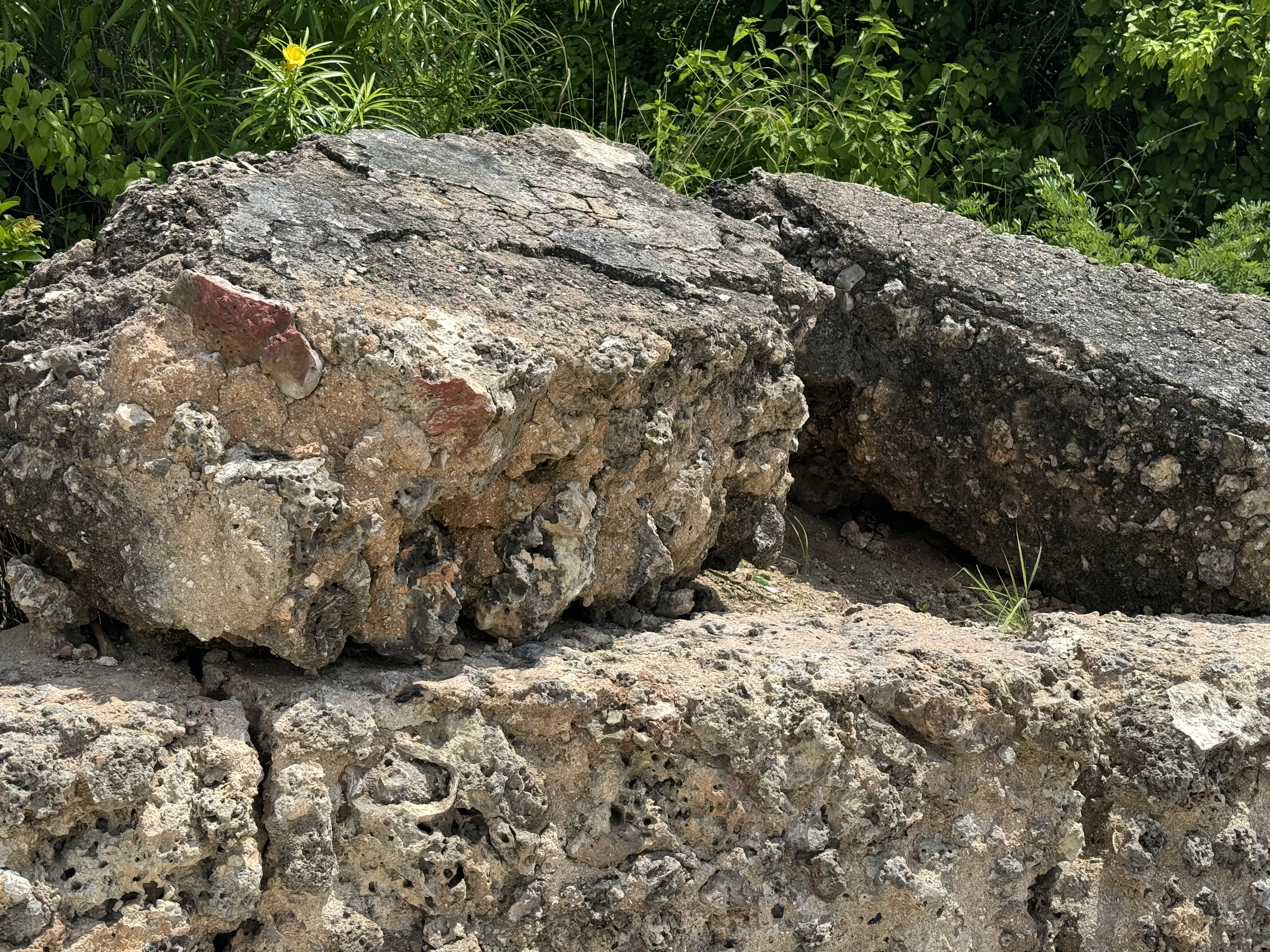
Coral rag detail Unguja Ukuu Historic site, Kusini DC, South Zanzibar, Tanzania

== History of research and account of excavations ==
Unguja Ukuu is one of two sites that had evidence of early coastal pottery, Sassanian-Islamic pottery, and ceramic bead grinders recovered from the 9th century. Unguja Ukuu takes it place along with Koma, Kwale, and Mafia as having a presence of Early Iron Working pottery. This predates Traditional Tana Ware. In addition, this site provided artifacts that date back to 500 to 700 A.D., including items imported from India, the Middle East, and the Roman state. In 1920 Pearce wrote of his observations and noted a mosque ruin at Unguja Ukuu. In addition to what he found he also conducted informant interviews and was told of 500 pieces of gold that had been discovered and taken many years earlier by Arabs. These coins had a Cufic inscription and dated to 798-9 AD minted in Baghdad. This was the first definable date that was attached to any artifact in this area. A stone well is one of the handful of monuments along the eastern African coast that have survived. Some scholars attribute Arab decedents from India for the architecture here. In 1966 Neville Chittick made his second visit (1965) to Unguja Ukuu. He recounts that he was able to collect artifacts from the surface, no digging was required. Most of what was recovered were pottery sherds. Among the sherds one stood out which was Chinese stoneware with a green glaze and ornamentation. Much of what he found was Sassanian-Islamic pottery most coming from Iran (Nishapur and Ctesiphon) form the eighth and ninth century. In 1984 Mark Horton and Kate Clark surveyed the site, 15 hectares across. Over two meters of middens were discovered providing evidence of animal bones, iron slag, daub, glass, and bead-grinders along with domestic and imported pottery. While imported pottery only constituted under five percent of the sherds recovered, they did include Sasanian-Islamic & unglazed wares, Chinese Chansha stoneware, Zhejiang Zueh Yao greenwares and Dusun jars from Guangdong. In addition to these, they also recovered one piece of Islamic white-glazed ware. They estimated that the settlement was occupied from the 8th-10th century through the 16th century. Juma and Syse recovered Islamic pottery, Chinese stoneware, two shell middens, and a possible stone fort on the east of the site. In 1991 Chami was able to excavate deep enough to reach a level that revealed the presence of Early Iron Age sherds at this site. Dating is consistent with the 5th or 6th century. Items included pottery from Egypt and African Red Slip ware from the late Roman Empire. Jeffrey Fleisher & Stephanie Wynne-Jones (2011) complied radiocarbon data on sherds found at Unguja Ukuu and other surrounding islands (8). Based on their findings the ceramic wares date back to the beginning of the 6th century (8). This new dating has pushed original dates back and give Unguja Ukuu a deeper and longer history than previously considered.

== Stratigraphy and dating ==
This area of the island's landscape comprises coral limestone but there are some areas that have very deep soft soil which is where most of the settlement artifacts were unearthed. The site is surrounded by eclectic landscape features such as ridges, a creek, the peninsula point, and flat areas. As time and technology roll on more aggressive recovery methods were used like coring, but core drilling is in some cases considered questionable due to irregularities in topography to suggest general chrono-stratigraphy of the site on soil coloration. A large excavation project was initiated and yielded a great many artifacts and structural details that gave a clearer picture of the social mapping of Unguja Ukuu.

SAREC is a regionally sponsored program that goes by the name Eastern Africa: “Urban Origins in Eastern Africa”. This program pursued archaeology on Zanzibar during four seasons, 1989–1993. During this time a great deal of excavation and recovery was done at a scale much larger than preceding visits. Due to the different regions in this site regarding typography the site was divided up in to numerous areas assigned by letters covering 410m² and examining 11,500m² of sifted deposits. Area A is 2 x 1 x 1.7m large and nine layers were identified. Layer 2 at 9–30 cm deep Sgraffiato pottery with incisions and blue white porcelain bowl fragments were found. Layer 4 at 40–70 cm deep, revealed imported pink pottery sherds of Sgraffiato and green monochrome, these dated to 1430-1650 A.D. Layer 5 at 70–86 cm deep other pottery was found but white stoneware from the Tang dynasty was found, dated to 618-908 A.D. Layer 6 at 86–100 cm deep produced many blue-green pottery sherds and charcoal samples tested to be from 600 to 770 A.D. The next layers show evidence of pottery and it is not until Layer 9 (1.42-1.17 cm) that they discovered a grave with two individuals, with suggested dates of 1440-1600 A.D. Most of these area sites are similar and a few stand out as yielding significant finds. Unit B in Layer 3 (30–50 cm deep), brown fabrics along with blue-green glazed ware, and a fragment of olive-green glazed Chinese stoneware. Layer 4 (5–66 cm deep), notable items are Changsha stoneware, poly-chrome ware from the Islamic period and what appears to be six copper coins. There were also more copper coins found in Layer 6. Layer 8 produced Changsha painted stoneware from 700 to 800 A.D. Layer 11 (135–165 cm deep) had provided rare thin walled pink earthenware. In Layer 14 & 15 (185–270 cm deep) had early pieces of glass. Units C-E discoveries were mostly sherds and charcoal, but at 21 cm deep in Unit C a portion of a grindstone was unearthed. Units F-I discoveries. Unit J at 35–44 cm deep have way to a fragment of a Longquan green celadon bowl from the Mind dynasty dating to the 14th -16th century. Layer 6 at 55–64 cm deep provided 4 small silver coins. Layer 12 at 91–131 cm deep revealed “Susa ware” fabric from the 7th century. Layer 14 at 131–141 cm deep showed evidence of late Roman period, late 5th century. Unit K at Layer 8 had a juvenile's skeleton, at 50–60 cm deep.

These are only some of the Unit sites that were excavated. This excavation was so large that is would be difficult to place all findings with in this forum. Many of the Units provided pottery sherds, charcoal, middens, and animal remains, and added to the previous work done, Unguja Ukuu is a rich and diverse participant in the domestic and international trade networks in their time. Finds & Artifacts • Sassanian Islamic pottery & Chinese stone wares, stone building • Glazed pottery • Basal shell middens from two areas • Gold coins from Iran approx. 900 yo 1866 discovered • Glassware, beads, alabaster, early iron working pottery & various metals • Early Iron Age sherds • African red slip ware of the Roman Empire

== Relevance of the finds to broader debates ==
The gold Cufic coins from the Abbasite dynasty found are of great importance since this is the earliest solidly dated object from this area of the coast. Some pottery, stone vessels, and glass material and beads of antiquity recovered at Unguja Ukuu are identified as coming from India, the Persian Gulf area and the Mediterranean region, and even north-western Europe. Trade networks were an important part of urban development in the Indian Ocean region. These early trade ports along the eastern coast of Africa were privy to advantages from their location in the sea and their distance from the mainland. These factors led to favorable trading centers. It is understandable that previous writers have mentioned that the influence of the world has left Unguja Ukuu almost void of personal identity and tradition.

== See also ==
- Historic Swahili Settlements
- National Historic Sites in Tanzania
- Swahili architecture
