= The Atrium =

The Atrium may refer to:

- A group of quick-service restaurants at D. H. Hill Library
- A shopping centre at Overport
- A shopping centre and office complex at 50 Church Street, in Cambridge, Massachusetts
- The institutional repository of the University of Guelph

== See also ==
- Atrium (disambiguation)
