= HMS Avenger (1804) =

Sloop of the Royal Navy

History

United Kingdom
- Name: Thames
- Launched: 1803, Thames
- Fate: Sold May 1804

United Kingdom
- Name: HMS Avenger
- Acquired: May 1804 by purchase
- Commissioned: June 1804
- Fate: Wrecked 8 October 1812

General characteristics
- Tons burthen: 390 (bm)
- Sail plan: Sloop
- Complement: 80
- Armament: 2 × 9-pounder chase guns + 18 × 24-pounder carronades

HMS Avenger was the collier Thames, launched in 1803, that the Royal Navy purchased in 1804 and renamed. During her service she captured a number of prizes. She also captured one French privateer and participated in the capture of the Danish island of Anholt. She wrecked at St. John's, Newfoundland on 8 October 1812.

== Royal Navy ==
Commander Thomas white commissioned Avenger in June 1804 for the North Sea. On 14 April 1806 Avenger sailed for Newfoundland.

On 17 December 1806 Avenger destroyed the French privateer cutter Hazard. The encounter occurred in the Channel. Hazard, of 16 guns, had mistaken Avenger for a merchantman (which she had been), and ran into Avenger to board. Hazard sank before British or French boats could be gotten out, taking with her 46 men of her crew of 50; two British sailors also died in the encounter. Hazard was a cutter, eight days out of Morlaix. She had not captured anything. Her captain and five men were saved.

Avenger served on the Halifax, Nova Scotia station in 1807.

On 3 May 1808 Avenger sailed for Newfoundland. Between February and April 1809 she was at Plymouth, undergoing fitting for service in the Baltic.

On 18 May 1809 the 64-gun third rate HMS Standard, under Captain Askew Paffard Hollis, the 36-gun frigate Owen Glendower, the three sloops Avenger, Ranger, and Rose, and the gunvessel Snipe captured Anholt. A party of seamen and marines under the command of Captain William Selby of Owen Glendower, with the assistance of Captain Edward Nicolls of the Standard's marines, landed. The Danish garrison of 170 men put up a sharp but ineffectual resistance that killed one marine and wounded two; the garrison then capitulated. The British took immediate possession of the island. Hollis stated that Anholt was important as a source of water to the Navy, and as a good anchorage for merchant vessels going to or coming from the Baltic.

Avenger captured a Danish boat on 29 May 1809. Then on 9 August Avenger captured Driftrigheden, Ebenetzer, and Schooner No.8. On 17 October Avenger captured Three Sisters, Christian and Margarethe, Norsamheid, Carin Catherina, and Die Keine Hoffnung.

On 11 May 1810 Avenger sailed again for Newfoundland.

Commander White was promoted to post captain on 7 August 1810. Commander Urry Johnson assumed command.

On 27 April 1811 Avenger captured the American vessel Vigilant.

Avenger sailed for Newfoundland on 26 March 1811 and again on 19 May 1812.

On 18 June 1812 Avenger captured an unnamed brig.

On 12 July 1812, shortly after the outbreak of war with the United States, Avenger detained the American ships Adriatic, Pochahontas, and Triton. (Note: Avenger's crew received a grant of 29/30 of the proceeds of the sale of all three vessels. A first-class share was worth £989 6s; a sixth-class share, that of an ordinary seaman, was worth £23 1s 4d. That amount was more than an ordinary seaman's wage for a year.)

On 14 July Avenger captured the American ship Arab. (Note: A first-class share of the prize money was worth £545 6s 8d; a sixth-class share was worth £12 15s 7d.)

Lloyd's List reported in October 1812 that Avenger had captured Adeline, sailing from London to Bath, Maine, but that the USS Constitution had recaptured Adeline and sent her into the United States. (Note: Adeline, J.Holland, master, of 305 tons (bm), had been built in Boston in 1806.) Avenger had captured Adeline on 7 August and Constitution had recaptured her on 15 August.

Also in October Lloyd's List reported that Avenger had detained and sent into Newfoundland two vessels, Gleaner, which had been sailing from Lisbon for Boston, and Adriatic, which had been sailing from Corunna to New York. Gleaner was captured on 25 July.

== Fate ==
Avenger sailed from St. John's, Newfoundland on 6 October 1812, but bad weather led Commander Johnson to attempt to return in the evening of 8 October. Wind drove her aground in the narrows and she was unable to get off despite attempts to lighten her and use kedge anchors. The wind and waves pounded her, opening leaks. Although the crew manned the pumps throughout the night the water rose. In the morning boats came out from St. John's and were able to rescue the entire crew by 9a.m.
