= Stephanie Wynne-Jones =

Archaeologist

Stephanie Wynne-Jones is an Africanist archaeologist, whose research focuses on East African material culture, society and urbanism. She is Jennifer Ward Oppenheimer Professor of the Deep History and Archaeology of Africa at the University of Cambridge, she is also the Mandela Magdalene Memorial Fellow. She was previously Professor and Head of the Department of Archaeology at the University of York and worked as assistant director of the British Institute in Eastern Africa (2005–2008) and remains a Trustee and Member of the BIEA Governing Council. In 2016, Wynne-Jones was elected to Fellowship of the Society of Antiquaries of London. Wynne-Jones is one of the Core Group at the Danish National Research Foundation Centre of Excellence in Urban Network Evolutions (Urbnet), Aarhus University. Between 2015 and 2017 she was a Pro Futura Scientia Fellow at the Swedish Collegium for Advanced Study, Uppsala.

== Research ==
Wynne-Jones' research has explored the medieval history of eastern Africa, with a focus on the Swahili coast and the caravan trade that connected it with the African interior. She has directed a series of projects across east Africa, including at Kilwa Kisiwani in southern Tanzania, at Vumba Kuu on the Kenya coast, on Mafia Island, at Ujiji by Lake Tanganyika and on Zanzibar. Her 2016 monograph draws on these multiple research projects to develop the idea of a distinctive system of value and engagement with material culture to be found on the precolonial Swahili coast. She is joint editor with Adria LaViolette of The Swahili World.

She is part of a network that have been exploring the Global Middle Ages and has co-written a response to Gordon Childe's seminal article What Happened in History? Her current research project examines the urban ecology of early settlement on Zanzibar. Wynne-Jones research also focuses on archaeological theory - exploring social complexity by challenging the idea unilineal social progress through archaeology.

=== Excavation ===
Wynne-Jones has directed excavations at multiple sites across eastern Africa. These include:

- Songo Mnara, a stone town in Tanzania which is designated as a UNESCO World Heritage Site. Her excavations at the site have applied multiple methodologies to exploring the uses of space across the 14th–16th century Swahili town. Wynne-Jones has focused in particular on the domestic spaces and how they were inhabited and used as part of domestic activity and external trade. Together with Jeffrey Fleisher she has also published extensively on the site itself and the methodologies used to recover traces of daily life.
- Vumba Kuu, a site on the southern coast of Kenya. Wynne-Jones' work here has explored the materiality of historical traditions at the site and how the histories rest on practices and priorities of life at Vumba.
- At Unguja Ukuu, an archaeological site on the island of Zanzibar, Wynne-Jones has been exploring the layout of the site and experimenting with ways of recovering high-resolution chronologies of urban life.

=== Objects and materials ===
Wynne-Jones has a particular interest in objects and materials and has published extensively on the ways that people interacted with material culture in the African past. She has published on the role of money and the ways that coinage was part of a wider set of objects that held value through the ways people interacted with them. Together with Jeffrey Fleisher she has explored the ceramic dataset of the Early Tana tradition. With Jason Hawkes, she has explored the lapidary trade in the east African coast and suggested that connections with India began in the first millennium AD.

=== Co-production ===
Wynne-Jones was Principal Investigator for CONCH (Co-Production Networks for Community Heritage in Tanzania). This project explored the built environment of the Swahili coast to further understanding of the area's past, both locally and globally. She is lead on community production and material culture for Rising From the Depths, an AHRC-funded project exploring the potential for tourism through maritime heritage on the east African coast. She has advocated for greater depth in understanding of how coastal communities interact with sites and objects relating to their heritage.

== Education ==
Wynne-Jones was awarded a PhD by the University of Cambridge in 2005, for a thesis exploring the settlement of the Kilwa region during the period of urbanisation at Kilwa Kisiwani. Her BA(Hons) in Archaeology was from the University of Bristol (1995-1998), followed by an MPhil in African Archaeology at the University of Cambridge.
