= Atrai =

Atrai may be refer to:

- Atrai River or Atreyee River, a trans-boundary river between Bangladesh and India
- Atrai Upazila, a upazila of Naogaon District, Bangladesh
- Daihatsu Atrai, the minivan version and also a flagship model of Daihatsu Hijet
- Hatra, ancient city

== See also ==
- Atreyee (disambiguation)
