= Fabio Hurtado =

Spanish contemporary painter

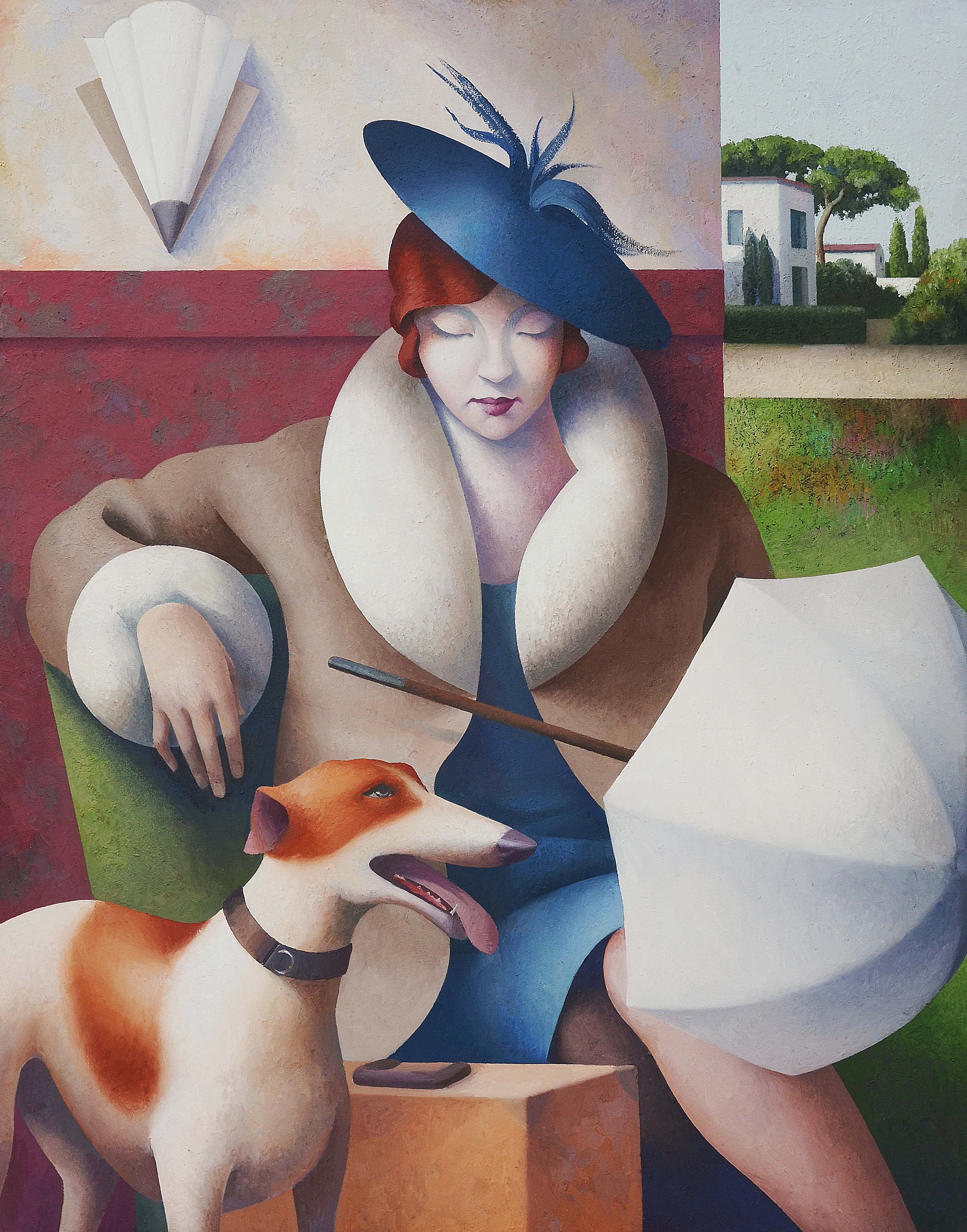
Un Viaje en Toscana, by Fabio Hurtado, 114 x 81 cm, oil on canvas

Fabio Hurtado (Madrid 1960–) is a Spanish contemporary painter, known for an intimate work that shows the feminine universe in an urban context at the beginning of industrial modernity. During his career Hurtado has received important awards and distinctions. In 2004 six of his works were chosen to illustrate a philatelic series entitled "Women and reading", issued by Correos de España to enhance the cultural integration of women in this country in the twentieth century. The refined drawing, the underlying emotionality, and a certain cinematographic air have deserved praise in Hurtado's artwork.

== Life and career ==
Hurtado was born in Madrid on January 26, 1960 to an Italian mother and a Spanish father. Inclined to the arts from a young age, he entered the Faculty of Fine Arts at the Complutense University of Madrid. In 1984 he graduated and established his first studio as a painter and photographer. For years he combined his teaching work with creative production to achieve international recognition exposing his work in Europe, the United States and Asia.

== Distinctions ==
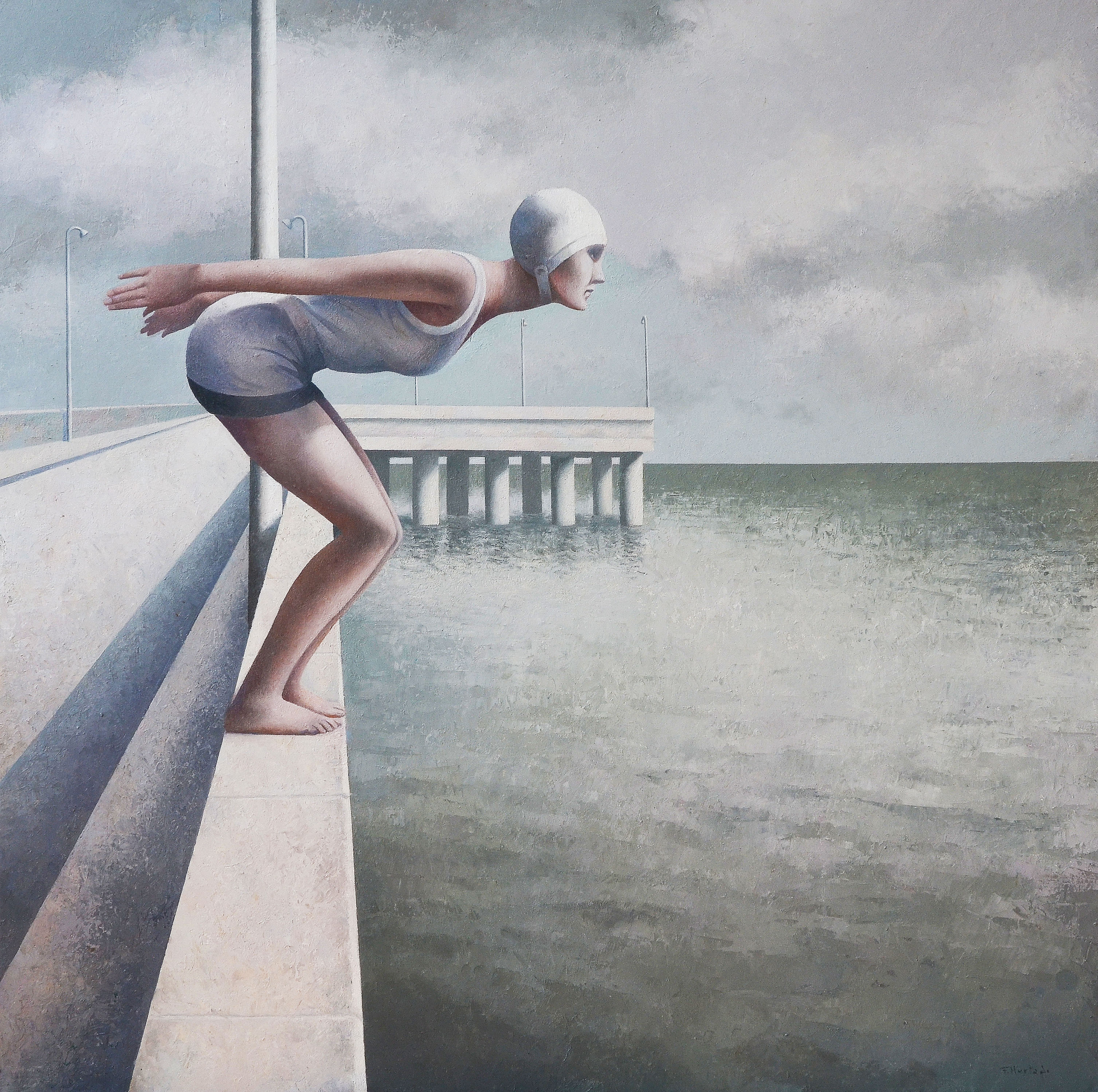
The Big Crossing, by Fabio Hurtado, 150 x 150 cm, oil on canvas

In 1995 the artist is admitted to the academic senate of the Academy of Modern Art in Rome. In the same year Hurtado received from Queen Sofía of Spain the Medal of Honor awarded to him as well as to another nine artists (including Adrià Pina, Elena Negueroles and Raúl Urrutikoetxea) at the 10th edition of the BMW painting prize award ceremony. Also in 1995 Hurtado received a First Medal for Painting at the Salon de Otoño from the Spanish Association of Painters and Sculptors (AEPE). In 1998 one of his pieces makes the cover of the Financial Times′ Telecoms World magazine. Years later the Ulster Museum acquires Hurtado's piece Three Seated Women and a Dog (1997) for its fine art collection. More recently the daily newspaper La Vanguardia chooses one of Hurtado's paintings to illustrate the cover of its cultural supplement (Culturals) published to celebrate 2017's Book Day. Fabio Hurtado's name has been included in several dictionaries and reference books on Spanish art. An essay on his art, as well as anthologies of his paintings were published in 1998 and 2007.

== Recent exhibitions ==
- 2007 Fabio Hurtado - Exhibition at Albemarle Gallery, London, UK
- 2013 Solo exhibition, Galería Alfama Madrid
- 2016 Sala Rusiñol, Barcelona; Solo exhibition 'Tiempos modernos
- 2017

- until Jan 10: Exposició Nadal 2017 "Ara és el moment", Galería Sala Rusiñol, Barcelona
- May 4 to Jun 3: “INDRETS SOMIATS” exhibition by Fabio Hurtado & Leo Wellmer, Galería Jordi Barnadas, Barcelona: .
- Ago 5: “Fotogrammi – Diario di un viaggio intimo”, di Fabio Hurtado e Lucia Oliva, Civica Galleria di Palazzo Rocca, Chiavari, Genova, Italia
- Sep 2: collective exhibition ‘El Retorno’ gallery El Aljibe de Haría, Las Palmas, Spain
- Nov 23: collective exhibition Proyecto Tristán, Gran Teatro del Liceo en Barcelona

- 2018

- Jan-Feb: collective exhibition, “Lanzarote Art Gallery”
- Retrospective exhibition, Fabio Hurtado : un viatge interior; Museu de la Ciutat Casa de Polo, Ajuntament de Vila-real, Castelló
- May 18–21: Art Revolution Taipei fair:European masters, Taipei World Trade Center
