= André Granet =

French architect (1881-1974)

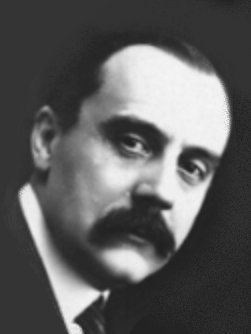
- Granet circa 1930
- Born: 6 May 1881; Paris, France
- Died: 27 October 1974 (aged 93)
- Occupations: Architect; Exhibitions entrepreneur

André Granet (born Paris 6 May 1881: died 27 October 1974) was a French architect who also specialized in organizing and designing major exhibitions. In addition he manifested a passion for aviation.

== Architecture ==
André Granet, the architect:
Some of his better known commissions
- Salle Pleyel
- Atrium Casino
- Hôtel Splendid
- "La Villa Florentine" built at Maisons-Laffitte for M. Trussy (1905)
- Gnome et Rhône factory at Gennevilliers (1906-1913)

André Granet practiced as an architect in France between 1905 and 1971, working for the first part of his career alongside his father, the architect Louis Granet. Granet worked on numerous public buildings and "national palaces". He was a high-profile practitioner of Art Deco architecture in France.

== Passionate about aviation ==
Passionate about aviation, with Robert Esnault-Pelterie (1881-1957) he founded the "Air Locomotion Manufacturers' Association" ("Association des Industriels de la Locomotion Aérienne"), forerunner of GIFAS.

With Esnault-Pelterie he instigated the first "Exhibition of Aerial Locomotion" which took place, in Paris, at the Grand Palais in 1909, and which became the forerunner of the Paris Air Show. For many years he would be responsible for commissioning the exhibits and contributed to the staging of the air shows.

== Paris Motor Show ==
For many years, starting in 1909, Granet was responsible for the interior design of the Grand Palais for the Paris Motor Show. He contributed a varied succession of lighting and signage, reflecting advances in the relevant technologies.

== Eiffel connection ==
In 1922 he married a grand daughter of Gustave Eiffel, and was thereafter commissioned for arranging a succession of displays and illuminations involving the Eiffel Tower, most notably for the 1937 Paris EXPO.
