= Bhikhan Lal Atreya =

Indian writer and scholar

- Born: 1897; Village Bandar Zudda, SaharanpurNorth-west Provinces, British India
- Died: 1977 (aged 79–80)
- Occupations: Writer; Scholar; Academic Parapsychologists, Professor of Philosophy
- Known for: Writings on Indian philosophy
- Spouse: Mrs. Laxmi Atreya
- Children: 1. Dr. Shanti Prakash Atreaya(Rustamay Hind /writer of Yog Manovigyan) 2. Dr. Prabha Atreya/Joshi 3. Dr. Jagat Prakash Atreya 4. Sudha Atreya/ Panday
- Awards: Padma Bhushan

Bhikhan Lal Atreya (1897–1967) was an Indian writer and scholar, known for his writings on the Hindu scripture, Yogavasishtha. He was a professor of philosophy at Banaras Hindu University and did academic research on parapsychology and mysticism. The Yogavāsistha and Its Philosophy, The essence of Yogavāsiṣṭha and An Introduction to Parapsychology are some of his notable books. The Government of India awarded him the third highest civilian honour of the Padma Bhushan, in 1957, for his contributions to literature and education.

== Selected bibliography ==
- Bhikhan Lal Atreya (1939). The Yogavāsistha and Its Philosophy. Indian Bookshop.
- Bhikhan Lal Atreya (1952). An Introduction to Parapsychology: Collected Papers on Psychical Research. Kumar Publication.
- Bhikhan Lal Atreya (1952). The Spirit of Indian Culture. International Standard Publications.
- Bhikhan Lal Atreya (1962). The essence of Yogavāsiṣṭha. Dershana printers.
- Bhikhan Lal Atreya (1964). Bhāratīya nīti-śāstra kā itihāsa. Hindī Samiti.
- Bhikhan Lal Atreya; Rama Shanker Srivastava; Shanti Prakash Atreya, J. P. Atreya (1977). Philosophical reflections. Oriental Publishers & Distributors.
- Bhikhan Lal Atreya (1981). The Philosophy of the Yoga-vasistha: A Comparative, Critical and Synthetic Survey of the Philosophical Ideas of Vasistha as Presented in the Yoga-Vasistha Maha-Ramayana. Darshana Printers.
- Bhikhan Lal Atreya; Sampūrṇānanda Saṃskr̥ta Viśvavidyālaya (2002). Vāsiṣṭhadarśanam. Sampūrṇānanda Saṃskr̥ta Viśvavidyālaye. ISBN 9788172700836.

== See also ==
- Yogavasishtha
