= Greater Adria =

Paleomicrocontinent

Greater Adria was a paleomicrocontinent that existed from 240 to 140 million years ago. It is named after Adria, a geologic region found in Italy, where evidence of the microcontinental fragment was first observed. Greater Adria's size can be compared to that of modern day Greenland.

== History ==
The continent was revealed to the public in September 2019. The continent was uncovered through simulations of plate tectonics with the GPlates software.

== Geologic history ==
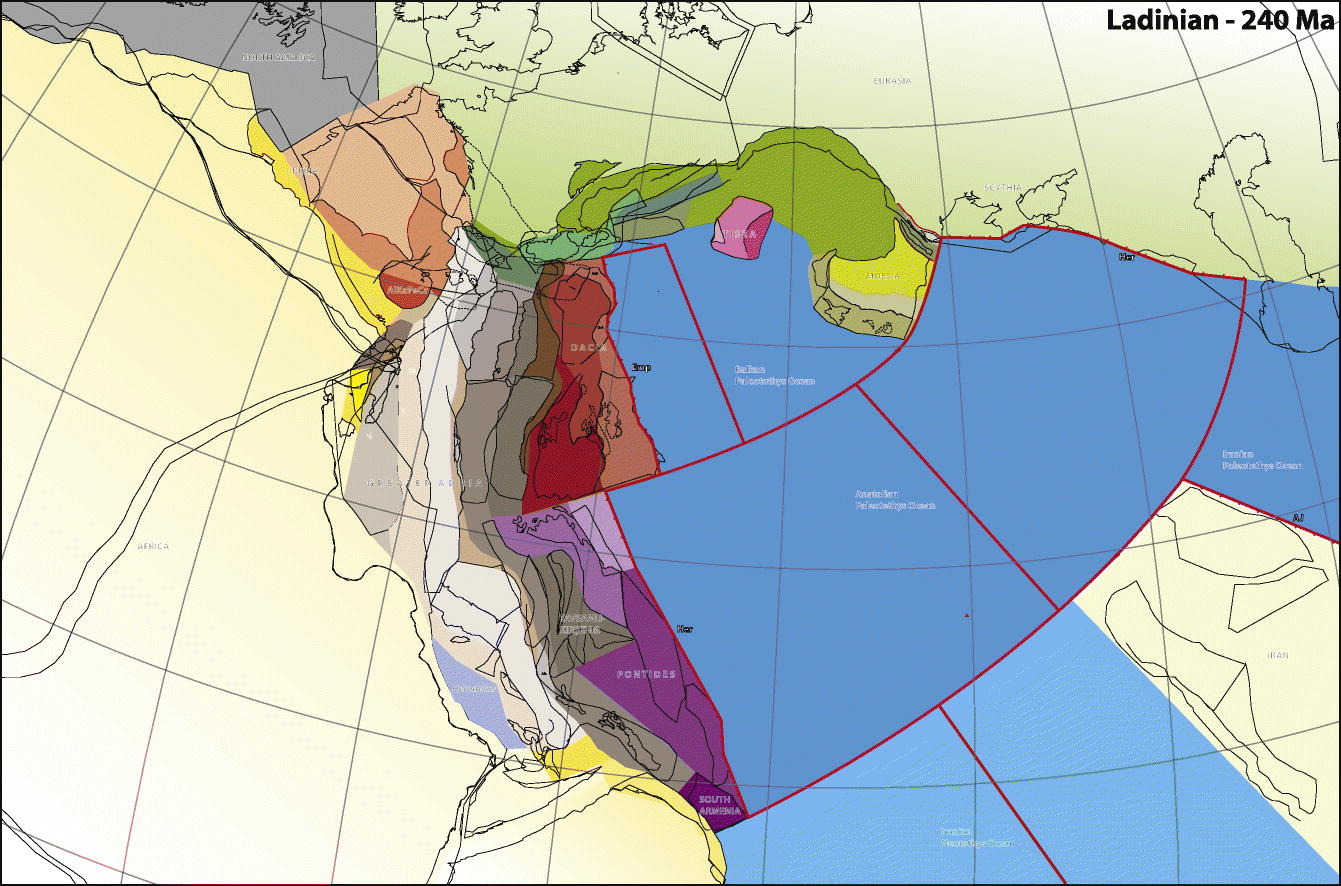
Portion of North Africa that rifted to form Greater Adria

The continent formed by rifting from the north Africa portion of the supercontinent of Gondwanaland 240 million years ago. It broke free into the Neo-Tethys Ocean and headed towards Laurasia. About 200 million years ago, the microcontinent of Iberia separated from the bulk of Greater Adria. The continent ended up accreting to the south Europe portion of the supercontinent of Laurasia, 140 million years ago. It then began subducting under it 100 million years ago. At that time the Po River flowed further north towards present-day Switzerland.

== Current geography ==
The former crust of Greater Adria now forms parts of the Alps, the Apennines, the Balkans, Anatolia, and the Caucasus. Including the Iberian microcontinent, it also forms Iberia, the Pyrenees, and Occitania. Excluding Iberia, the only part remaining relatively intact is a strip running from Turin and Istria to the Heel of Italy, under the Adriatic. Most of the subducted remains are some 1,000 km (620 mi) under Europe, deep in the earth.

== See also ==
- Mauritia (microcontinent), a sunken microcontinent under Mauritius
- Zealandia, a sunken continent under New Zealand
