= Atrium Building =

High-rise building in Guatemala City

Coordinates: 14.591497077986359°N 90.50329868976627°W

The Atrium Building (Edificio Atrium) is a skyscraper in Guatemala City, Guatemala. It is a residential building located at Diagonal 6 16-01, in Zone10 of the city. At 84 metres or 275 feet , as of 2009 it is the second tallest building in Guatemala. The building has 28 floors and 138 rooms and was completed in 2008.

It was designed by Solares y Lara Arquitectos and constructed by the Aicsa Corporation.
