= Rasana Atreya =

Indian English-language author

- Born: Bangalore, Karnataka, India
- Education: Osmania University, Hyderabad; Marquette University, US
- Occupation: Writer
- Known for: Tell A Thousand Lies, Temple Is Not My Father
- Website: rasanaatreya.com

Rasana Atreya is an Indian English-language author. Her debut novel Tell A Thousand Lies was shortlisted for the "2012 Tibor Jones South Asia prize." She is also the India ambassador for the Alliance of Independent Authors.

== Biography ==
Rasana completed her schooling at Kendriya Vidyalaya schools across the country and has a B.E. in Instrumentation engineering from Osmania University, India, and M.S. in Computer engineering from Marquette University, Milwaukee, United States. She is also a trained 'Volunteer Rape Crisis' counselor by Bay Area Women Against Rape organization. She is the founder of The India Readathon, a platform which aims to introduce readers to self-published books (ebooks and audio) set in the Indian subcontinent (India, Pakistan, Sri Lanka, Bangladesh, Burma, Nepal and Maldives). Her other novels include Temple Is Not My Father, 28 Years A Bachelor, and Valley Isle Secrets (a Kindle Worlds novella based on Toby Neal's Lei Crime Series).

== Critical acclaim ==
Tell A Thousand Lies was shortlisted for the 2012 Tibor Jones South Asia Award. While her first three novels handle woman-centric issues, with Valley Isle Secrets, she has ventured into thriller genre.

Rasana declined a traditional publishing contract to self-publish her work. She has been interviewed on self-publishing by many major publications in India.

== Workshops and panels ==
- Panelist, Navigating the Road to Self Publishing, Times Lit Fest. 4 December 2016 (with Neal Thompson, Director of Author and Publishing Relations, Amazon)
- Workshop. The Art of Self Publishing at the Hyderabad Lit Fest, 24 January 2015.
- Panelist on publishing, Hyderabad Literary Festival 20 January 2013 (with Kulpreet Yadav)
- Panelist on publishing, Jaipur Literary Festival 24 January 2013 (with Meru Gokhale, Editor-in-Chief, Random House, UK; Alexandra Pringle, Editor-in-Chief Bloomsbury; Rick Simonson, Artemis Kirk)

== Bibliography ==
- Tell A Thousand Lies
- Temple Is Not My Father
- 28 Years A Bachelor
- Valley Isle Secrets
