= Adria LaViolette =

American archaeologist

- Occupation: Archaeologist

Academic background
- Education: Washington University in St. Louis

Academic work
- Discipline: Archaeology of the Swahili
- Institutions: University of Virginia

Adria Jean LaViolette is an American archaeologist at the University of Virginia. She is a specialist in Swahili archaeology and is the joint editor of The Swahili World (Routledge, 2018).

== Early life and education ==
Adria LaViolette is one of the four children of Paul A. LaViolette Jr., and Jean Scully LaViolette.

She received her BA in 1977 from Yale University, her MA in 1981 from Washington University in St. Louis. Her PhD was also from Washington University in St. Louis in 1987 for a dissertation on the subject of "An Archaeological Ethnography of Blacksmiths, Potters and Masons in Jenné, Mali".

== Career ==
LaViolette is an archaeologist at the University of Virginia where she specialises in Swahili archaeology. She is the joint editor with Stephanie Wynne-Jones of The Swahili World (Routledge, 2018).

== Selected publications ==
=== 1990s ===
- 1990 - "Iron Age Settlement around Mkiu, South-eastern Tanzania". Azania 25:19-26. (With W. B. Fawcett).
- 1994 - "Masons of Mali: A Millennium of Design and Technology in Earthen Materials." In Society, Culture, and Technology in Africa. S. Terry Childs, ed. pp. 86–97. Philadelphia: MASCA Research Papers in Science and Archaeology.
- 1995 - "Women Craft Specialists in Jenne: The Manipulation of Mande Social Categories". In Status and Identity in West Africa: Nyamakalaw of Mande. D. C. Conrad and B. E. Frank, eds. Bloomington: Indiana University Press.
- 1999 - "Elusive Wattle and Daub: Finding the Hidden Majority in the Archaeology of the Swahili" Azania (34) 87–108. (With Jeffrey Fleisher)

=== 2000s ===
- 2000 - Ethno-archaeology in Jenné, Mali: Craft and Status among Smiths, Potters and Masons. Monographs in African Archaeology 49. British Archaeological Reports International Series. Oxford: Cambridge.
- 2002 - Encountering Archaeology in Tanzania: Education, Development, and Dialogue at the University of Dar es Salaam. Anthropological Quarterly 75 (2):355-374.
- 2004 - Swahili Archaeology and History on Pemba, Tanzania: A Critique and Case Study of the Use of Written and Oral Sources in Archaeology. In African Historical Archaeologies. A. M. Reid and P. J. Lane, eds. pp. 125–162. Kluwer Academic: Plenum Publishers.
- 2005 - Encountering Archaeology in Tanzania: Experience in Teaching at the University of Dar es Salaam. In Salvaging Tanzania's Cultural Heritage. B. B. B. Mapunda and P. Msemwa, eds. pp. 36–54. Dar es Salaam University Press.
- 2005 - The Archaeology of Sub-Saharan Urbanism: Cities and their Countrysides. In African Archaeology: A Critical Introduction. A. B. Stahl, ed. pp. 327–352. (With J. Fleisher). London: Blackwell.
- 2007 - Geographic Overviews, Africa, East: Swahili Coast. In Encyclopedia of Archaeology. D. M. Pearsall, ed. pp. 19–21. New York: Academic Press.
- 2007 - The Changing Power of Swahili Houses, Fourteenth to Nineteenth Centuries A.D. In The Durable House: House Society Models in Archaeology. Robin A. Beck Jr., ed. pp. 175–197. (With J. Fleisher). Center for Archaeological Investigations, Southern Illinois University.
- 2008 - 'Bead Grinders' and Early Swahili Household Economy: Analysis of an Assemblage from Tumbe, Pemba Island, Tanzania, 7th-10th Centuries AD. Journal of African Archaeology 6 (2):161-181. (With J. Flexner and J. Fleisher).
- 2008 - Swahili Cosmopolitanism in Africa and the Indian Ocean World, A.D. 600–1500. Archaeologies: Journal of the World Archaeological Congress 4 (1):24-49.
- 2009 - The Urban History of a Rural Place: Swahili Archaeology on Pemba Island, Tanzania, AD 700–1500. International Journal of African Historical Studies 42 (3):433-455. (With J. Fleisher).
- 2009 - The Archaeology of African History. Special Issue, International Journal of African Historical Studies 42 (3). (Ed. with Ann B. Stahl).

=== 2010s ===
- 2013 - The Early Swahili Trade Village of Tumbe, Pemba Island, Tanzania, AD 600–950. Antiquity 87 (338): 1151–1168.. (With J. Fleisher).
- 2013 - The Swahili World. Oxford Handbook of African Archaeology. Oxford University Press (Ch.62) 901-914 (Ed. P.Mitchell and P. Lane)
- 2013 - Swahili Historical Chronicles from an Archaeological Perspective: Bridging History and Archaeology, and Coast and Hinterland, in Southern Tanzania. In The Death of Prehistory. P. Schmidt and S. Mrozowski, eds. pp. 117–140 (With M. Pawlowicz). Oxford: Oxford University Press.
- 2015 - When Did the Swahili become Maritime? Jeffrey Fleisher, Paul Lane, Adria LaViolette, Annalisa Christie, Mark Horton, Edward Pollard, Erendira Quintana Morales, Thomas Vernet, and Stephanie Wynne-Jones. American Anthropologist 117(1): 100–115.
- 2018 - Craft and Industry. Adria LaViolette. In The Swahili World (S. Wynne-Jones and A. LaViolette, eds.) pp. 319–334. London: Routledge.
- 2018 - Pemba Island, c. 1000-1500 CE. Adria LaViolette. In The Swahili World (S. Wynne-Jones and A. LaViolette, eds.), pp. 231–238. London: Routledge.
- 2018 - The Swahili World. Adria LaViolette and Stephanie Wynne-Jones. In The Swahili World (S. Wynne-Jones and A. LaViolette, eds.), pp. 1–14. London: Routledge.
- 2018 - The Swahili World. Adria LaViolette and Stephanie Wynne-Jones. Routledge Worlds Series. London: Routledge.
- 2018 - Developments in Rural Life on the Eastern African Coast, a.d. 700–1500. Adria LaViolette and Jeffrey Fleisher. Journal of Field Archaeology 43(5): 380–398.

=== 2020s ===
- 2022 - Holocene human-ecodynamics and the littoral zones of the Zanzibar Archipelago. Adria LaViolette et al. Frontiers in Earth Science.
- 2023 - Assembling Islamic Practice in a Swahili Urban Landscape, 11th-16th Centuries. Adria LaViolette, Jeffery Fleisher, Mark Horton. J. of Social Archaeology 23(1): 99–124.
