= A'tris =

American indie rock band

ā'trĭs
- Origin: Boston, Massachusetts, USA
- Genres: Alternative rock College rock
- Years active: 2003–2017
- Labels: AirPlay Direct, Mark Records
- Members: Mason Taylor; Ben Azar; Nate Lueck; Travis Abel
- Past members: Michael Kreher; Dave Lewis; Zach McLean; Chris Ashworth; James Colazo; Pete Wahlers; Pete Koopmans; Pat Speece
- Website: www.atrishq.com

ā'trĭs /ˈeɪtrɪs/ was an American indie rock band formed in Boston, Massachusetts in 2003. The band currently consists of Mason Taylor (vocals, piano), Ben Azar (guitar), Nate Lueck (bass, background vocals, guitar), and Travis Abel (drums); while Michael Kreher and Chuck Sokol provide synthesized backdrops for live performances. In 2017, the band posted an extended play to SoundCloud, but their other social media accounts were deleted.

== History ==
The band was formed in 2003 by Mason Taylor and Michael Kreher, who were classmates at the Berklee College of Music. Other Berklee students were recruited to round out the band, including drummer Dave Lewis and guitarist Zach McLean. Another classmate, Chuck Sokol, was recruited to engineer the band's recordings. All of the band members later dropped out of Berklee.

After about two years, the band's lineup evolved to include Chris Ashworth (guitar), James Colazo (guitar), and Pete Wahlers (bass). This lineup recorded the debut ā'trĭs album Appeal, released in 2005. The album received positive reviews for its "cinematic" sound and similarities to R.E.M. and Radiohead. All members other than Taylor quit the band when faced the prospect of full-time touring, though Kreher remained involved as a producer alongside Sokol.

Pete Koopmans and Pat Speece were added to the band and contributed to the 2007 EP Of the Commons. Taylor recruited Azar, Lueck, and Abel for the band's second full-length album. That album, Lensing, was released in 2008. Reviewers compared the album to not just Radiohead, but also Jeff Buckley, Muse, and Coldplay.

In 2017, the band posted an extended play to SoundCloud titled Womb to War. Later that year, all social media accounts for the band except for the SoundCloud were deleted.
