= Adria Vasil =

Canadian journalist

Adria Vasil is a Canadian environmental journalist. She was the managing editor at Corporate Knights from 2019 to 2025, a sustainable economy magazine circulated with the Globe and Mail, Washington Post and Wall Street Journal. She was a lecturer at the Ryerson School of Journalism, from which she herself graduated in 2003. Beyond her post-graduate degree in magazine journalism from Ryerson, she has a degree in political science and cultural anthropology from the University of Toronto. She lives in Toronto.

== Writing ==
Vasil was named one of Canada’s Clean50 award honourees for 2026 in recognition of her leadership in sustainability journalism. She started writing NOW Magazine's Ecoholic column in 2004 and has published three books based on her column: Ecoholic (2007), Ecoholic Home (2009), and Ecoholic Body (2012).

=== Column ===
Vasil started at NOW Magazine as an intern in 2001 and freelanced for NOW until she became a staff news journalist in 2003. Her column, Ecoholic, started in 2004 after she began taking reader questions on the environment and green living.

=== Books ===
Ecoholic, Vasil's first book was published by Vintage Canada (an imprint of Random House) in 2007. David Suzuki said, "This book is for people who want to do something to lighten their impact on the planet. The small steps cost us little in the way of effort, money or time, but the cumulative effects can be enormous."

Ecoholic Home (Vintage Canada 2009) further explores how to live a greener life, this time focusing on our day-to-day home-life. Lindsay Borthwick, of Green Living Online says Ecoholic Home gives "informed, affordable and practical advice on how to green your home on any budget, going on to test the brands making the big green claims to help you make the right choice."

Ecoholic Body (Vintage Canada 2012) Vasil's newest in her Ecoholic series, is, according to The Globe and Mail "An eclectic guide to enviro-friendly body products – think shampoo, toothpaste, jewellery, dildos – Ecoholic Body is part Consumer Reports, part political manifesto." In Ecoholic Body, Vasil has created a list of the "Mean 15," 15 chemicals that we should be checking for and avoiding.
