= Atreya (surname) =

Atreya,Attreya (Devanagari: आत्रेय) or Aatreya is a Hindu Brahmin patronymic surname and gotra from the ancient sage Atreya, a descendant of Prajapati Atri.

== Notable people ==
Notable people with the surname includes

- Bhikhan Lal Atreya, Indian writer and scholar
- Rasana Atreya, Indian English language author
- Vishnu Raj Atreya, Nepalese writer known as Laato Sathi
