= Atrium Casino =

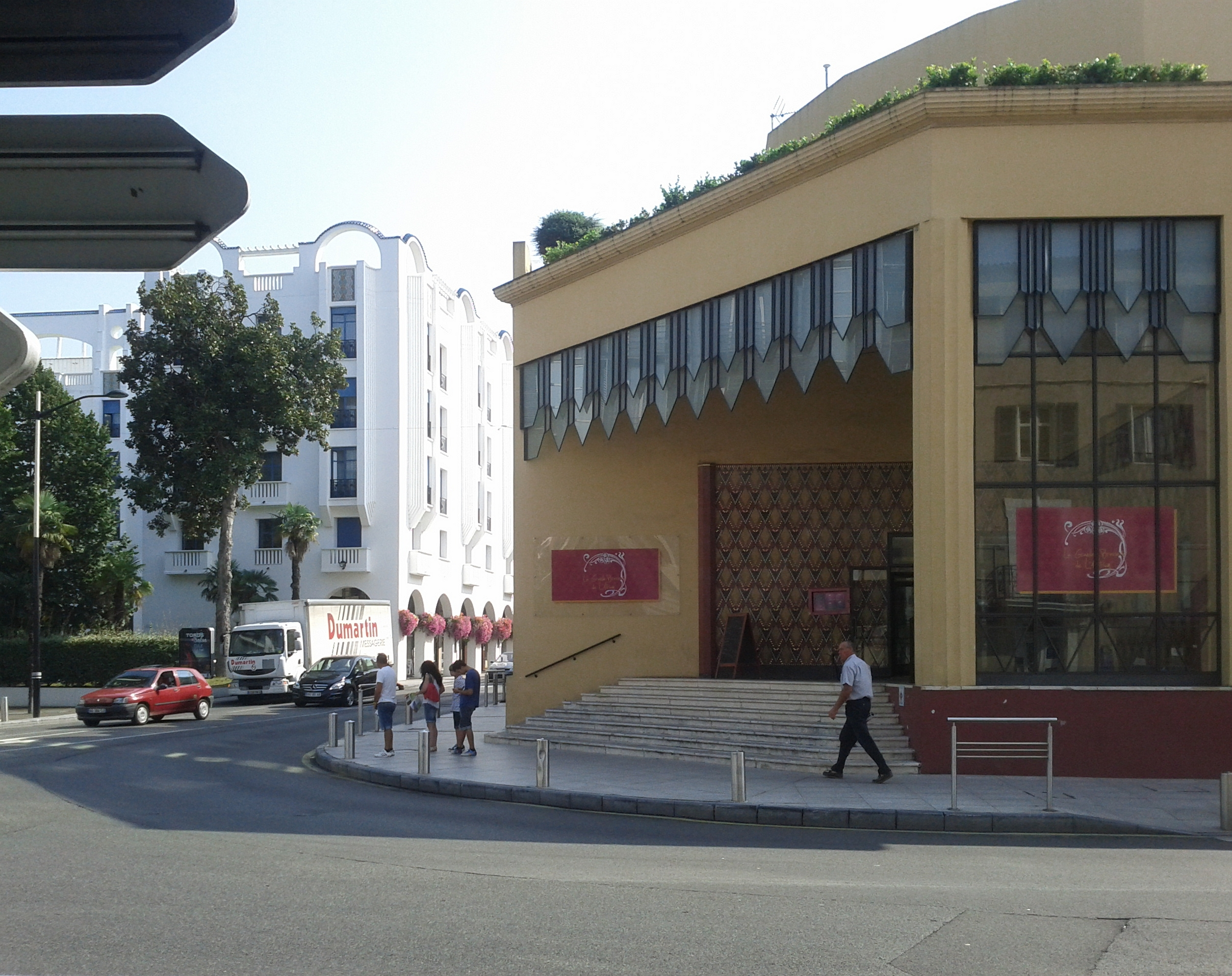
- Hôtel Splendid and Atrium Casino
- Interactive map of Atrium Casino
- Location: 1 cours du Maréchal-Foch, Dax, Landes, France; 43°42′39″N 1°03′21″E
- Opened: 1928
- Architect: André Granet; Roger-Henri Expert

Atrium Casino is the name of the casino at Dax in the south-west of France. It is listed under the relevant legislation as an historical building.

== Origins ==
In 1925 the local mayor, Eugène Milliès-Lacroix, proposed the construction of a casino in order to boost the appeal of the town's spa based tourist industry. The Paris architect André Granet, assisted by Roger-Henri Expert was mandated to implement the project. The sponsors and architects were keen that the new casino, built directly after the Salle Pleyel in Paris and shortly before the launch of the SS Normandie, should respect the still challenging Art Deco trends of the time.

== Opening ==
July 1928 saw the inauguration of first auditorium of this kind in the department when more the a thousand people attended a performance of Gounod's opera, Mireille. The building is constructed of reinforced concrete, and centred on an open-air amphitheatre, which is the basis for its name "Atrium". The bar is decorated with windows by Louis Barillet (1880 - 1948), then well known in France for his mastery of Stained glass.

== Degradation ==
The building is part of a larger development that also included the neighbouring Hôtel Splendid. It was acquired by the municipality in 1968. The passage of time proved that the reinforced concrete construction of the 1920s was ill-suited to the oceanic climate of France's western coast, and the casino's structural integrity deteriorated. A succession of half-hearted attempts at remediation failed to return the Atrium Casino to its earlier splendour and, sixty years after its inauguration, its poor condition led to its closure.

== Rehabilitation ==
A more sustained restoration exercise began with the large auditorium, now able to accommodate up to 800 spectators which gained a first historical building listing (subsequently rescinded) in 1986. The sumptuous décor of the ceiling, walls and around the proscenium, engraved on panels of gold and silver stucco, presents people and animals against a floral background. The theatre space has nevertheless been equipped with modern technological features, and is used for a range of shows through the year including dance, drama and concerts. The casino area, subsequently restored, received its historical building listing in 2000 and was reopened to the public in 2005.
