= Adria (motorcycle) =

The Adria company were better known for their motor vehicle and boat engines, but between 1912 and 1928 they built a range of 276cc, 282cc, 294cc and 346cc side-valve single-cylinder powered bikes.
