= ADR Institute of Alberta =

Canadian non-profit organization

The Alternative Dispute Resolution Institute of Alberta (ADRIA) is a non-profit organization with offices in Edmonton, Alberta, that provides Alternative Dispute Resolution (ADR) services to its members and the public. It was originally founded in 1982, encapsulated within the Alberta Arbitration and Mediation Society (AAMS), but the two organizations split in 2012 so that AAMS could continue to exist with charitable status, while ADRIA emerged and carried on the membership based non-profit work. ADRIA's mandate is to promote the use of ADR while offering education and training to individuals across Alberta and the Northwest Territories in negotiation, mediation, arbitration, and restorative practices. The organization has been used as a source for ADR information, resources and expertise in a range of both private and government matters. This now includes having a key role in the annual Conflict Resolution Day, hosted on the third Thursday of every October since 2007, which seeks to promote awareness for the utility of ADR practices. In 2013 ADRIA helped provide input for the review of the Condominium Property Act with regard to dispute resolution issues.

ADRIA is one of the seven regional affiliates of the ADR Institute of Canada (ADRIC), which presides as the institutions' national body, founded on August 1, 2000, following the consolidation of the Arbitration and Mediation Institute of Canada (AMIC) and the Canadian Foundation for Dispute Resolution (CFDR). The regional affiliates that have a Memorandum of Understanding (MOU) with ADRIC are:

- ADR Institute of Alberta (ADRIA), first signed MOU in 1996, originally as Alberta Arbitration and Mediation Society.
- ADR Institute of British Columbia (ADR BC), first signed MOU in 1996, originally as British Columbia Arbitration and Mediation Institute.
- ADR Institute of Ontario (ADRIO), first signed MOU in 1996, originally as Arbitration and Mediation Institute of Ontario Inc.
- ADR Institute of Saskatchewan (ADR SK), first signed MOU in 1996, originally as Arbitration and Mediation Institute of Saskatchewan Inc.
- ADR Atlantic Institute (ADRAI), first signed MOU in 1996, originally as Atlantic Provinces Arbitration and Mediation Institute.
- ADR Institute of Manitoba (ADRIM), signed MOU in 2013.
- Institut de médiation et d'arbitrage du Québec (IMAQ), first signed MOU in 2013.

In 2019 a new federation-wide MOU was signed between ADRIC and all its regional affiliates.

== ADR use in Alberta ==
While ADR generally receives less use in Canada than in the US, its application has been steadily increasing since the 1970s. Specifically in the Albertan context, from 1970 to 2000 a number of organizations related some form of ADR were founded, such as the Native Counselling Services of Alberta (NCSA) in 1970, the Alberta Arbitration and Mediation Society in 1982, Strathcona County Community Mediation Society (SCCM) in 1995, Foundation of Administrative Justice (FOAJ) in 1999, and many more. The creation of these can be observed as part of a greater trend across Canada which in the 1990s began to adopt a number of ADR programs as an alternative to litigation, particularly in regard to civil claims.

=== Community Mediation ===
Community mediation is an approach to alternative dispute resolution that is central to Alberta's ADR history. Organizations such as the Edmonton Community Mediation Society (ECM) and Calgary Community Mediation Society (CCM) were founded in the 1980s, and were some of the first adopters of ADR practices in Alberta, providing “conflict resolution for the community by the community." Community mediation practices are also present in certain faith based groups, such as the Mennonites and Ismaili communities. Indigenous peoples from a number of tribes also have traditions that strongly relate to the principles adopted in community mediation and restorative justice, and have been practicing these extensively in Alberta for generations.

=== Courts ===
Since the mid-1990s, the Judicial system in Alberta began to recognize the potential of ADR to alleviate the increasing strain on the courts caused by the public's expectation that trials and judges are the de facto approach dispute resolution. To address this, a few ADR programs were initiated with varying longevity to utilize the benefits of mediation and arbitration alongside court proceedings. In 1998 Alberta's Provincial Court began experimenting with mandatory mediation in civil claims through the Provincial Court Civil Mediation Program. Initially started as a pilot project in Edmonton and Calgary courts, the program still exists and has been expanded to several more regions across the province. This program involved the selection of particular cases that a court adjudication committee determined could be settled using mediation instead of going right to trial. In 2005, this program recorded a 63% settlement rate using interest based mediation.

Reforming the Family Justice System is an initiative that started in 2014 between a number of government and non-government actors. The initiative seeks to "improve awareness, coordination and availability of a wide range of services that support children and families, including information resources, legal resources, related health and social services, prevention assistance and resolution services." This effort was founded on the basis that family conflict, especially that which is managed through litigation, can lead to long lasting negative effects on the children exposed to it. As such, the initiative advocates for an increased awareness and use of mediation and educational resources to reform both the Family Justice System in Alberta and the culture surrounding family conflict.

As of September 1, 2019, the enforcement of mandatory alternative dispute resolution rules 8.4(3)(a) and 8.5(1)(a) will come into effect under a pilot project that aims to promote ADR use in the Court of Queens bench. The rules state that parties pursuing civil and family law actions “will participate in at least one of the dispute resolution processes described in R. 4.16(1) to be completed prior to trial.”

=== Government ===
One of the first major inquiries into the use of ADR by the Government of Alberta came in the mid-1990s, in particular through the Interaction '96 (I'96) conference held in Edmonton in 1996. With over 700 attendees from around the world, it is the largest ADR conference ever held in Canada. At its conclusion, individuals who had attended the meeting continued to dialogue among themselves, which led to the formation of the Dispute Resolution Network (DRN). The DRN was an informal collection of ADR focused initiatives and individuals within the Government of Alberta, acting as a center for the government's interest in ADR. This conference was essential in promoting the interdepartmental spirit that would allow ADR practices to be explored as a legitimate method to settling disputes.

In 1994 with the Municipal Government Act allowed local authorities the power “to govern municipalities in whatever way the Councils consider appropriate." Dispute resolution processes were added to the Act in 1995 and then again in 1999, which ensured that disputing municipalities pursued mediation before appealing to the Municipal Government Board for a binding decision. In 1998 AAMS, the foundation from which ADRIA would emerge, helped relevant stakeholders to create the Intermunicipal Dispute Resolution Initiative, which would come to provide the mediation services outlined in the 1999 Municipal Government Act amendment.

Encapsulating a range of alternative dispute resolution methods, ADR has become increasingly adopted by a number of government and private entities across Alberta over the last two decades. In 2011, Alberta's Police Act was changed to require that alternative dispute resolution processes "be offered in all appropriate situations, early in the police complaint process." Many of the mediators included in the roster for this initiative are trained practitioners with memberships to ADRIA and similar organizations.

=== Industry ===
For decades a number of companies in Alberta have relied on ADR practices to help resolve a variety of disputes. This is particularly prevalent in the organizations involved in the extraction of natural resources, in which land and trade disputes can be tied up in courts for years. In 1998–1999, the Alberta Energy and Utilities Board instituted ADR focused reforms in order to "[facilitate] the industry-landowner relationship and avoiding or minimizing conflicts." It aimed implement ADR mechanisms to help resolve landowner issues, through use of "company-sponsored consultations and negotiations, third-party mediation, company executive involvement, and EUB senior staff/Board Member assistance." In 2001, the Alberta Energy Regulator (AER) also codified the use of ADR in its guiding principles. Such practices not only provide a higher chance of quick dispute settlements, but are also considered a more effective way of maintaining relationships between disputing parties: a factor that is incredibly important when considering economic partnerships or agreements.
