= Greek ship Adrias =

At least three ships of the Hellenic Navy have borne the name Adrias :

- Greek destroyer Adrias (L67), a Hunt-class destroyer launched in 1942 as HMS Border but transferred to Greece and renamed before completion. She was returned to the Royal Navy in 1945.
- Greek destroyer Adrias (D06), a Hunt-class destroyer launched in 1942 as HMS Tanatside she was transferred to Greece in 1946 and renamed. She was scrapped in 1964.
- Greek frigate Adrias (F-459), an Elli-class frigate launched in 1977 as HNLMS Callenburgh she was transferred to Greece in 1994 and renamed.
