= Atri Kar =

Transgender rights activist

Atri Kar is the second transgender person in India to take part in a civil services exam after a long legal battle. The first transgender person to take up civil services exam is S. Swapna from Tamil Nadu.

== Early life ==
Kar lives in Hooghly's Tribeni with her family, comprising her parents, elder brother, his wife and son. She completed her graduation in English Honours from Calcutta University, following which she took admission in Bardhaman University for her post-graduate degree. She is a primary school teacher at Kuntighat. Kar is a student of elocution at Bratati Bandipadhyay's Institute and loves to read novels.

== Legal battle ==
Kar wanted to apply for the SSC TET examination, but noticed that they had only two options in the gender column. She first raised the issue with the Education department in 2011. She had just completed her Bachelor of Education (B.Ed.) and had applied for a job with the government. She had taken the School Service Commission examination and had qualified. At that point even the Supreme Court order had not been given. The Education department had told her that since she had given the examination as a female that's how she would be recruited.

Meanwhile, Kar had joined RICE to crack the WBCS (West Bengal Staff Selection) examination. Having trained there for one and a half years when she finally tried to fill up the form in 2016 for the examination, she found the gender column had only two options, either male or female.
