= G. V. Atri =

Indian singer (1964–2000)

G. Vijayakumar Atri
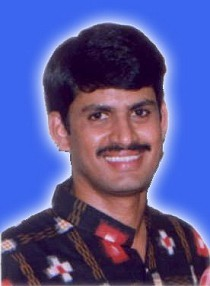
- Born: G. Vijayakumar Atri; 21 May 1964; Kanakapura, Bangalore district, Karnataka, India
- Died: 30 April 2000 (aged 35); Sringeri, Karnataka, India
- Occupation: Singer

G.V. Atri (born G. Vijayakumar Atri, 21 May 1964, died - 30 April 2000) was an Indian singer in the Kannada language.

== Early years ==
He was born in Kanakapura and raised in Bangalore city. He was trained in the Hindustani form of Indian classical music during his formative years under his guru, Sheshadri Gavai of Bangalore.

== Music career ==
Atri specialized in sugama sangeetha (light music), the modern singing form. He also sang as a playback singer for more than a dozen Kannada movies. He performed live on stage with avariety of songs. He was popularly known as "Junior P.B. Sreenivas", as his voice resembled that of the famous playback singer, P.B. Sreenivas. He composed and sang a few thousand songs encompassing a musical repertoire of romantic, devotional, patriotic, folk and children's songs for many of his albums.

He was a member of the Karnataka Sangeetha Nrithya Academy, a Karnataka government institution. He organized music oriented social events such as sugama sangeetha seminars, recognition tof historic musicians and music competitions.

He also organized a music workshop for the benefit of inmates of a Bangalore prison. He believed that music improves the qualities of human beings and it could reform even criminals.

He founded the Sangeetha Ganga, a foundation and music school to train and encourage young and upcoming singers in Kannada. Many have attended Sangeetha Ganga.

== Death ==
He died, along with five of his family members, during a bath in a river at Sringeri. Many awards have been instituted in his memory by public cultural organizations to discover and encourage young talents.
