= Adrià Pina =

Spanish painter

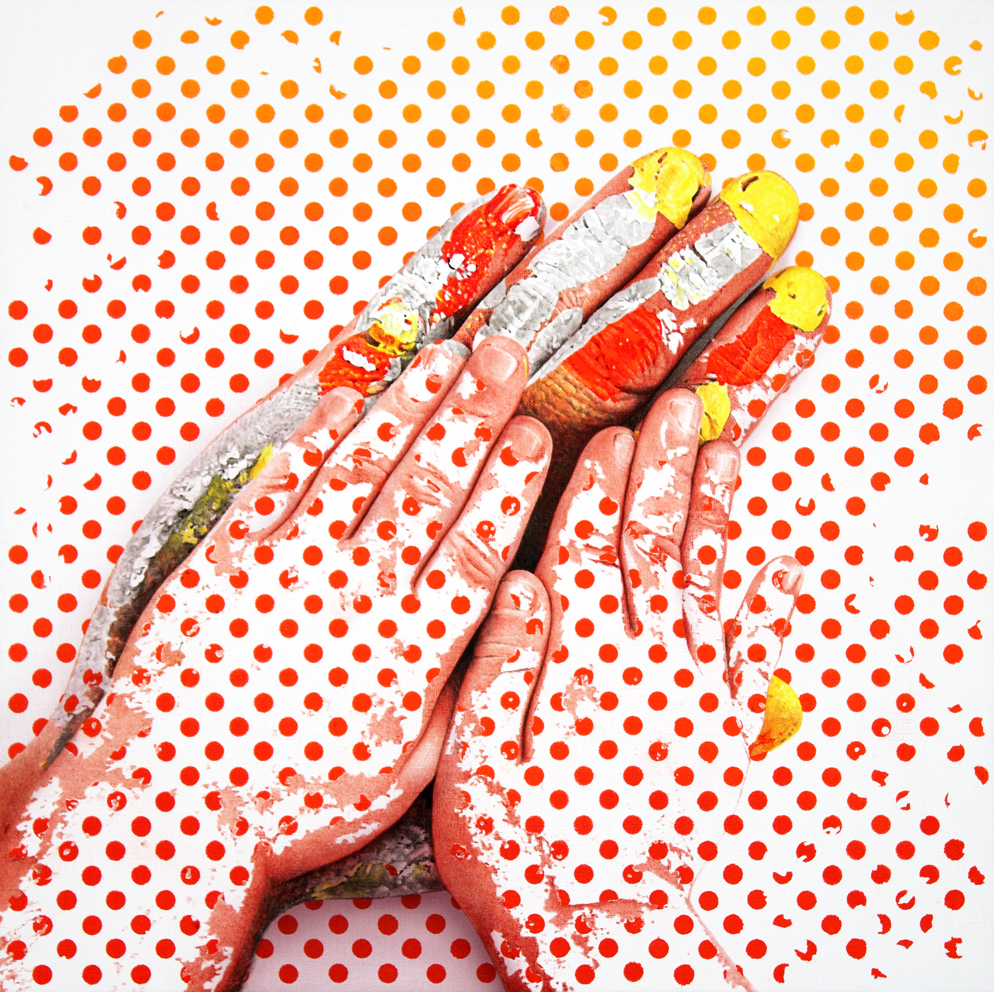
Mans, Mímesi 07 - Adrià Pina, 2017

Adrià Pina (born 1959) is a Spanish painter from L'Alcudia, Valencia. Among his honors Pina received the X BMW Spanish painting prize in 1995.

== Biography ==
Adrià Pina was born in L'Alcùdia on 5 March 1959. He is characterized by a photorealistic language. He has exhibited in New York City, London, Seoul, Barcelona and Madrid. In 1995 Pina received from Queen Sofía of Spain the Medal of Honor awarded to him as well as to another nine artists (including Fabio Hurtado, Elena Negueroles and Raúl Urrutikoetxea) at the 10th edition of the BMW painting prize award ceremony.

His work is characterized by a precise geometrical style with vibrant tones, through which he explores alternative perceptions of reality and has resulted in the creation of a distinct visual language.

Designing the artwork is for Pina not only a feedback process between concept and object, but it also takes into account the viewer, with the intention of capture its attention, and reaching both fun as profound concepts.
