= Adrià Puntí =

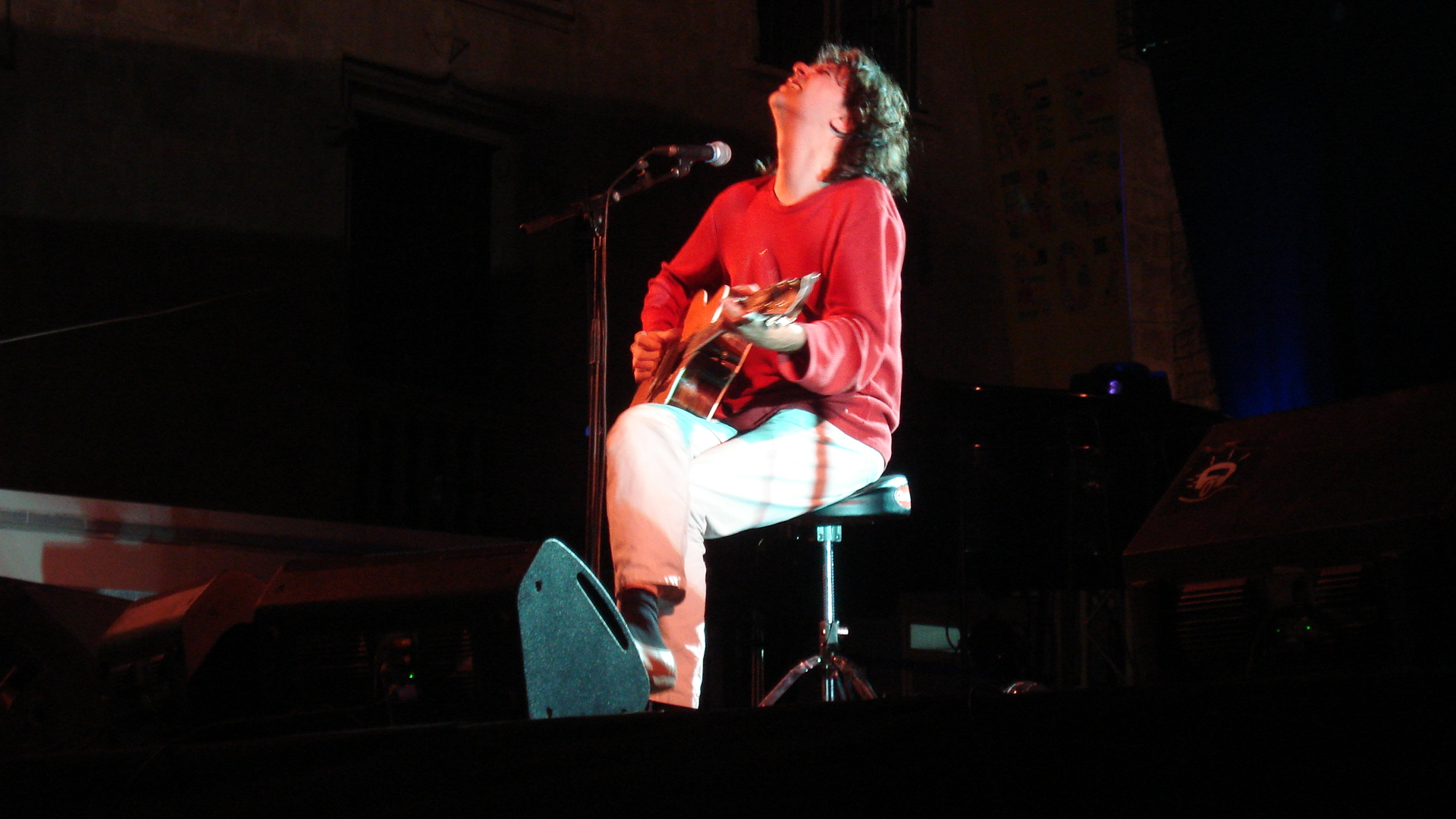
- Adrià Puntí

Background information
- Also known as: Adrià Puntí
- Born: Josep Puntí; 13 June 1963 (age 63); Salt, Catalonia (Spain)
- Genres: Folk rock, experimental rock
- Occupations: Musician, singer-songwriter, actor
- Instruments: Guitar, vocals, piano
- Years active: 1980–present
- Website: adriapunti.com

Adrià Puntí (Salt, Catalonia, born 13 June 1963) is a musician, singer-songwriter and actor. Currently he sings under his real name "Josep Puntí".

== Discography ==
With Umpah-pah:

- Tomahawk (1990) (Maqueta)
- Raons de Pes (1991)
- Bamboo Avenue (1992)
- Bordell (1994)
- Triquiñuelas al óleo (1994)
- La Columna de Simeón (1996)

As Adrià Puntí:

- Pepalallarga i... (1997). Picap
- L'hora del pati (1999). Picap
- Maria (2002). Picap
- La clau de girar el taller (2015). Satelitek
