= Adriatic (1811 ship) =

History

United States
- Name: Adriatic
- Builder: Isaac Daniel, Master Carpenter, Chester, Connecticut
- Launched: 1811
- Fate: Seized 1812

United Kingdom
- Name: Vittoria
- Namesake: Battle of Vitoria
- Acquired: 1813 as purchase of a prize
- Fate: Last listed 1833

General characteristics
- Tons burthen: 281, or 28143/94, or 282, or 283, or 286, or 28934/95 (bm)
- Length: 94 ft 9 in (28.9 m), or 87 ft 2 in (26.6 m)
- Beam: 26 ft 9 in (8.2 m)
- Propulsion: Sail
- Armament: 10 × 4-pounder guns

Adriatic was launched in 1811, at Chester, Connecticut, the first vessel built in the town. The British Royal Navy seized her in July 1812. She was sold in 1813, and her new owners named her Vittoria. She traded with the West Indies, the Mediterranean, and the Indian Ocean, the last sailing under a licence from the British East India Company. She was last listed in 1834.

== Adriatic ==
Adriatic was launched in 1811, on the Connecticut River. She was the first vessel built in the town.

On 12 July 1812, shortly after the outbreak of war with the United States, HMS Avenger detained the American ships Adriatic, Pochahontas, and Triton. (Note: Avenger's crew received a grant of 29/30 of the proceeds of the sale of all three vessels. A first-class share was worth £989 6s; a sixth-class share, that of an ordinary seaman, was worth £23 1s 4d. That amount was more than an ordinary seaman's wage for a year.)

== Vittoria ==
The Prize Court condemned Adriatic. On 16 June 1813, Southam & Co. purchased her and renamed her.

Vittorio first appeared in Lloyd's Register (LR) in 1813. In 1813, the EIC had lost its monopoly on the trade between India and Britain. British ships were then free to sail to India or the Indian Ocean under a licence from the EIC.

Year	Master	Owner	Trade	Source
1813	Southam	Captain & Co.	London—Isle de France (Mauritius)	LR

Vittoria, Southam, master, sailed from Portsmouth for the "South Seas" on 23 August 1813. In August 1813, prior to sailing for Île de France (Mauritius), Southam purchased a quantity of "Preserved Meats, Soups, and Milk". He used a little on the outbound leg, but more on the return leg. His letter to the manufacturers, dated 15 January 1815, in London, endorsed the products for their ability to retain the original flavours. (Note: Bryan Donkin and John Hall operated as Donkin, Hall, and Gamble, of Bermondsley. Theirs was the first cannery in Britain to use tinned iron containers.)

Vittoria next appeared in Lloyd's List's ship arrival and departure data as returning from Philadelphia on 3 April 1815. On 17 July 1816, Vittoria arrived at New York from Jamaica.

Year	Master	Owner	Trade
1815	Southam	Southam	London—"France" (probably Île de France, i.e., Mauritius.)
1820	Southam	Southam	London—Jamaica
1825	Southam	Southam	London—Genoa

On 23 August 1823, Vittoria, Southam, master, sailed for Bengal under a licence from the EIC. She arrived at Calcutta on 13 January 1824. The Asiatic Journal and Monthly Register for British India and Its Dependencies reported that Vittoria was the first vessel under 300 tons that had reached Calcutta and that had sailed "under the new Act". The Journal further remarked that her captain and crew numbered only 14 men.

On 14 April 1824, Vittoria, Southam, master, was among some 20 mercantile vessels that sailed from Madras for Rangoon to join the expedition against the Burmese.

In May 1825, Vittoria, J.H.Southam, master, had to put back into Calcutta to be docked. She had been on her way from Bengal to Rangoon when she had grounded in the Hooghly. By 23 June, she was at Penang.

On 3 June 1827, Vittoria, Southam, master, sailed for Batavia and Singapore.

Year	Master	Owner	Trade
1830	Southam	Southam	London—Genoa
1833	Southam	Southam	London—Calcutta

In 1830 and 1831, Vittoria, Southam, master, traded with Sydney, Hobart, Port Phillip, and New Zealand.

== Sources ==
- Anon. (1884). History of Middlesex County, Connecticut: With Biographical Sketches of Its Prominent Men. J. B. Beers & Company.
- Hackman, Rowan (2001). Ships of the East India Company. Gravesend, Kent: World Ship Society. ISBN 0-905617-96-7.
