= Threshold stone =

A threshold stone or sill stone (German: Schwellenstein) is a rectangularly dressed stone slab that forms part of the entrance of megalithic tombs of the Funnelbeaker culture, normally those with a passage. The red sandstone slab, up to 0.1 metres thick, was buried in the ground to a depth of 0.2 metres at the entrance to the chamber. Cultural sites of other types, such as Domus de Janas, also have a clear partition between the passage and the ante-chamber or main chamber.

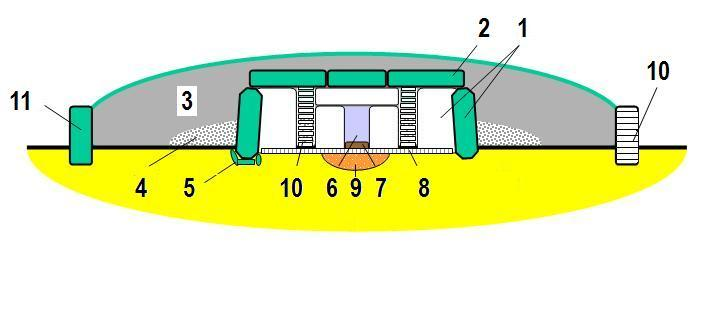
No. 7 = the threshold stone of a passage grave

Threshold stones are typical of dolmens, gallery graves and passage graves, etc. Whilst in most simple dolmens the blocking stone (Verschlussstein) of the entrance side was replaced by a threshold stone of varying height, the entrance to extended dolmens and great dolmens was narrowed axially or coaxially usually to about half the width of the chamber and the lower threshold stone marked the transition in the open doorway between the passage and the chamber. In simple dolmens with no passage and an entrance opening, the threshold reaches almost half the height of the chamber and protrudes 0.5 m above the hallway floor in Grave 9 in the northern part of the Everstorf Forest. Usually, however the upper edge of the threshold is not generally higher than 0.1 metres above the level of the hall floor in dolmens. The length of the threshold in polygonal dolmens and gallery and passage graves is also the width of the entrance which, in the Funnelbeaker culture, rarely exceeds 0.7 metres.

As well as separating the sacral chamber from the profane passage, the threshold stone also serves to support a door slab or sealing slab. If the passageway was used, e.g. in connexion with secondary burials, for cultic purposes, it was given a covering of flagstones and a second, outer threshold stone.

== See also ==
- Nordic megalith architecture

== Literature ==
- Ewald Schuldt: Die mecklenburgischen Megalithgräber. Deutscher Verlag der Wissenschaft, Berlin, 1972.
- Jürgen E. Walkowitz: Das Megalithsyndrom. Europäische Kultplätze der Steinzeit. Beier & Beran, Langenweißbach, 2003, ISBN 3-930036-70-3 (Beiträge zur Ur- und Frühgeschichte Mitteleuropas. 36).
