= Haga dolmen =

Coordinates: 58.1406°N 11.6119°E

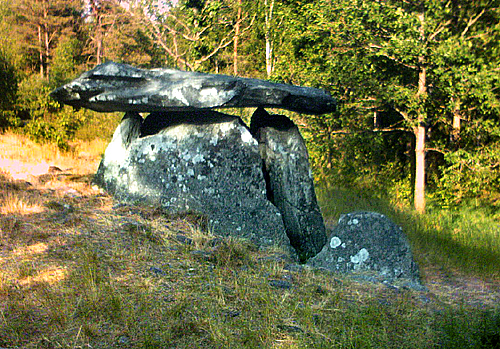
Hagadösen (2008)

The Haga dolmen (Swedish: Hagadösen) is a megalithic dolmen, dating from the Neolithic era. It is located on the island of Orust in Bohuslän, Västra Götaland County, Sweden. Hagadösen is registered by the Swedish National Heritage Board.

== History ==
The grave site consists of four raised stone slabs, with a fifth slab placed as a roof, with an additional threshold stone by the entry and a stepping stone. It is surrounded by a small mound of earth, and some barely visible edge stones. While small in size, the dolmen has the province's largest inside chamber. It has a rough dating of about 3400 BCE.

Several artifacts were found during an archaeological excavation in 1915 by Vilhelm Ferdinand Ekman (1823-1900). Among artifact were an amber necklace, a stone axe, a flint knife, and some slate jewellery. These finds were dated to the late Neolithic. No grave finds from the dolmen's primary period, the early Neolithic, have been discovered. The neighbouring dolmen was also excavated at this time.

== Other sources ==
- Gustafsson, Anders. "Hagadösen - alla dösars dös. En visuell biografi". Plats på scen. Kring beskrivning och förmedling av Bohusläns fasta fornlämningar genom tiderna. Gothenburg: Bohusläns museum. pp. 163–200.
