= Simple dolmen =

Early form of dolmen or megalithic tomb

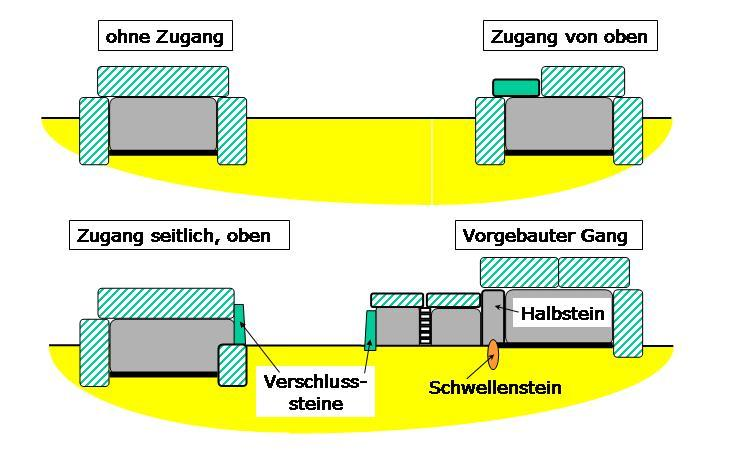
The development of the block cist (above left) into the simple dolmen with passage (below right)

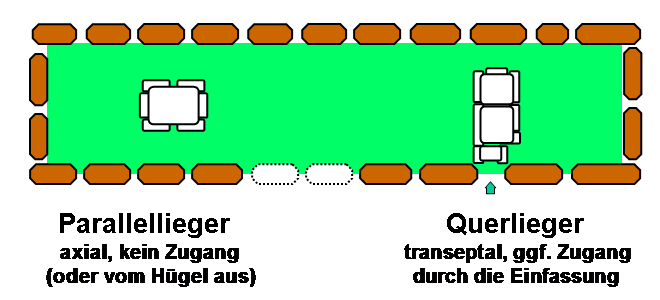
Parallel and transversely-oriented dolmens

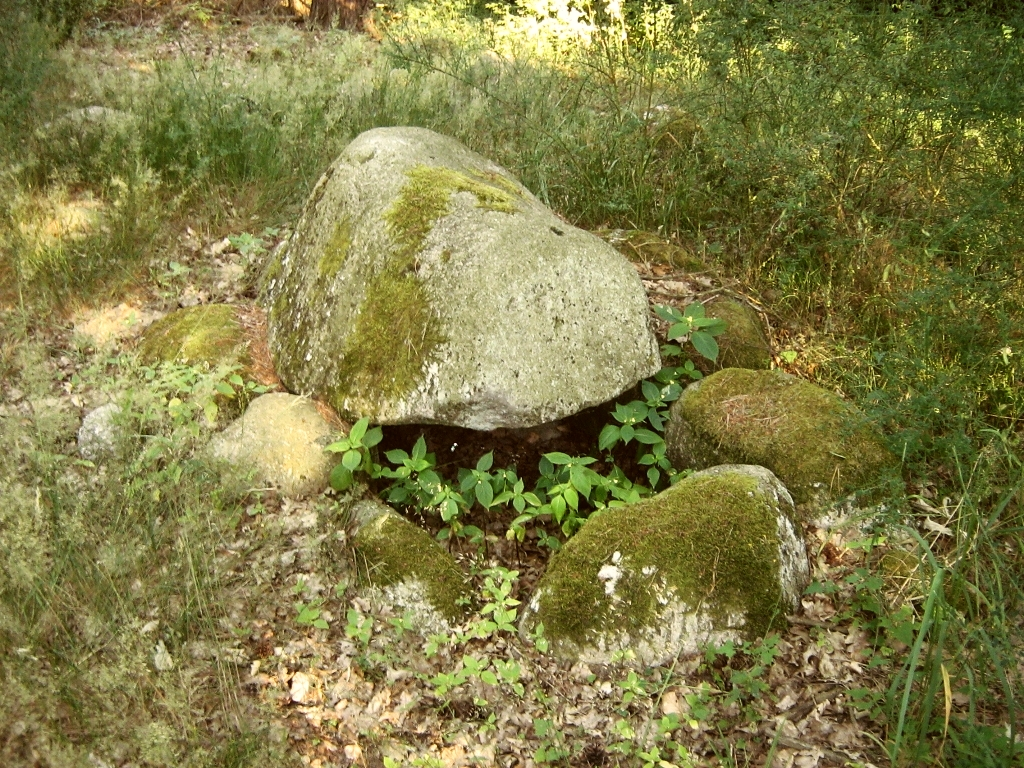
Simple dolmen in the Dammerstorf Forest (Mecklenburg-Vorpommern)

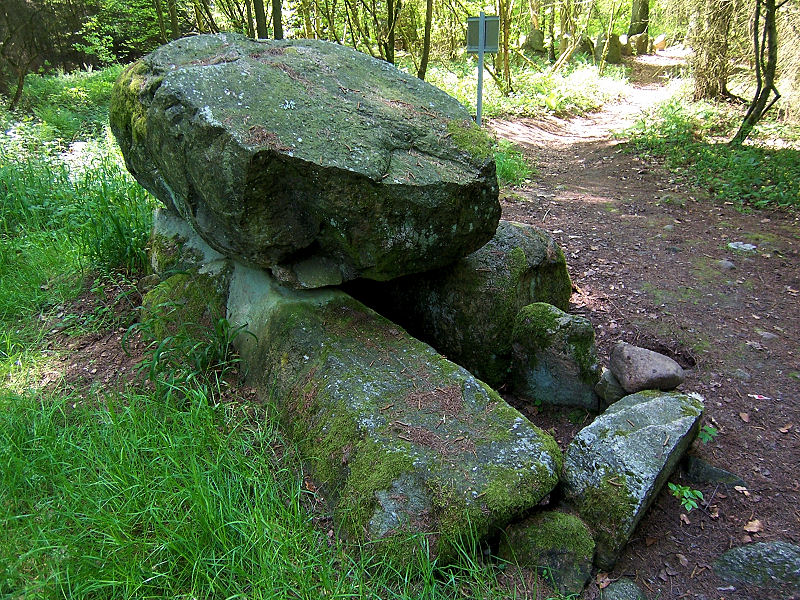
Simple dolmen near Grevesmühlen

The simple dolmen (German: Urdolmen, literally "ancient dolmen") or primeval dolmen is an early form of dolmen or megalithic tomb that occurs especially in Northern Europe. The term was defined by archaeologist, Ernst Sprockhoff, and utilised by Ewald Schuldt in publicising his excavation of 106 megalithic sites in the north German state of Mecklenburg-Vorpommern. The simple dolmen emerged in the early days of the development of megalithic monuments of the Funnelbeaker culture (TBK) and around 3,500 BC they appeared across almost the entire region covered by the stone cult structures of Nordic megalith architecture, but not in the Netherlands, in Lower Saxony west of the River Weser nor east of the River Oder and only once in Sweden (Lejeby Laholm).

Neolithic monuments are an expression of the culture and ideology of Neolithic communities. Their emergence and function serve as indicators of social development.

== Distinction between simple dolmens and stone cists ==
In many cases there is no clear distinction between simple dolmens and stone cists. In the necropolis of Brüssow-Wollschow, in the Uckermark region, simple dolmens and stone cists occur together. The differences consist in the degree to which they are embedded and in the material used for the sidestones (orthostats). In simple dolmens the sidestones consist of rubble, in stone cists of slabs. Whether this was of relevance for Neolithic people, remains questionable, because there are also combinations of both materials.

== Evolution ==
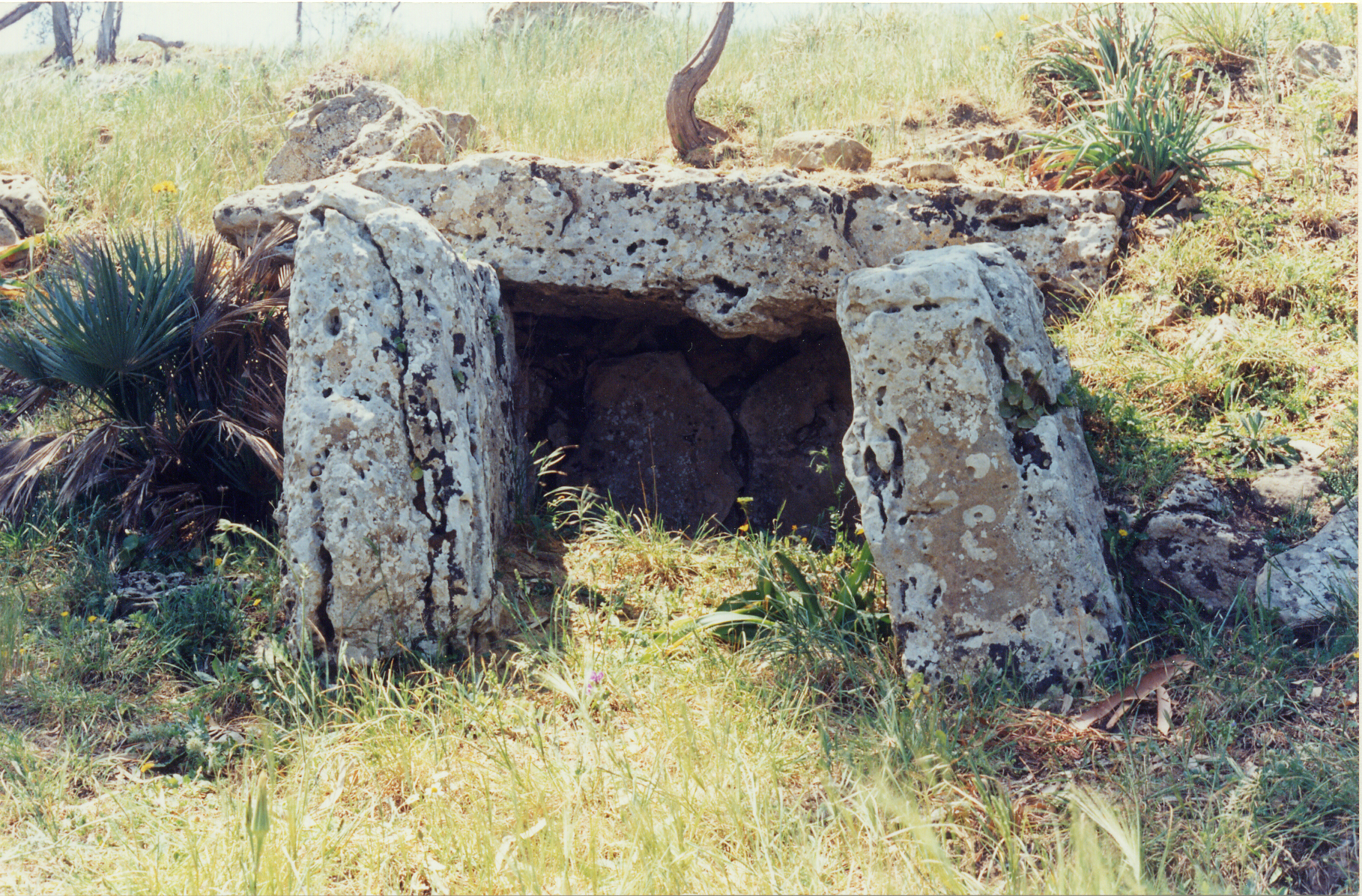
Monte Bubbonia dolmen, Sicily

The smallest simple dolmens occur on the Danish island of Zealand, where the ratio of length-to-breadth of the southern half of the island (Dolmen of Jyderup) (1.7 x 0.6 m) is even less in the north. This small size led researchers such as Hans-Jürgen Beier, to refuse to give simple dolmens the status of a megalithic site. Whether, however, the equally very small megalithic tombs fulfil his conditions, is still open to question. Also in Sicily, in recent years, are being found small dolmen monuments, because around the end of the 3rd millennium BC, the west coast of the Mediterranean island was caught up in a cultural wave (bringing the bell-shaped goblet) coming the Sardinian coast, which in turn had imported from the peninsula Iberica.

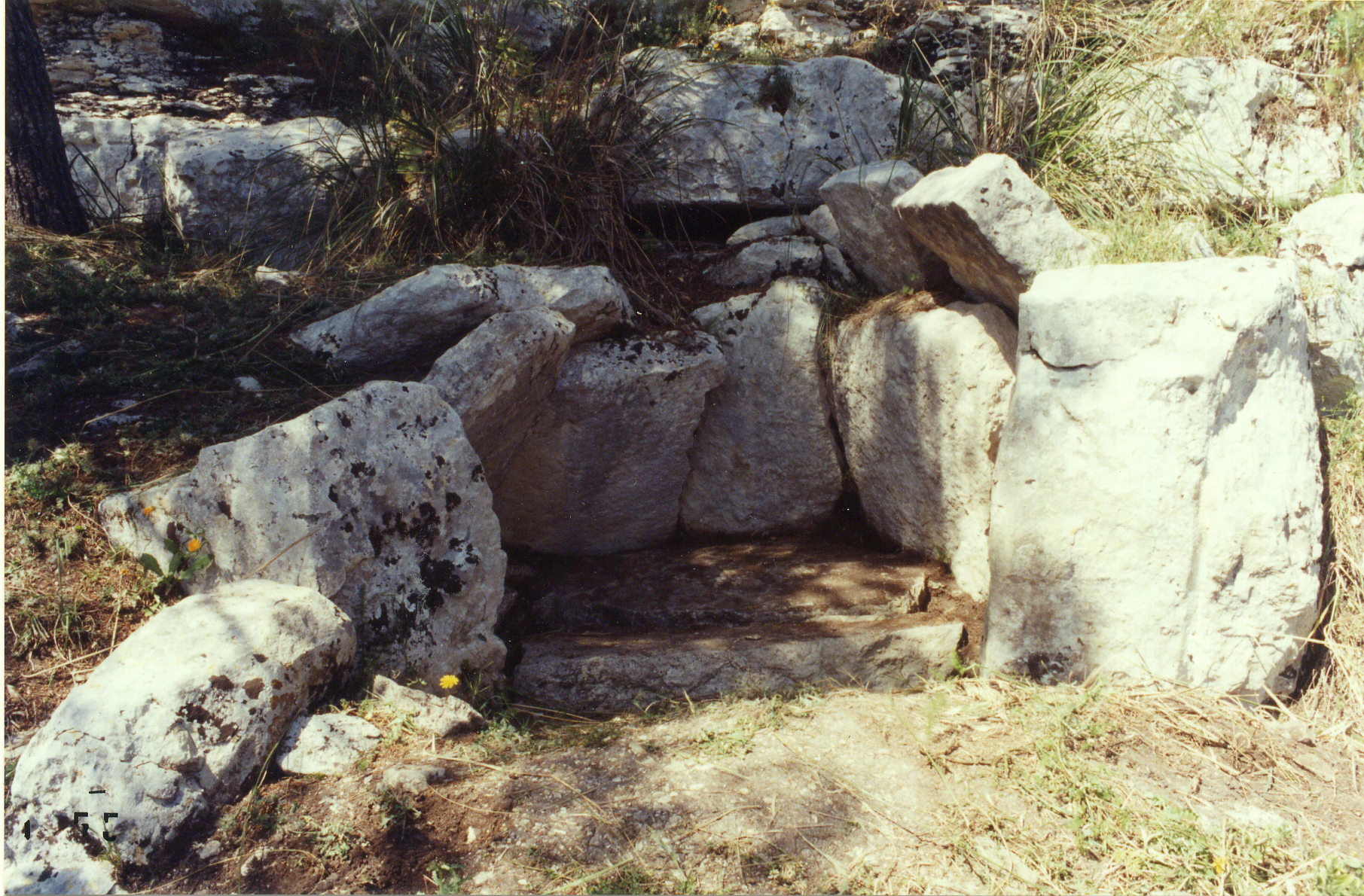
Cava dei Servi dolmen, Sicily

You can follow the evolution of simple dolmens, which for the early builders was a learning process, and how, step by step, they met the demands placed on them at the time by producing ever more mature (and larger) solutions. This also applies to the development of simple dolmens into extended dolmens (also called rectangular dolmens), to its round variant, the polygonal dolmen, and to the great dolmens.

== Block cists ==
The prototype of the simple dolmen is the so-called block cist, enclosed on all sides and dug into the ground. It has no entrance and is, once closed, difficult for the technically less skilled user to open and re-utilise. It was therefore only intended for a one-time use.

On the island of Sylt in Schleswig-Holstein, two simple dolmens were found in a common enclosure (Hünenbett). But there is usually only one simple dolmen within an enclosure, lying parallel to the longitudinal axis, the so-called parallel type (Parallellieger). In Ulstrup near Gundeslevholm two of the three simple dolmens form a pair next to one another in the enclosure. The block cist in the Tykskov of Varnæs near Aabenraa and the one in the Nørreskov on Alsen lie diagonally within the enclosure. North of the River Eider about 20% of the simple dolmens are covered by a circular mound.

== Access ==
Initial progress - in terms of multiple use - was achieved by the creation of an entrance. In examples that were still dug into the ground the entrance was (in Denmark and Mecklenburg-Western Pomerania) initially made through the roof - as, for example, at Barkvieren. By dividing the ceiling into a large stone and a stone that could be lifted by hand, access from above was enabled. This variant, however, is not very widespread.

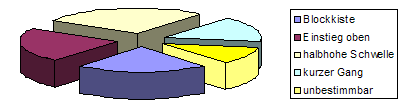
Breakdown of the 18 simple dolmens researched by Schuldt

This development path was abandoned in favour of options using other axes of entry. The simple dolmen was now buried less deeply and the upper half of one of the ends was used as access. This form can be found e.g. in the stone enclosures of Grundoldendorf. The weight of the single stone was still divided amongst three orthostats. This process shows the discovery of the stability of a three-point support system.

The always parallel-sided open simple dolmens are 2.2 to 2.6 metres long and 1.0 to 1.8 metres wide and slightly larger than the closed examples. For Schleswig-Holstein, the small chamber at Dobersdorf Plön county, (only 1.8 metres long x 0.5 metres wide) is, in this respect, an exception. Of the 20 simple dolmens in Schleswig-Holstein, 12 are sealed on all sides, five are classified as open at the end and the design of three (destroyed) simple dolmens cannot be determined. Of about 88 simple dolmens once found in Mecklenburg-Vorpommern there are still 51 survivors.

Subsequently, the first rectangular dolmens (Grammdorf in the municipality of Wangels) and passage graves (Deinste) were built, still sunk in pits. In the next step, the Neolithic builders understood how to lay the foundation of the three or more supporting stones (which in simple dolmens were always placed on their longest sides) in such a way that their base of the structure could be closer to the surface of the ground. This higher positioning allowed a passage to be added that led into the chamber at ground level (below right). Now, however, a threshold stone was required that separated the chamber and the profane or secular passage (symbolically) from one another.

The effort was made to reduce the size of the slab covering the opening of the re-usable simple dolmen to one that could be manhandled by the settlement community. The simple dolmen with a passage evolved into the "extended dolmens", which are generally longer, usually have more than one capstone and - apart from the transitional types at Neu Gaarz, Bad Doberan county - have orthostats that stand on one of their two smallest faces, thus allowing the roof of the chamber to be higher.

Simple dolmens once lay within stone enclosures or under circular mounds, but many of these have been removed. The simple dolmen at Lindeskov on Fyn lies within a 168-metre-long enclosure, the second longest in Denmark (after the Kardybdysse, 185 m). By comparison, the longest German enclosure measures 160 metres. In Poland, the length of one chamberless enclosure is 130 metres. In the Netherlands, researchers have only come across one site within an enclosure.

== See also ==
- Rock shelter – Shallow cave-like opening at the base of a bluff or cliff

== Literature ==
- Mamoun Fansa: Großsteingräber zwischen Weser und Ems. 3rd revised edition. Isensee, Oldenburg, 2000, ISBN 3-89598-741-7 (Archäologische Mitteilungen aus Nordwestdeutschland. Beiheft 33).
- Salvatore Piccolo: Ancient Stones. The Prehistoric Dolmens of Sicily. Brazen Head Publishing, Thornham (UK), 2013, ISBN 978-0-9565106-2-4.
- Michael Schmidt: Die alten Steine. Reisen zur Megalithkultur in Mitteleuropa. Hinstorff, Rostock, 1998, ISBN 3-356-00796-3.
- Jürgen E. Walkowitz: Das Megalithsyndrom. Europäische Kultplätze der Steinzeit. Beier & Beran, Langenweißbach, 2003, ISBN 3-930036-70-3 (Beiträge zur Ur- und Frühgeschichte Mitteleuropas. 36).
