= Troldkirken =

Archaeological site in Denmark

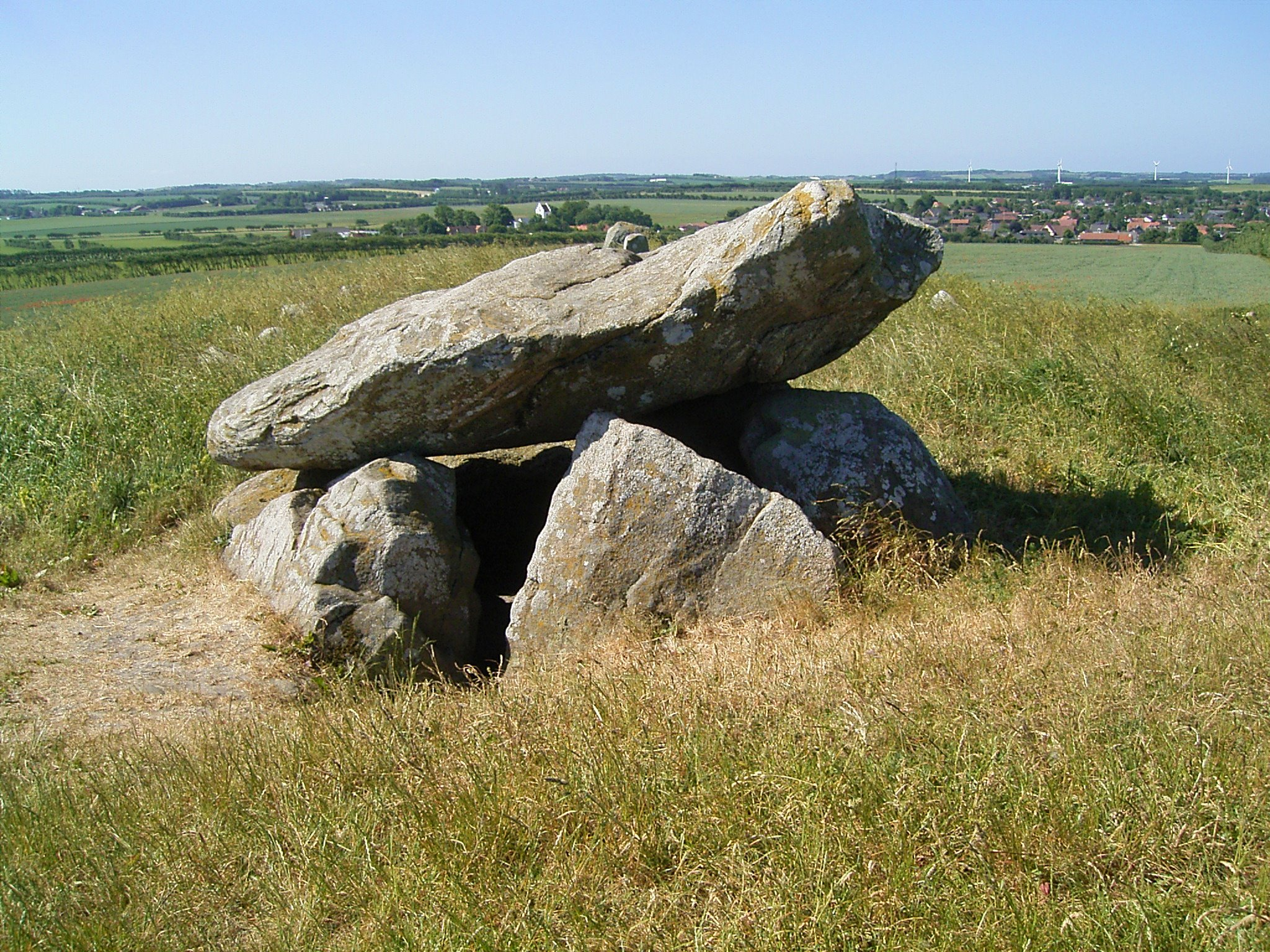
- The long barrow in 2008
- Interactive map of Troldkirken
- 57°0′29.87″N 9°45′3.25″E
- Type: Long barrow
- Location: Nibe, North Jutland, Denmark

History
- Built: c. 3500 BC

Site notes
- Material: Stone

Troldkirken is a Stone Age long barrow in the village of Nibe, Denmark.

== Description ==
The barrow was constructed by the Funnelbeaker culture around 3500 BC and is marked out by 47 megaliths. Placed on the top of the barrow is a polygonal chambered dolmen with a large capstone. The whole monument is some 50 metres (165 ft) long. There are several tumuli and dolmens in the area.

== History ==
The barrow has been a protected site since 1809, and was one of the first prehistoric relics to be protected by law in Denmark. Today the barrow is maintained by The Historical Museum of Northern Jutland in Aalborg.

== Name ==
The name "Troldkirken" means both Church of the Troll and Church of Sorcery in Danish.

There are several myths surrounding Troldkirken and its peculiar name. One of them states that it appeared when nearby trolls were angered by the noisy church bells in Sønderholm Church. They grabbed huge stones and threw them at the church, but missed. Another story says that a man once witnessed "the subterraneans" conduct a form of ceremony inside the dolmen.

== Sources and references ==
- Svend Aa. Reerslev: Sønderholm – Landsbyen med de to kirker, Aalborg Amtstidendes Trykkeri, 1961 (2. oplag 1975). (in Danish)
- Troldkirken Danish Agency for Culture (in Danish)
- Moth. "The Modern Antiquarian.com". Troldkirken (Langdysse): The Modern Antiquarian.com.
