= Rectangular dolmen =

Rectangular, enlarged or extended dolmen

A rectangular dolmen (German: Rechteckdolmen), extended dolmen (German: erweiteter Dolmen) or enlarged dolmen is a specific type of megalith, rectangular in shape, with upright sidestones and, usually, two capstones. The term rectangular dolmen was coined by Ekkehard Aner and is used especially in the German state of Schleswig-Holstein, where dolmens with this type of ground plan primarily occur. A more precise term, however, is extended dolmen, used by Ewald Schuldt and Ernst Sprockhoff, because these types of dolmen also occur with trapezoidal ground plans (e.g. the Gnewitz).

Neolithic monuments are an expression of the culture and ideology of Neolithic communities. Their emergence and function are a hallmark of social development.

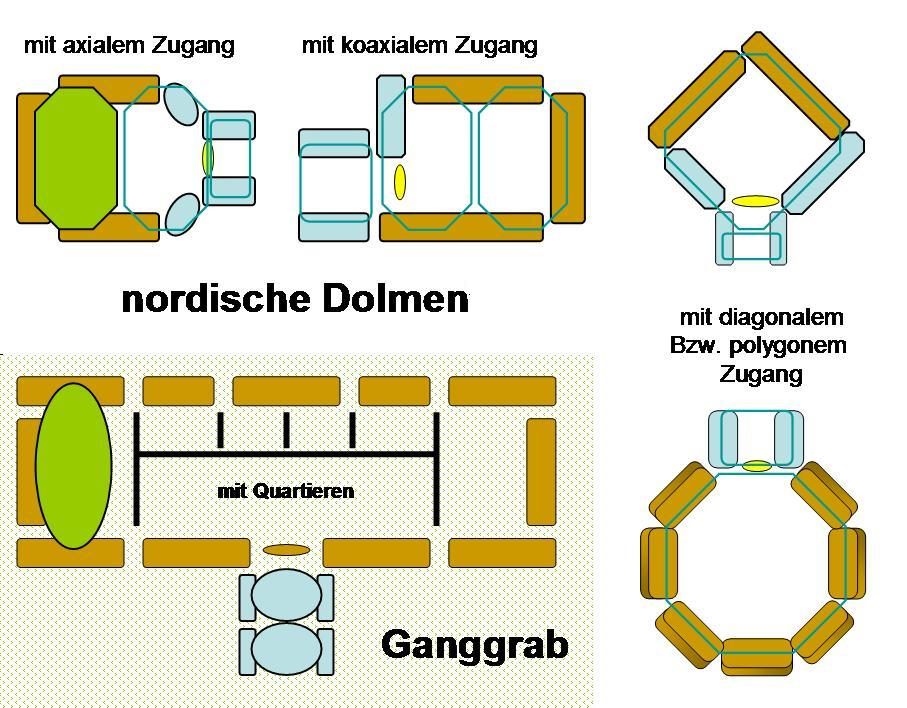
Rectangular dolmen (above), passage grave with sections and a polygonal dolmen (below)

== Capstones and passageway ==
Whilst the simple dolmen as a rule only had one capstone (but could have two), the rectangular dolmen, which differs primarily in the orientation of its support stones (standing) from the simple dolmen (lying), usually had two capstones (but also can have just one). Once a third capstone is added, it is called a great dolmen (Großdolmen) in Germany. A sub-grouping of this type of dolmen is based on the ever-present entranceway, which, for example, could be designed with a roof-height half stone or single-angle (einwinkelnd) support stones.

== Mounds ==
Within long mounds, rectangular dolmens are usually oriented at right angles to the axis of the enclosure. The proportion of rectangular dolmens in round (including oval) mounds, compared with simple dolmens, increases in Schleswig-Holstein from 20% to at least 27%. The proportion of mounds is probably higher, because experience has shown that circular mounds leave fewer traces than stone enclosures. In Mecklenburg-Vorpommern, however only two of the 20 "extended dolmens" surveyed by E. Schuldt were covered by round mounds.

== Entrances ==
Most types of dolmen that form part of the Nordic megalith architecture genre are open at one end (i.e. are accessible). Occasionally, a short passage is built in front of the chamber, often of just one or two pairs of stones of 1.0-1.5 metres in length. Even at undisturbed sites, it is often so short that it does not extend out as far as the stones of the enclosure or the stones around the mound, and just forms the ante-chamber to the main chamber. The place in the enclosure where one would have expected there to be a gap is closed, so that the stone in the row forming a side of the enclosure would have to be removed in order the get into the dolmen.

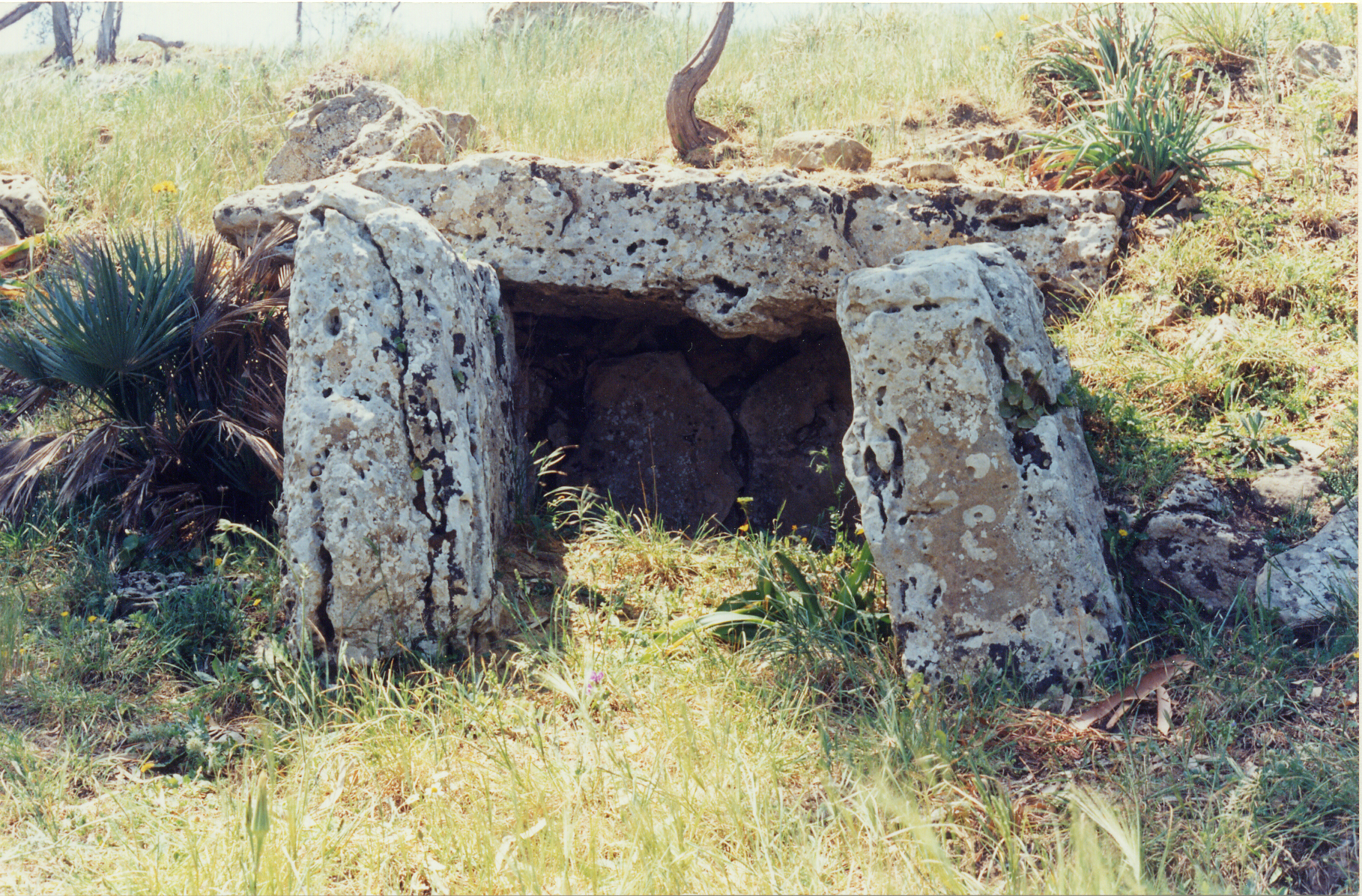
Monte Bubbonia dolmen, Sicily

In Denmark and Sweden, the passages could be much longer, especially in the round mounds that are much more common there. In Sicily, Monte Bubbonia dolmen is a chambered tomb 2.20 mt length, made of colossal splinters of rock, with no significant modifications, in rectangular shape.

== Distribution ==
Rectangular dolmens, which are generally over 2 metres, and sometimes over 3 metres, in length and 0.9 to 1.5 metres wide, continued the trend of increasing the size of the interior of the chamber, a tendency already seen in the development of simple dolmens. About 145 of these chambers occur in Schleswig-Holstein, where it the most common type of dolmen. It is also found throughout the entire coastal region and on the East Frisian Islands and its distribution reaches the Elbe south of Lake Plön, where it is also seen south of the river in Lower Saxony. In Mecklenburg-Western Pomerania, 54 extended dolmens have survived of an estimated 98 formerly.

Rectangular dolmens also occur in groups within stone enclosures. Whilst in Denmark up to five dolmens may be found in one enclosure (Stenbjerggård Barrow), in Germany the sites at Waabs in the district of Rendsburg-Eckernförde has three rectangular dolmens and the one at Kampen on Sylt has three polygonal dolmens in a single enclosure (both are in Schleswig-Holstein). A far greater number of enclosures, but also a few round mounds, have two dolmens or chambers.

== See also ==
- Nordic megalith architecture

== Literature ==
- Mamoun Fansa: Großsteingräber zwischen Weser und Ems. 3rd revised edition. Isensee, Oldenburg, 2000, ISBN 3-89598-741-7 (Archäologische Mitteilungen aus Nordwestdeutschland. Beiheft 33).
- Michael Schmidt: Die alten Steine. Reisen zur Megalithkultur in Mitteleuropa. Hinstorff, Rostock, 1998, ISBN 3-356-00796-3.
- Jürgen E. Walkowitz: Das Megalithsyndrom. Europäische Kultplätze der Steinzeit. Beier & Beran, Langenweißbach, 2003, ISBN 3-930036-70-3 (Beiträge zur Ur- und Frühgeschichte Mitteleuropas. 36).
