= Megalithic entrance =

Architectonic feature

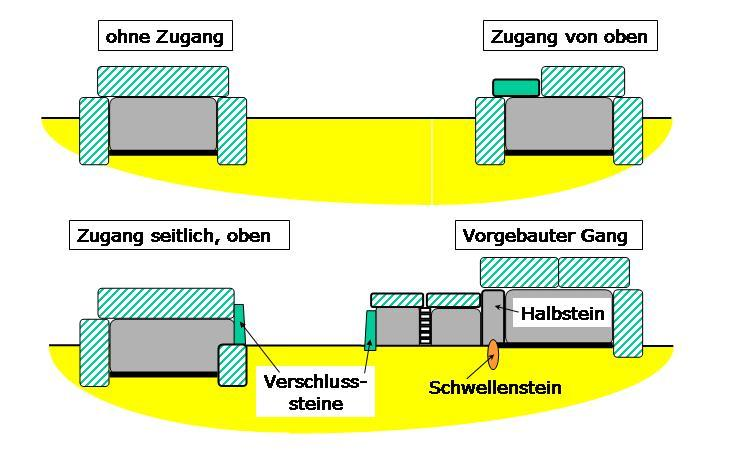
Entrances to simple dolmens

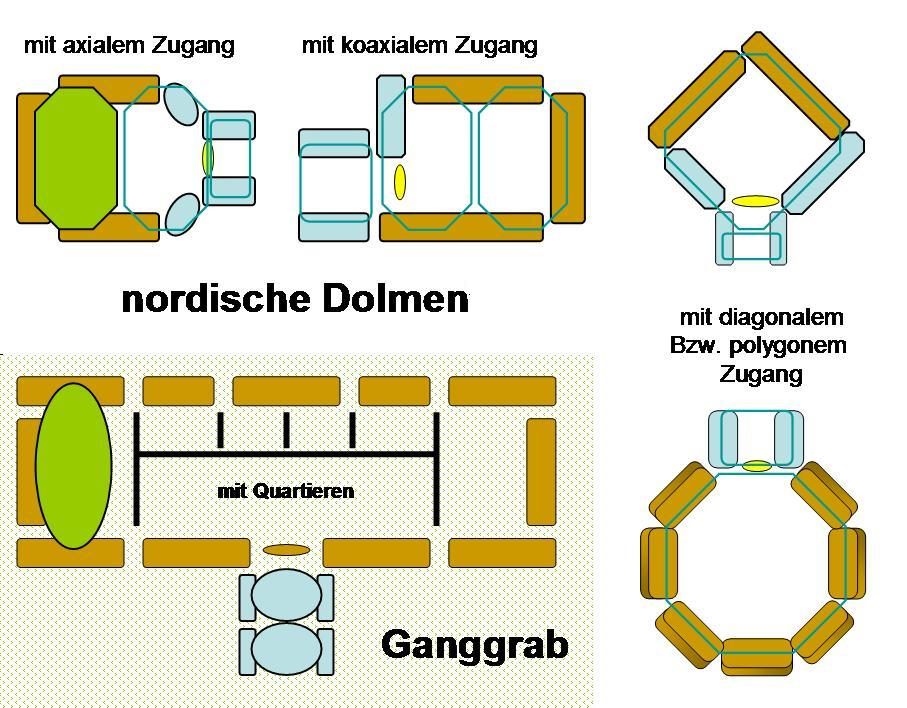
Dolmen entrances and passage grave plan

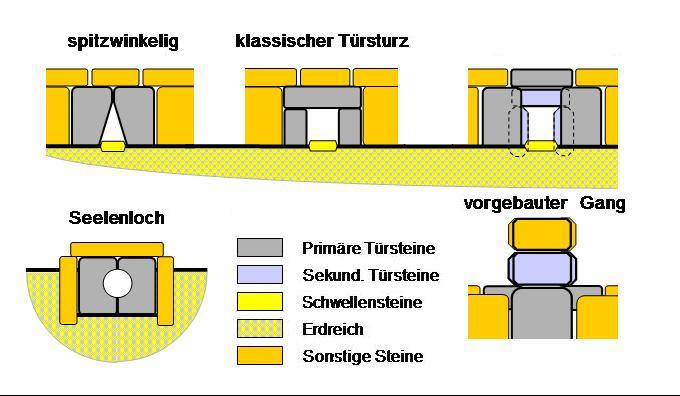
Passage grave entrances and port-hole

A megalithic entrance is an architectonic feature that enables access to a megalithic tomb or structure. The design of the entrance has to seal the access to the cultic structure in such a way that it is possible to gain access to the interior again, even after a long time, in order to perform rituals. To that end, the practitioners of Nordic megalith architecture, the Wartberg culture and Horgen culture, used several variants, that are also found in other megalithic regions in identical or slightly modified form.

As the solutions were refined in detail, they all had in common the aim of sealing the structure that its re-opening was possible under difficult but manageable conditions by the tribal community.

In general the following forms of entrance may be differentiated:

Simple dolmens (upper image)

- 1. no entrance
- 2. entrance on the top
- 3. half-height entrance sealed with a closure stone
- 4. full height half-width stone (with passage)

Dolmens (except No. 4)

- 5. squared entrance (eingewinkelter Zugang)
- 6. additional entrance to the external passage

Passage graves (lower image)

- 7. triangular entrance
- 8. portal entrance (with lintel)
- 9. low passage entrance in front of a portal

Gallery graves and stone cists

- 10. round (or similarly shaped) port-hole

Variation 7 has its focus in the Swedish Bohuslän (Dolmen of Haga). The stones forming the entrance were so selected or fashioned that together they form a triangular entrance (top left). This special form, which effectively replaces the lintel, is also found in the region of Languedoc-Roussillon, e.g. at the dolmen of Banelle, which lies near Saint-Hippolyte-du-Fort in the southern French department of Gard.

The portal entrance used a lintel, a horizontal block placed over two lower supporting stones in order to level out the distance to the capstone. This enabled access, usually only by crawling, through a trilithon opening (top centre), and may be seen across the whole area where Nordic megalithic architecture occurs.

In portal-like openings in the chamber wall, which, for example, have been made by leaving out a supporting stone, (bottom image: above right and below right), a passage in front of the chamber allows the cross-section of the entrance to be reduced. An example of this type of construction is the Sieben Steinhäuser in Lower Saxony. Such "chambers without (detected) passages" may be found in the Netherlands and Schleswig-Holstein. The entrance location and size determines, ultimately, whether the structure is a passage grave or a dolmen (J. Ross). In the Netherlands (Drenthe), where this form is very common, structures with no passages are known as portal graves; which otherwise, as portal tombs form a sub-group of megalithic tombs on the British Isles but structurally have nothing in common with the sites in the province of Drenthe.

Variation 7 is not dissimilar to the so-called port-hole (bottom left), in which the front stone or, as in the diagram, two front stones are hewn out so as to create a circular access hole. The slabs were made of a material that enabled contemporary methods and tools to be used to fashion them. This version occurs Central Europe at sites built by the Wartberg and Horgen cultures in Baden-Württemberg and Switzerland. Some Swedish so-called megalithic stone cists also have port-holes. In German, such a hole is known as a Seelenloch ("soul hole"), a name that originated because of the erroneous assumption that holes were created with the intention of releasing the soul of the deceased (in the minds of the builders). In the Bronze and Iron Age sites on Sardinia and the Iberian Peninsula, similar openings are found, that are also narrow, but nearer the ground, and apse-like, (recess-shaped) with embedded closure stones.

Another feature of ground-level entrances is a so-called stone sill (Schwellenstein). This separates the secular or profane area of the passage from the sacred burial chamber. In some cases, it also serves to support the closure stone or slab. In some embedded simple dolmens and portal tomb it is so high that it forms a half-height front stone, enabling access above it, and is thus part of the wall of the chamber.

== See also ==
- Nordic megalith architecture

== Literature ==
- Jürgen E. Walkowitz: Das Megalithsyndrom. Europäische Kultplätze der Steinzeit. Beier & Beran, Langenweißbach 2003, ISBN 3-930036-70-3 (Beiträge zur Ur- und Frühgeschichte Mitteleuropas. 36).
