= Polygonal dolmen =

Type of dolmen with five to nine supporting stones

A polygonal dolmen (German: Polygonaldolmen) is a megalithic architectural structure and often depicted as the archetypal dolmen. (Note: A detailed classification of dolmens into subtypes is only common in Germany. In the Netherlands and Poland these types do not occur. In Denmark and Sweden a distinction is only made between dolmens (Dysse, Döse) and passage graves. In Denmark the type of mound is used to distinguish dolmens in the nomenclature (Runddysse and Langdysse).)

== Description ==
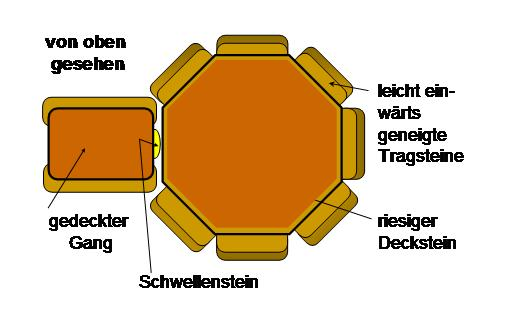
Diagram of a polygonal dolmen seen from above.

Five to nine supporting stones, or orthostats, shape the ground plan of the polygonal chamber. A single, sometimes especially large capstone covers them. An externally built entrance passage, whilst obligatory, has often not survived. In Dithmarschen the rectangular and polygonal dolmens of Albersdorf are particularly important. The Brutkamp is one of the most impressive examples of this type. Typologically viewed, the chamber of Hemmelmark, Rendsburg-Eckernförde, stands out, with its unusual dimensions of 2.8 × 2.25 metres and the division of sub-chambers by vertical slabs. Polygonal dolmen occur more rarely within stone enclosures (Schülldorf) and more frequently in round barrows (e.g. Dannewerk, Eckernförde, Haßmoor and Süderende).

Neolithic monuments are expressions of the culture and ideology of Neolithic communities. Their emergence and function are indicators of social development.

== Origin and distribution ==
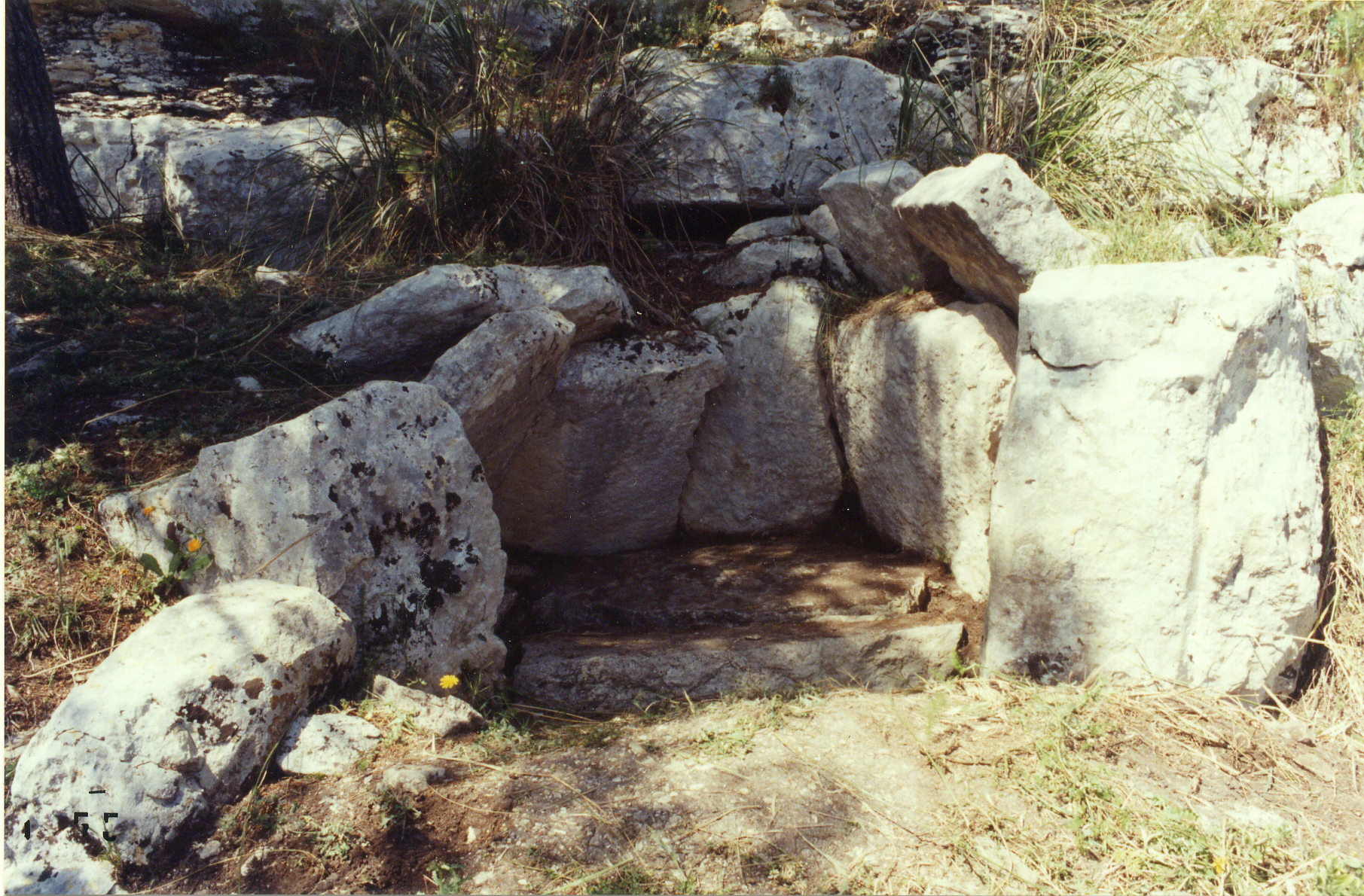
The Cava dei Servi dolmen, an example of polygonal dolmen in Sicily.

Originally it was thought (e.g. by Ekkehard Aner, Johannes Brondstedt) that this type of dolmen originated in the west, due to its approximately circular construction. These views were refuted by comprehensive research by Ewald Schuldt in Mecklenburg-Western Pomerania, which emphasized the autochthonous origin of different types.

It is encountered especially frequently in the north of the Danish island of Zealand, in the Swedish province of Bohuslän and on the Cimbrian Peninsula, for example, at Troldkirken in Jutland. In Schleswig-Holstein, there are 11 examples. In Lower Saxony, Mecklenburg-Western Pomerania and Saxony-Anhalt (Lüdelsen) they appear are only occasionally.

== See also ==
- Nordic megalith architecture
