= Dolmen =

Type of single-chamber megalithic tomb

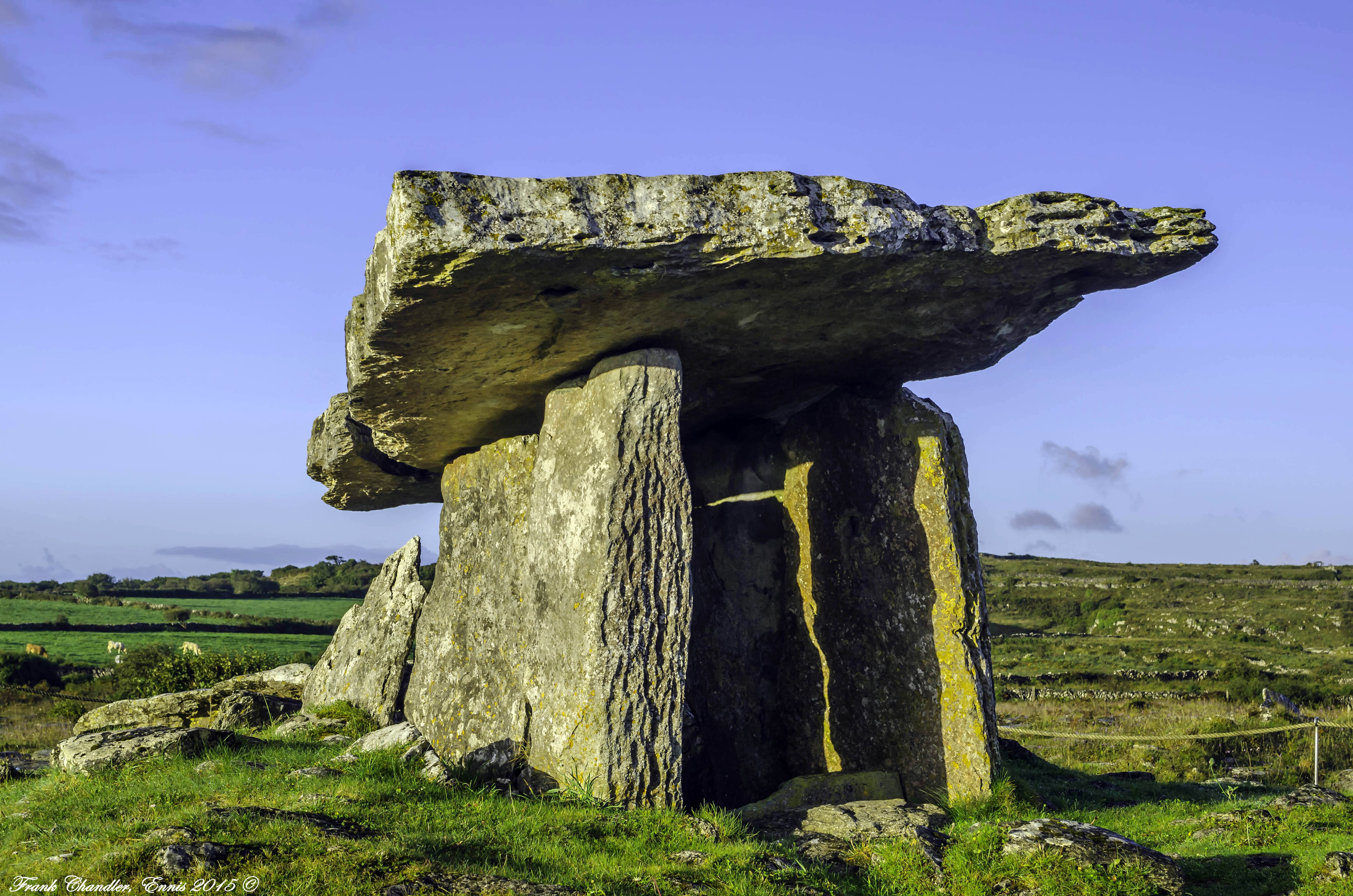
Poulnabrone dolmen, the Burren, County Clare, Ireland

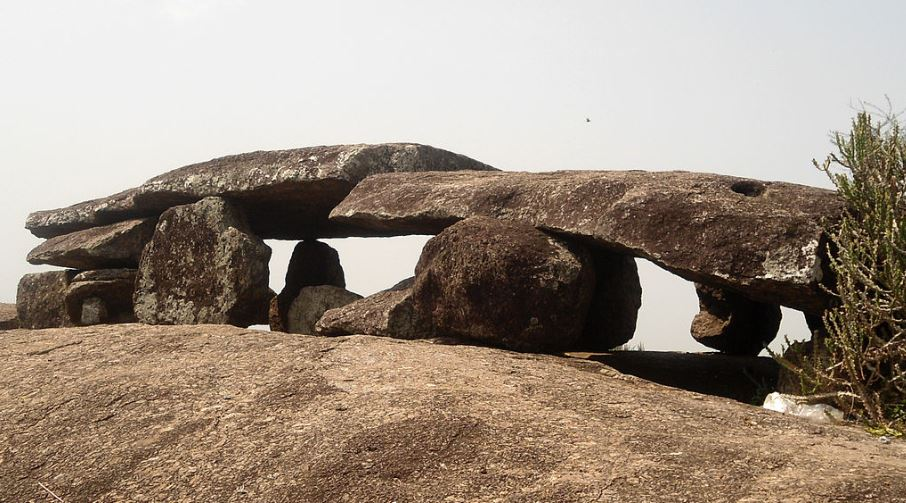
Dolmens in Amadalavalasa, Andhra Pradesh, India

A dolmen (/ˈdɒlmɛn/), or portal tomb, is a type of single-chamber megalithic tomb, usually consisting of two or more upright megaliths supporting a large flat horizontal capstone or "table". Most date from the Late Neolithic period (4000–3000 BCE) and were sometimes covered with earth or smaller stones to form a tumulus (burial mound). Small pad-stones may be wedged between the cap and supporting stones to achieve a level appearance. In many instances, the covering has eroded away, leaving only the stone "skeleton".

== Etymology ==
=== Celtic or French ===
The word dolmen entered archaeology when Théophile Corret de la Tour d'Auvergne used it to describe megalithic tombs in his Origines gauloises (1796) using the spelling dolmin (the current spelling was introduced about a decade later and had become standard in French by about 1885). Some sources indicate that dolmen is Breton, although the Oxford English Dictionary (OED) describes its origin as "Modern French" and argues that de la Tour d'Auvergne used the Cornish word for a cromlech, tolmên, but misspelled it as dolmin, and other sources refer to dolmen as a "continental term."

Whatever the origin, dolmen has replaced cromlech as the usual English term in archaeology, when the more technical and descriptive alternatives are not used. The later Cornish term was quoit – an English-language word for an object with a hole through the middle preserving the original Cornish language term of tolmen – the name of another dolmen-like monument is Mên-an-Tol 'stone with hole' (Standard Written Form: Men An Toll.)

In Irish, dolmens are called dolmain.

=== Other languages ===
Dolmens are known by a variety of names in other languages, including Galician and Portuguese: anta, Bulgarian: Долмени, romanized: Dolmeni, German: Hünengrab/Hünenbett, Afrikaans and Dutch: hunebed, Basque: trikuharri, Abkhaz: Adamra, Adyghe: Ispun

Danish and Norwegian: dysse, Swedish: dös, Korean: 고인돌; RR: goindol; lit. 'propped stone', and Hebrew: גַלעֵד. Granja is used in Portugal and Galicia. The forms anta and ganda also appear. In Catalan-speaking areas, they are known simply as dolmen, but also by a variety of folk names, including cova ('cave'), caixa ('crate' or 'coffin'), taula ('table'), arca ('chest'), cabana ('hut'), barraca ('hut'), llosa ('slab'), llosa de jaça ('pallet slab'), roca ('rock') or pedra ('stone'), usually combined with a second part such as de l'alarb ('of the Arab'), del/de moro/s ('of the Moor/s'), del lladre ('of the thief'), del dimoni ('of the devil'), d'en Rotllà/Rotllan/Rotlan/Roldan ('of Roland'). In the Basque Country, they are attributed to the jentilak, a race of giants.

The etymology of the German: Hünenbett, Hünengrab and Dutch: hunebed – with Hüne/hune meaning 'giant' – all evoke the image of giants buried (bett/bed/grab = 'bed/grave') there. Of other Celtic languages, Welsh cromlech was borrowed into English and quoit is commonly used in English in Cornwall.

== Western Europe ==
The oldest dolmens found in Western Europe are roughly 7,000 years old. Although archaeological evidence is unclear regarding their creators, the structures are often associated with tombs or burial chambers. Human remains, sometimes accompanied by artefacts, have been found in proximity of dolmen sites. While the remains can be analyzed with radiocarbon dating, it is difficult to confirm whether said remains coincide with the date the stones were originally set in place.

Early in the 20th century, before the advent of scientific dating, Harold Peake proposed that the dolmens of western Europe were evidence of cultural diffusion from the eastern Mediterranean. This "prospector theory" surmised that Aegean-origin prospectors had moved westward in search of metal ores, starting before 2200 BCE, and had carried with them the concept of megalithic architecture.

== Middle East ==
Dolmens can be found in the Levant, some along the Jordan Rift Valley (Upper Galilee in Israel, Palestine, the Golan Heights, Jordan, Lebanon, Syria, and southeast Turkey.

Dolmens in the Levant belong to a different, unrelated tradition to that of Europe, although they are often treated "as part of a trans-regional phenomenon that spanned the Taurus Mountains to the Arabian Peninsula." In the Levant, they are of Early Bronze rather than Late Neolithic age. They are mostly found along the Jordan Rift Valley's eastern escarpment, and in the hills of the Galilee, in clusters near Early Bronze I proto-urban settlements (3700–3000 BCE), additionally restricted by geology to areas allowing the quarrying of slabs of megalithic size. In the Levant, geological constraints led to a local burial tradition with a variety of tomb forms, dolmens being one of them.

== Korea ==
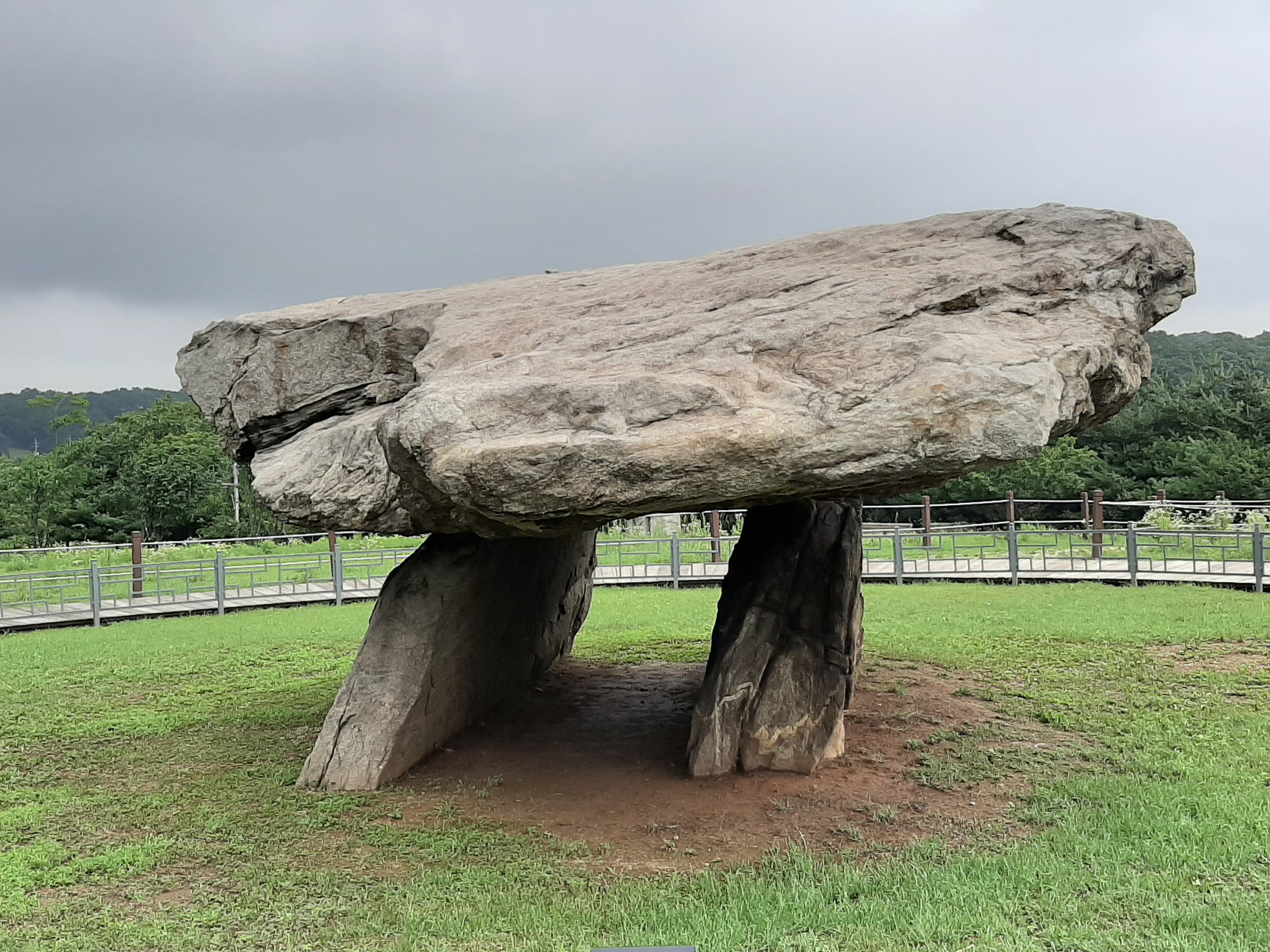
Dolmen at Ganghwa Island, South Korea

Dolmens (go-in-dol in Korean) were built in Korea from the Bronze Age to the early Iron Age, with about 40,000 to be found throughout the peninsula. In 2000 the dolmen groups of Jukrim-ri and Dosan-ri in Gochang, Hyosan-ri and Daesin-ri in Hwasun, and Bujeong-ri, Samgeori and Osang-ri in Ganghwa gained World Cultural Heritage status. (See Gochang, Hwasun and Ganghwa Dolmen Sites.)

The tens of thousands of dolmens on the Korean Peninsula account for approximately 40% of the world's total; the Gochang, Hwasun, and Ganghwa dolmen sites possess over 1,000 dolmens and feature the highest concentrations of dolmens anywhere in the world.

These are mainly distributed along the West Sea coastal area and on large rivers from the Liaoning region of China (the Liaodong Peninsula) to Jeollanam-do. In North Korea, they are concentrated around the Taedong and Jaeryeong Rivers. In South Korea, they are found in dense concentrations in river basins, such as the Han and Nakdong Rivers, and in the west coast area (Boryeong in South Chungcheong Province, Buan in North Jeolla Province, and Jeollanam-do. They are mainly found on sedimentary plains, where they are grouped in rows parallel to the direction of the river or stream. Those found in hilly areas are grouped in the direction of the hill.

== India ==
=== Marayoor, Kerala ===
Also called muniyaras, these dolmens belong to the Iron Age. These dolmenoids were burial chambers made of four stones placed on edge and covered by a fifth stone called the cap stone. Some of these Dolmenoids contain several burial chambers, while others have a quadrangle scooped out in laterite and lined on the sides with granite slabs. These are also covered with cap stones. Dozens of dolmens around the area of old Siva temple (Thenkasinathan Temple) at Kovilkadavu on the banks of the River Pambar and also around the area called Pius nagar, and rock paintings on the south-western slope of the plateau overlooking the river have attracted visitors.

Apart from the dolmens from the Stone Age, several dolmens from the Iron Age exist in this region, particularly on the left side of the Pambar River, as evidenced by the use of neatly dressed granite slabs for the dolmens. At least one of these dolmens features a perfectly circular hole with a diameter of 28 cm inside the underground chamber. This region contains various types of dolmens. A large number of them are above ground, with heights ranging from 70 to 90 cm. Another type has a height of 140 to 170 cm. There is also an above-ground dolmen with a double length of up to 350 cm. Fragments of burial urns can be found in the area near the dolmens, indicating that the dolmens with heights of 70 to 90 cm were used for the burial of individuals of high social status, while burial urns were used for the remains of commoners. The dolmens with raised roofs may have served as habitation for people. However, the reasons why some individuals lived in cemeteries have not been satisfactorily explained.

== Indonesia ==
In Sumba (Indonesia), dolmens are still commonly built (about 100 dolmens each year) for collective graves according to lineage. The traditional village of Wainyapu has some 1,400 dolmens.

== Types ==
- Great dolmen – Type of dolmen in Nordic megalith architecture
- Inuksuk – Inuit built stone landmark or cairn
- Polygonal dolmen – Type of dolmen with five to nine supporting stones
- Rectangular dolmen – Rectangular, enlarged or extended dolmen
- Simple dolmen – Early form of dolmen or megalithic tomb
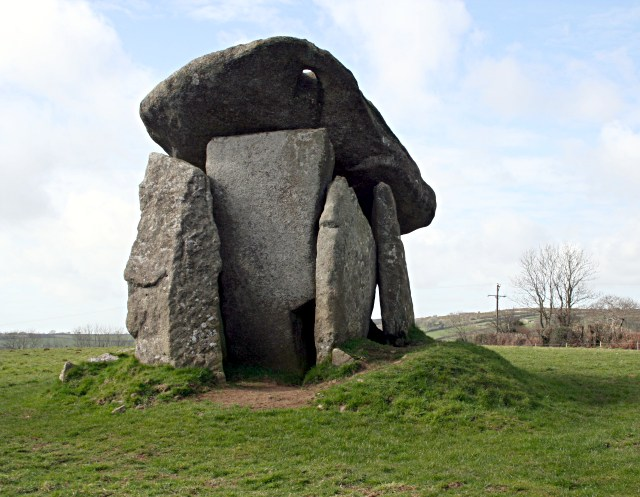
Trethevy Quoit – one of the best-preserved in Cornwall, UK dated to around 3500–2500 BCE

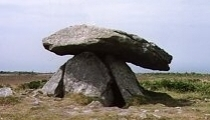
Chûn Quoit in Cornwall, UK, about 2400 BCE

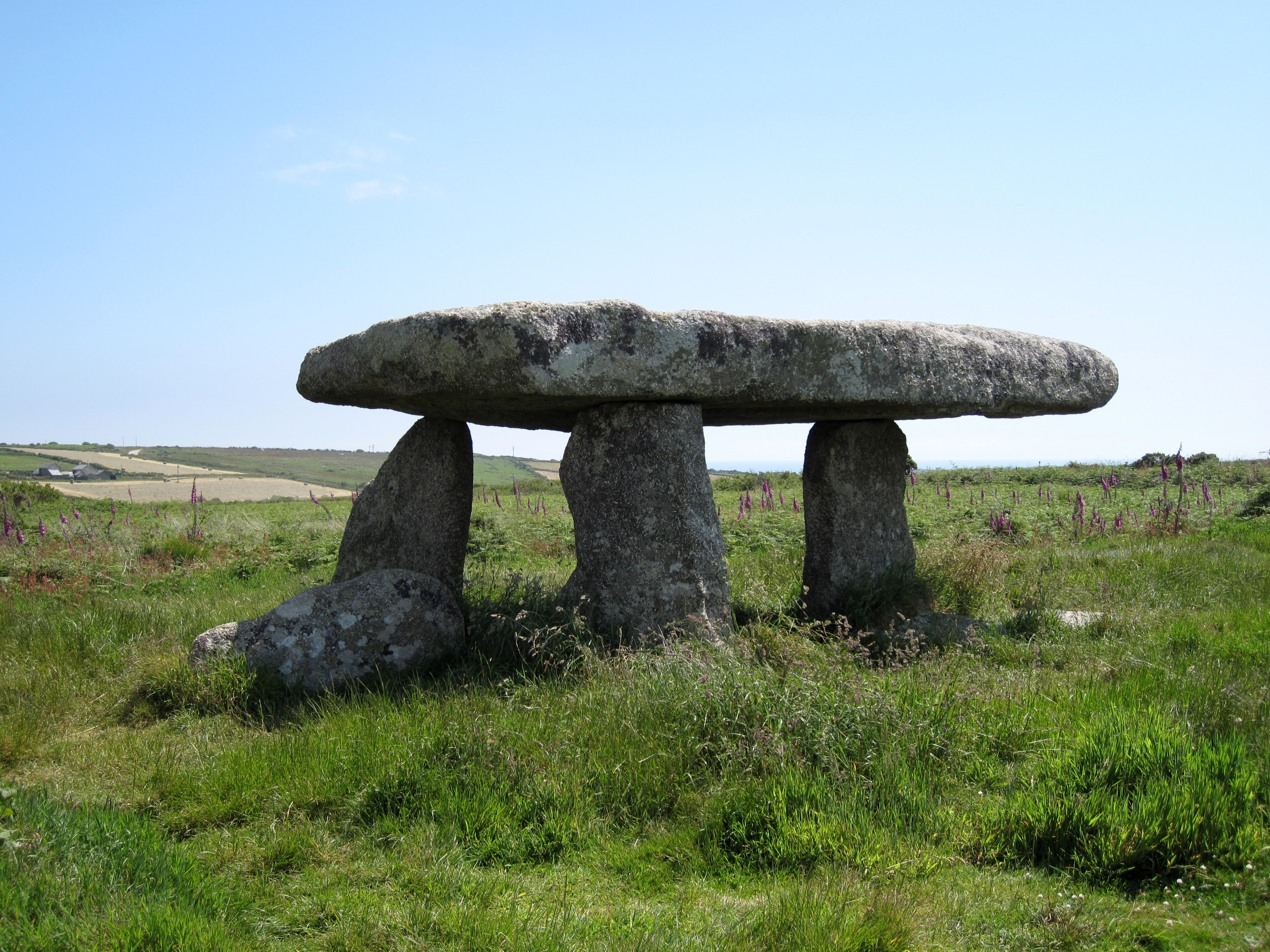
Lanyon Quoit in Cornwall, UK, 3500–2500 BCE

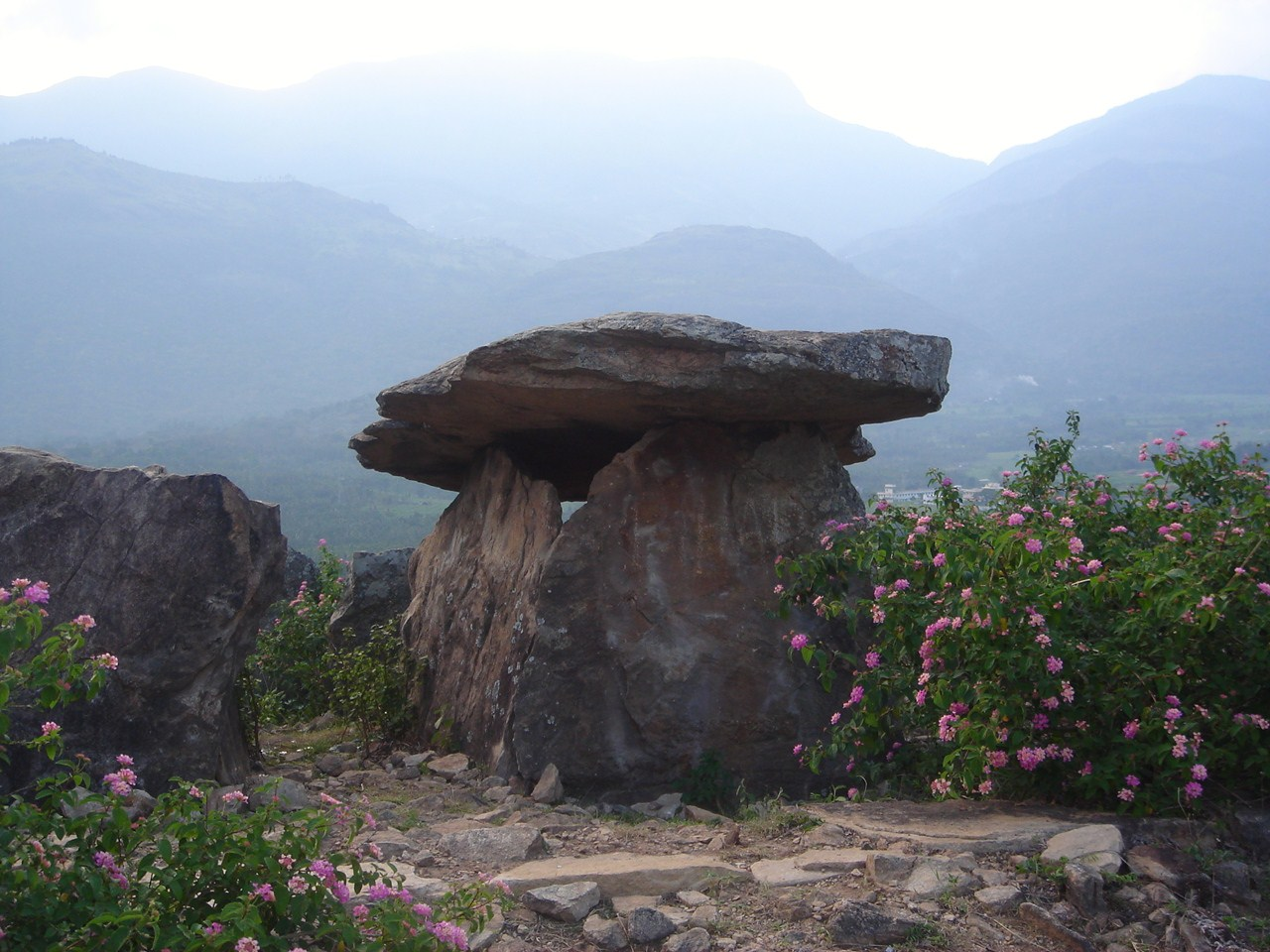
A dolmen erected by Neolithic people in Marayur, Kerala, India.

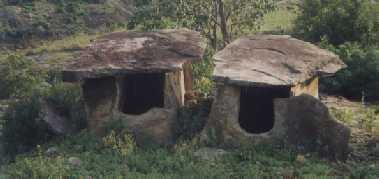
Dolmens of Marayoor, India.

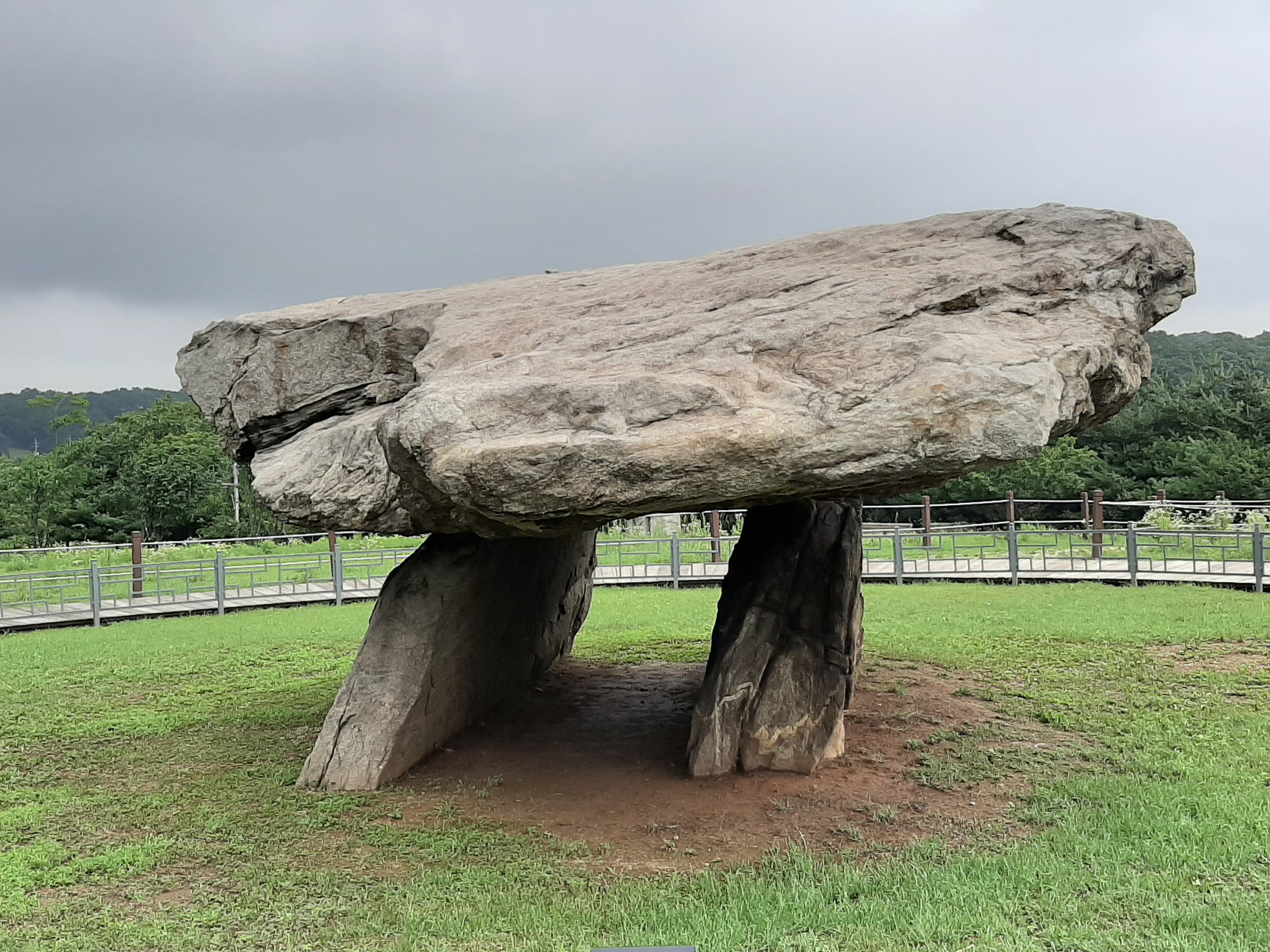
A southern-style dolmen at Ganghwa Island, South Korea

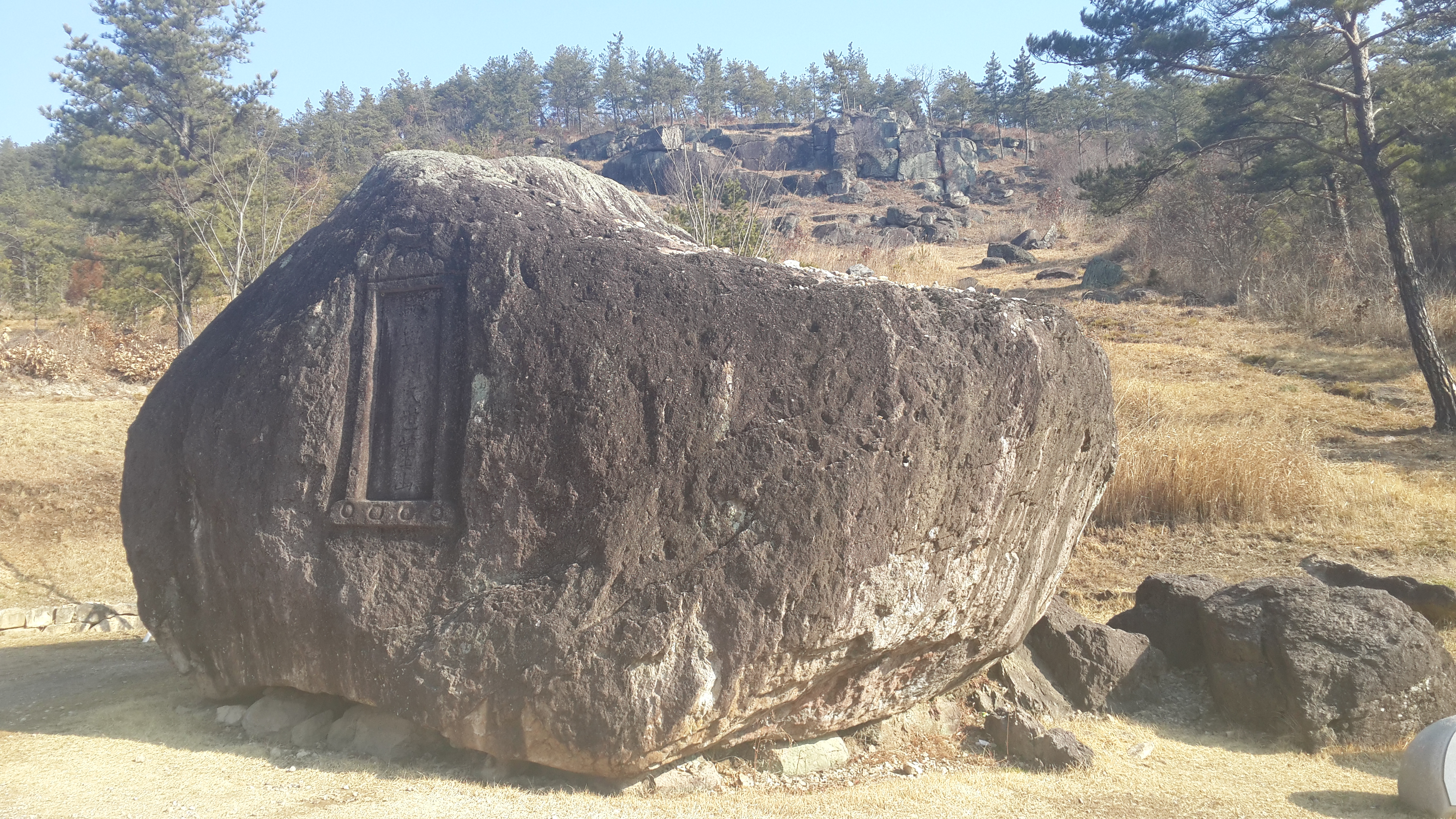
The biggest dolmen near Hwasun, South Korea

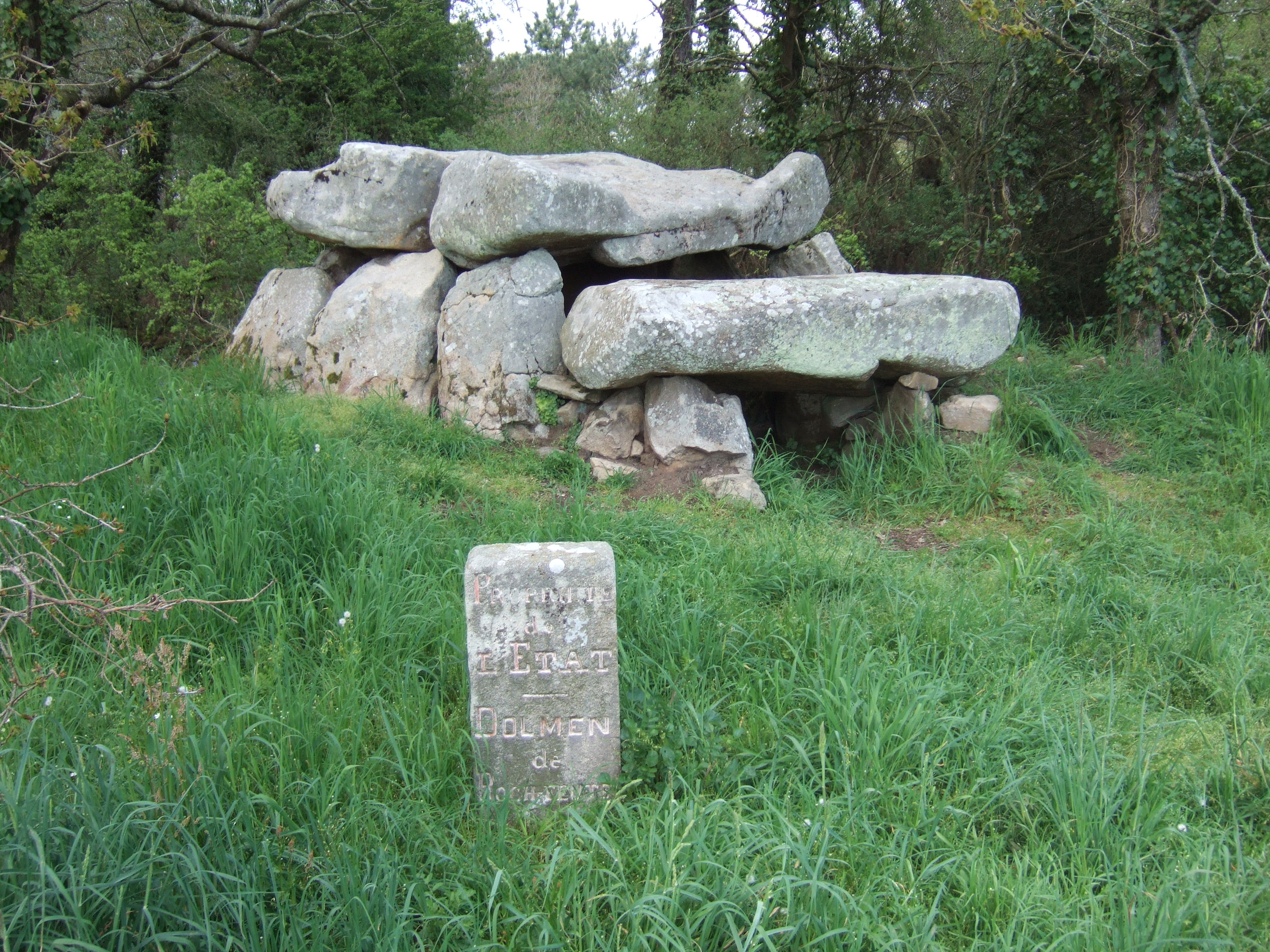
The dolmen Er-Roc'h-Feutet in Carnac, Brittany, France

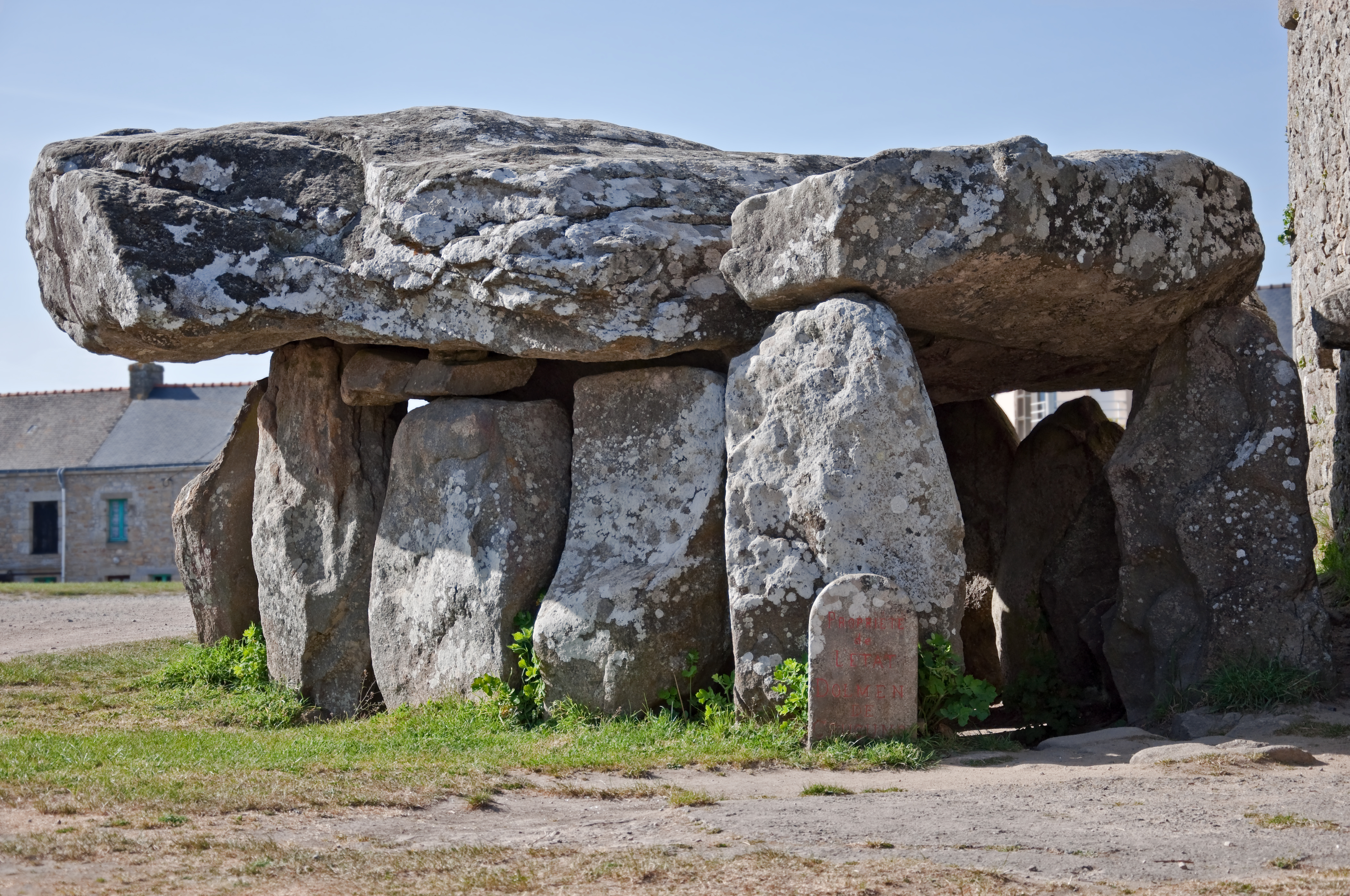
Crucuno dolmen in Plouharnel, Brittany, France

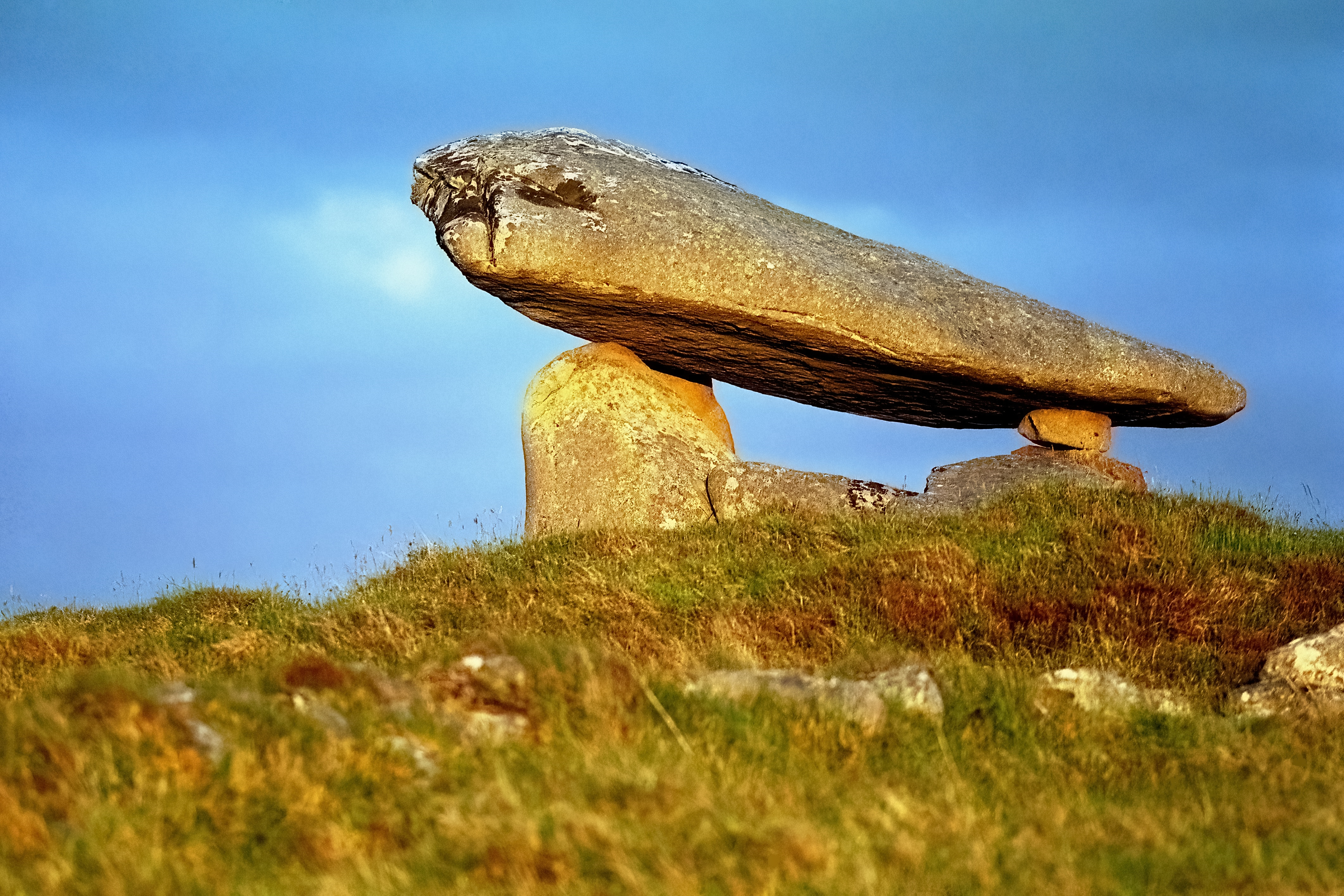
Kilclooney More dolmen near Ardara, County Donegal, Ireland

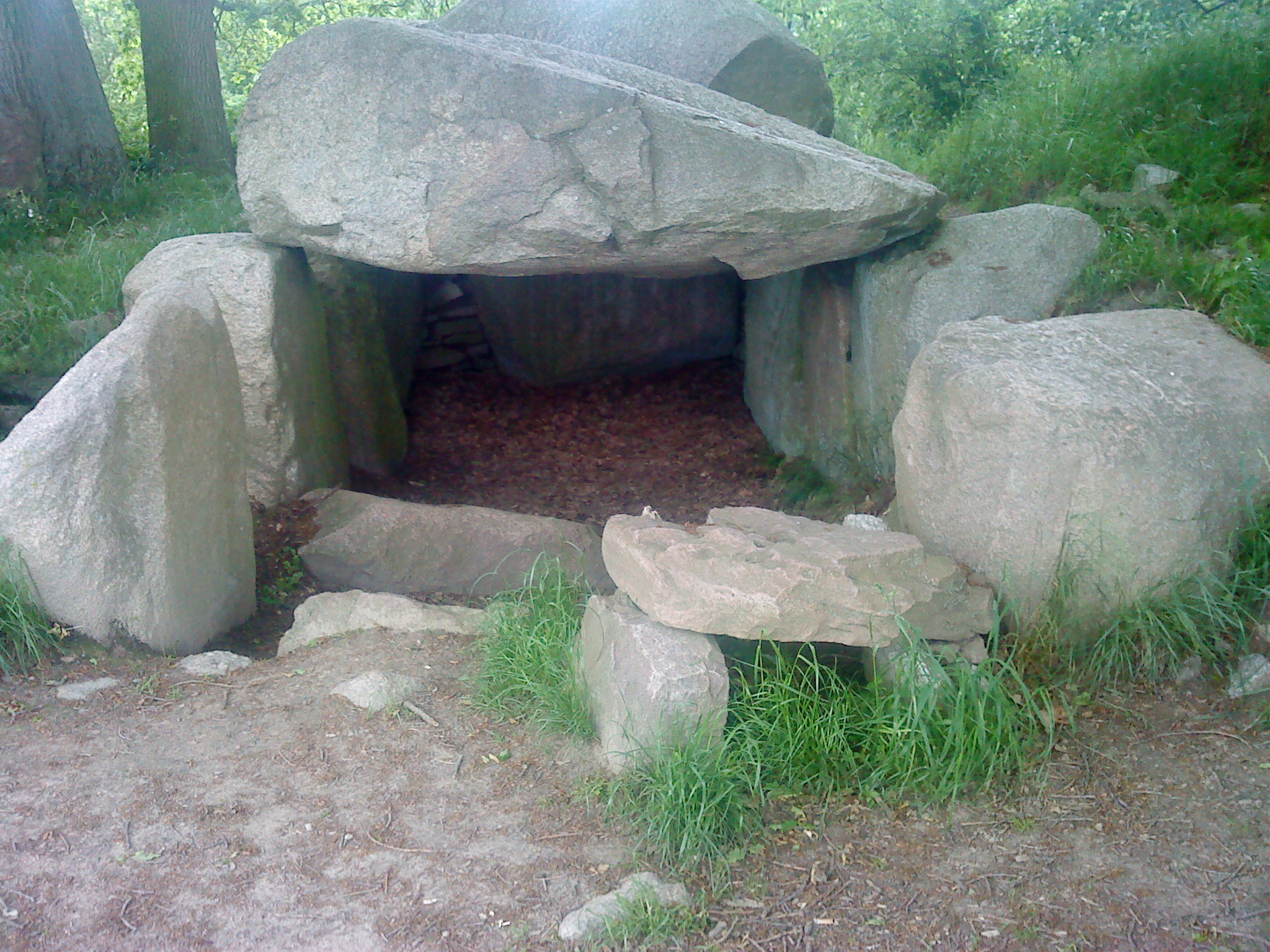
Lancken-Granitz dolmen, Germany

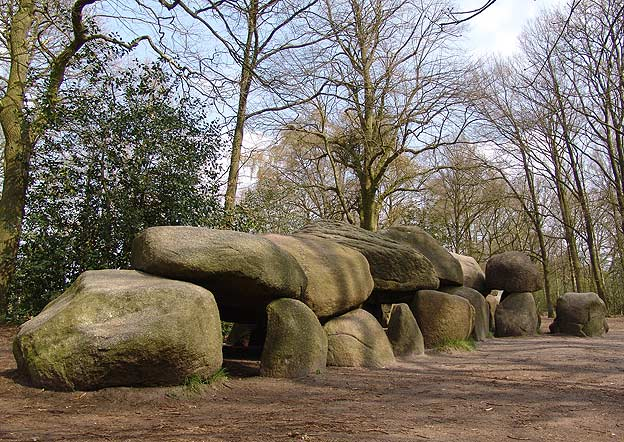
T-shaped Hunebed D27 in Borger-Odoorn, Netherlands

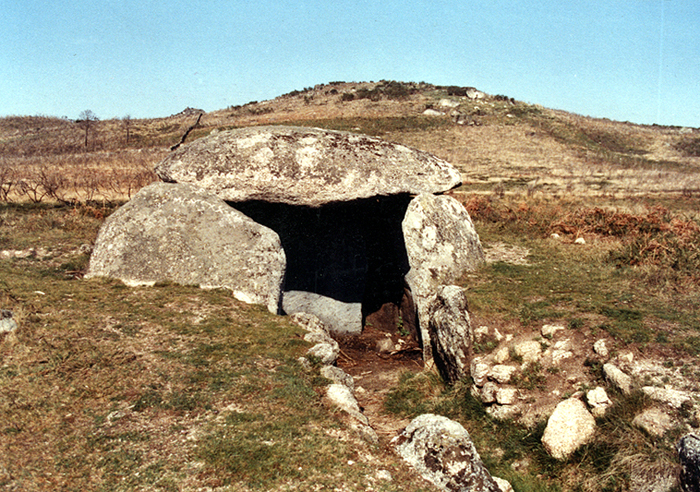
Dólmen da Aboboreira, Baião, Portugal

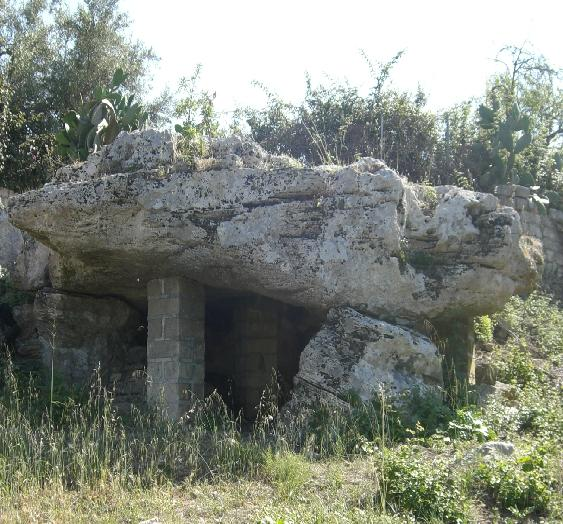
Dolmen of Avola, Sicily

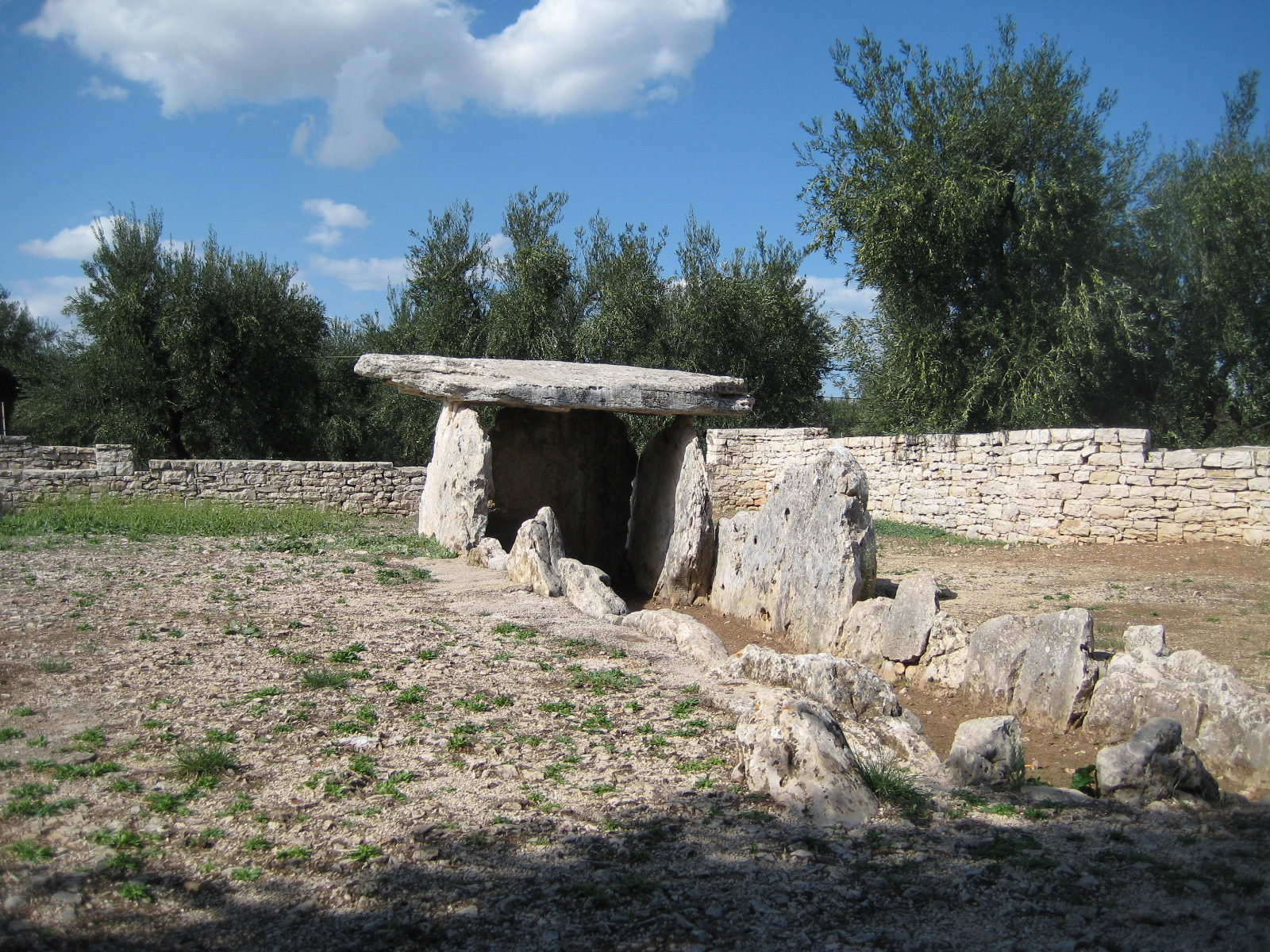
Dolmen of Bisceglie, Apulia

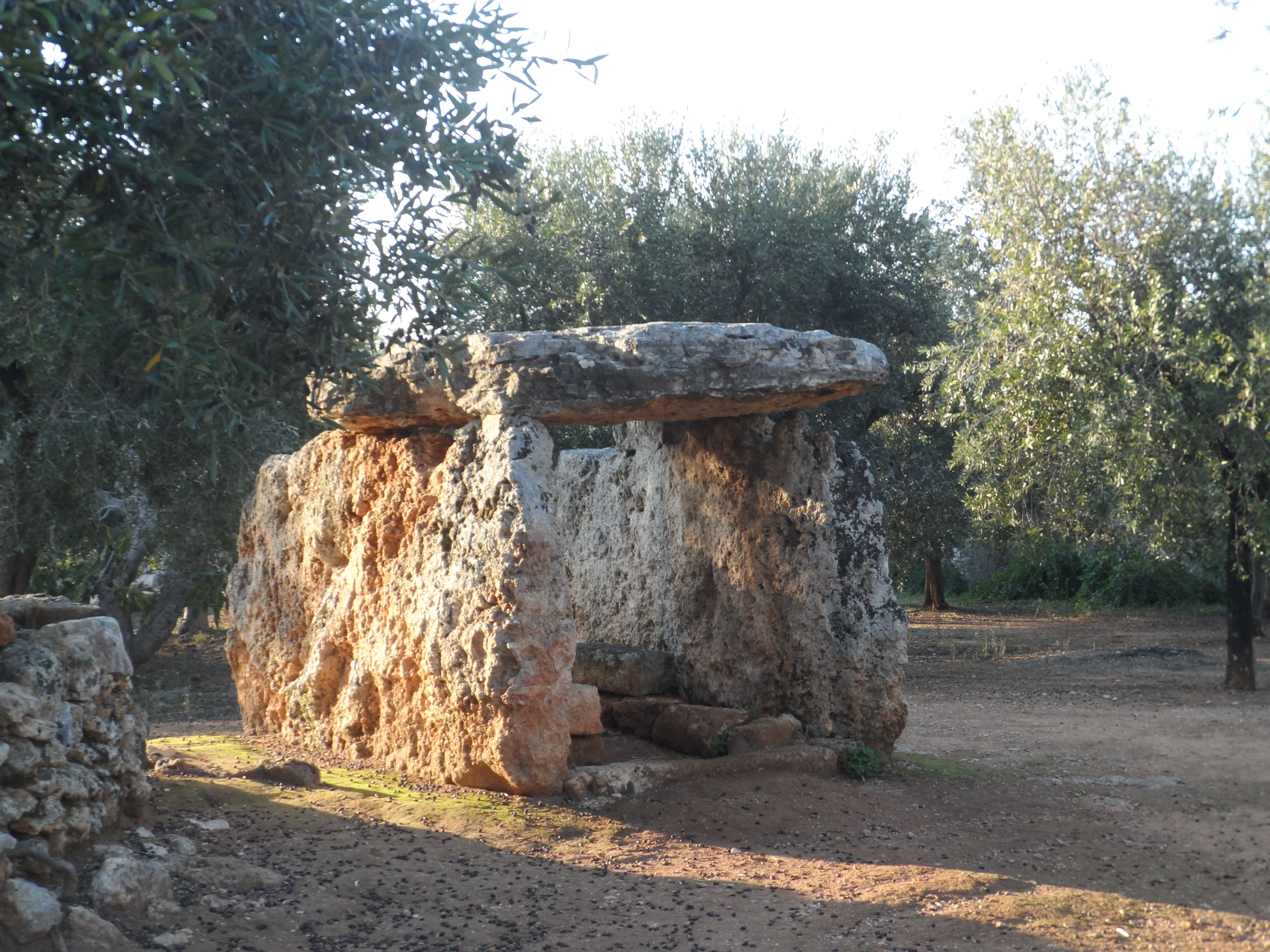
Dolmen of Fasano, Apulia

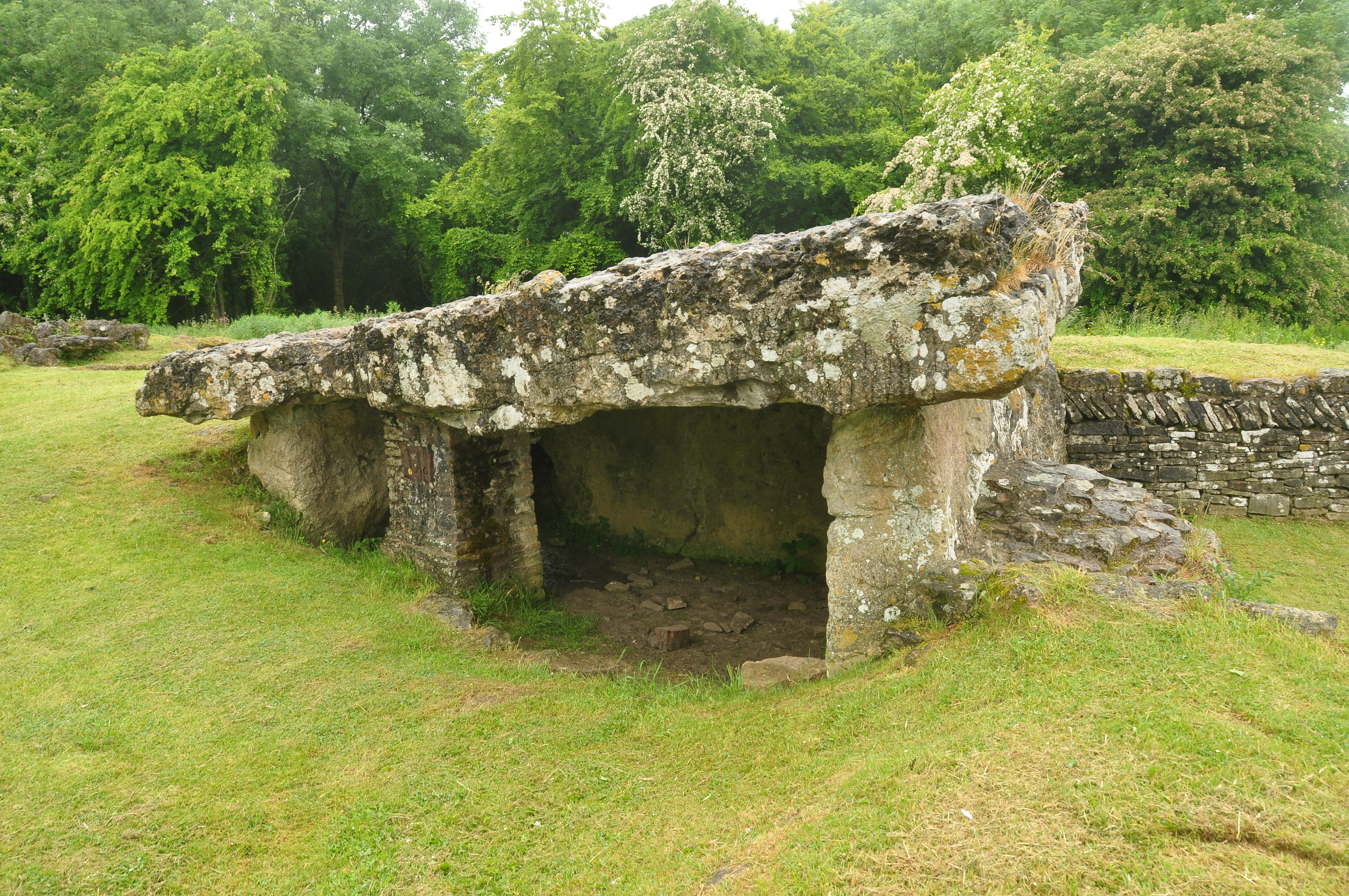
Tinkinswood, Vale of Glamorgan, Wales, around 3000 BCE

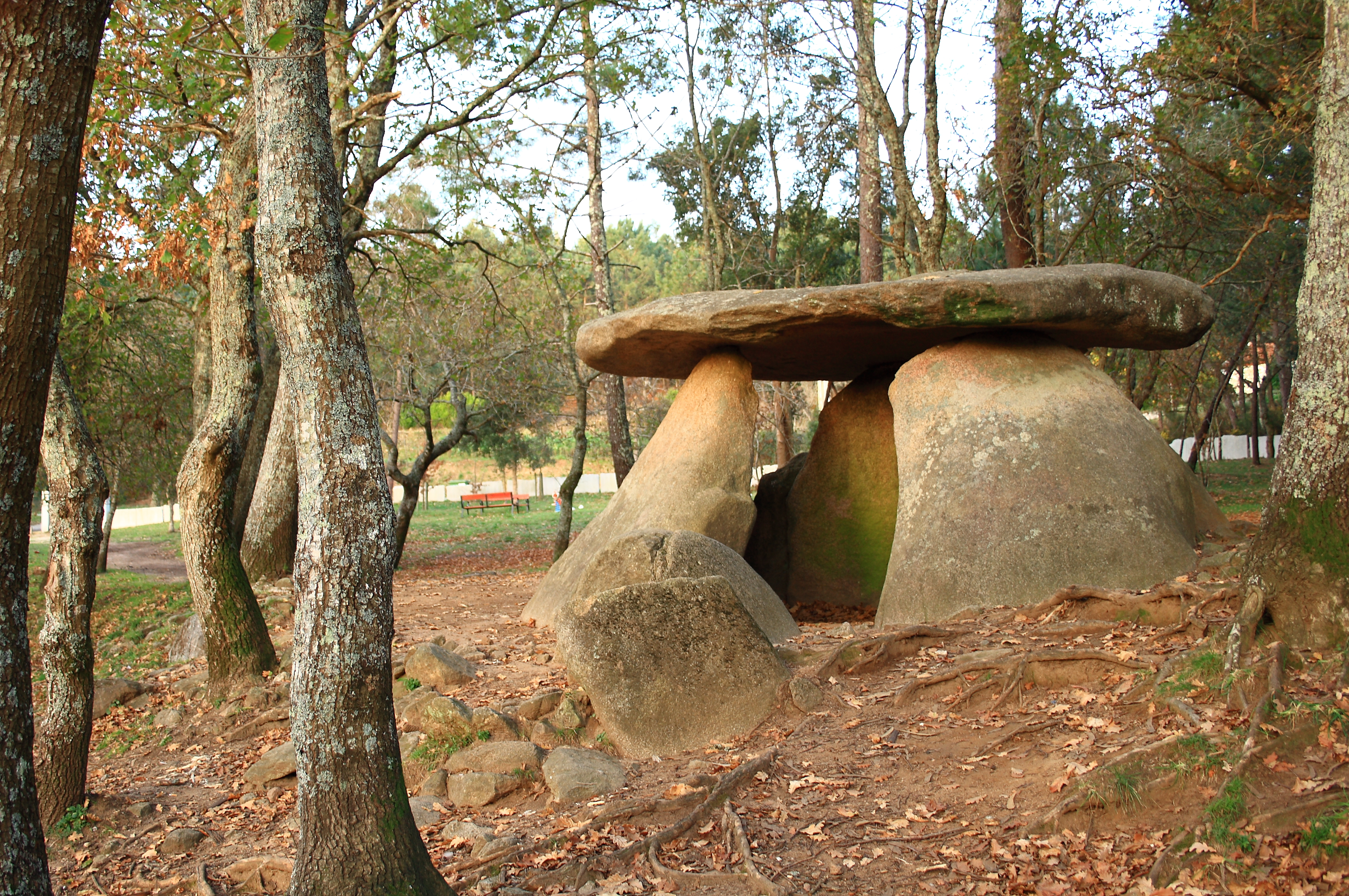
Dolmen of Oleiros, Galicia

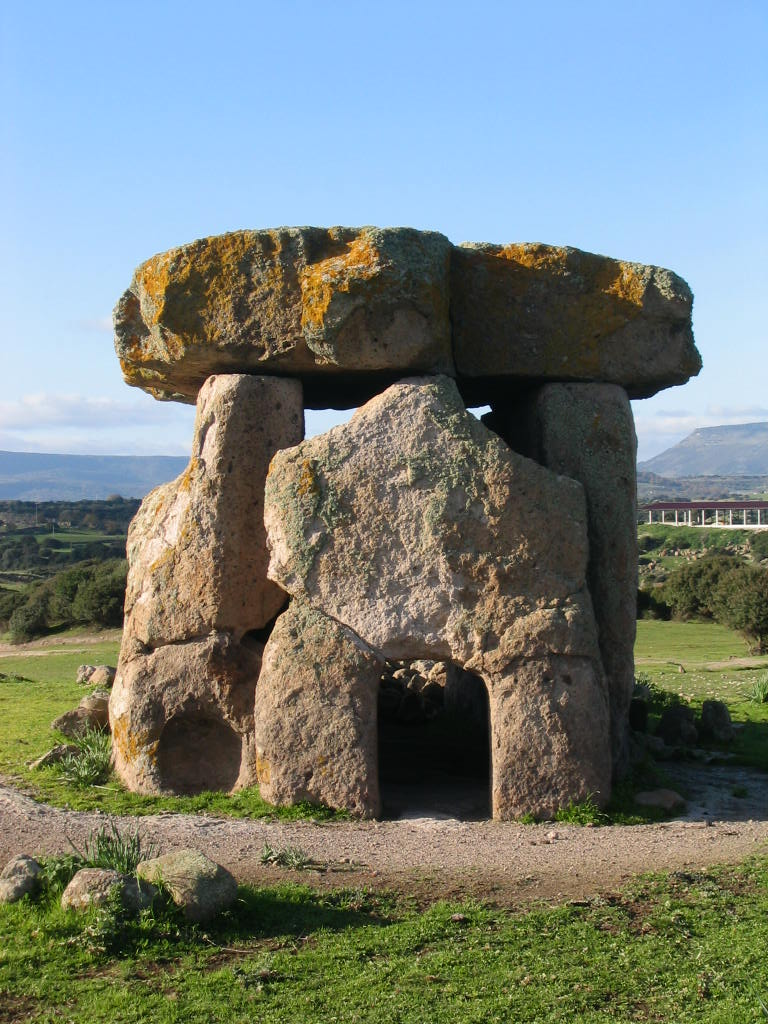
Dolmen Sa Coveccada, Mores, Sardinia

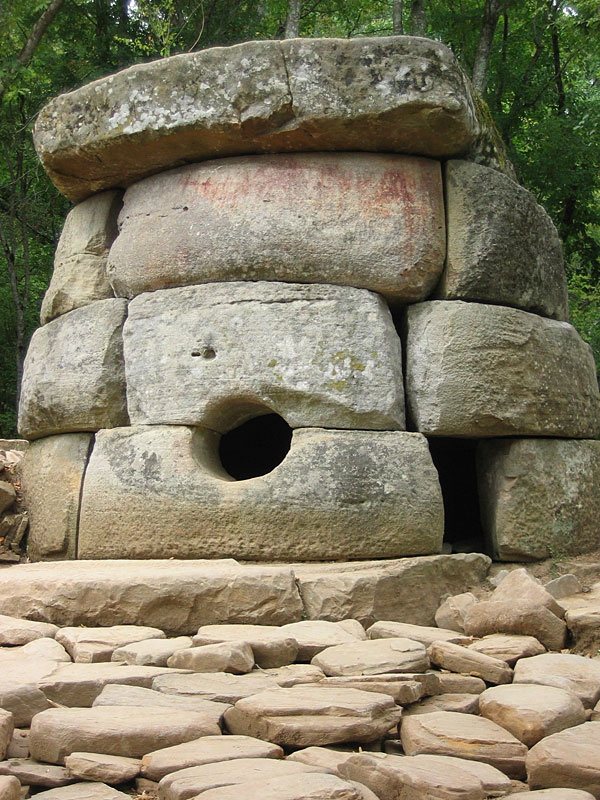
Circassia

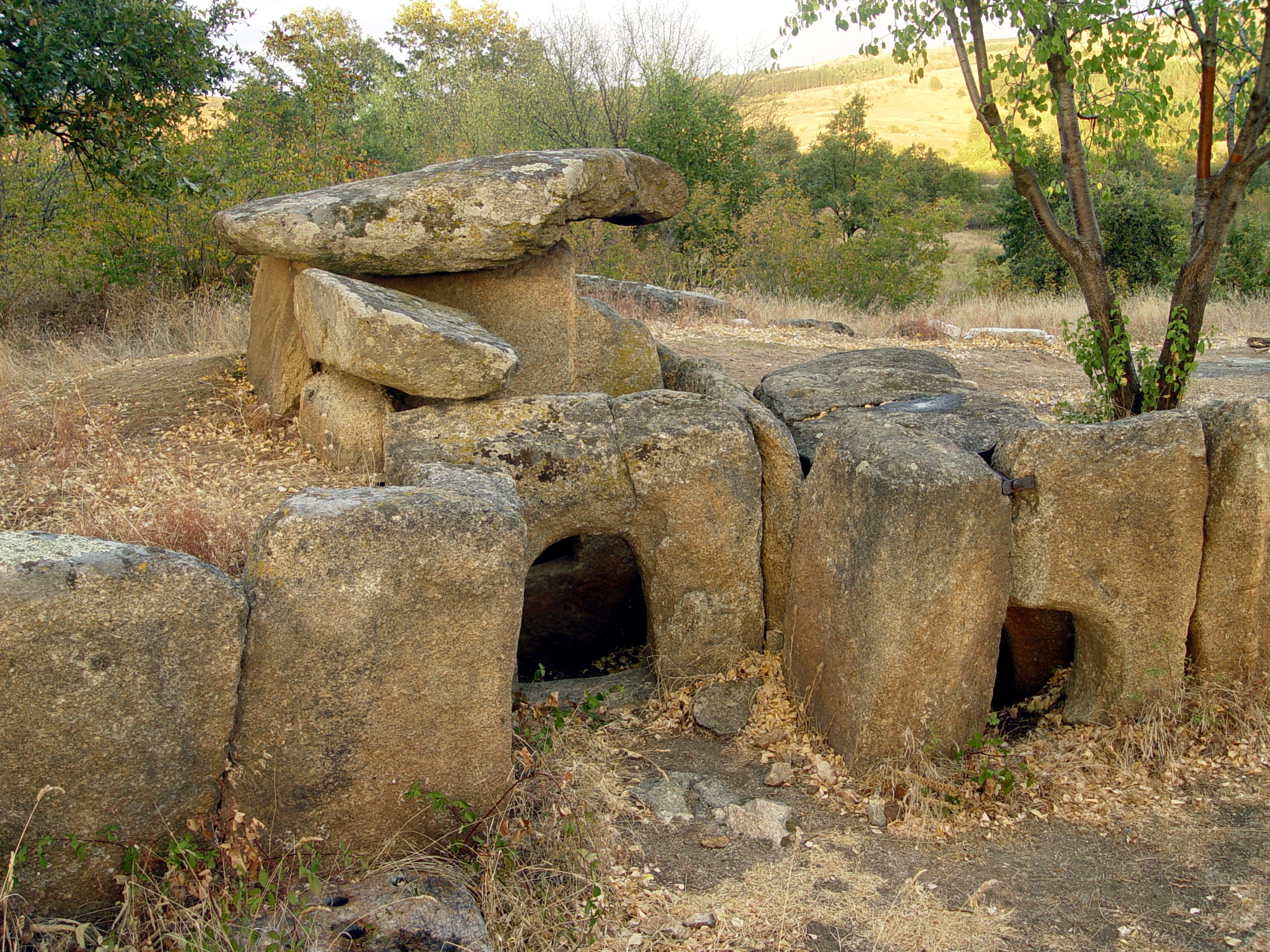
Bulgaria

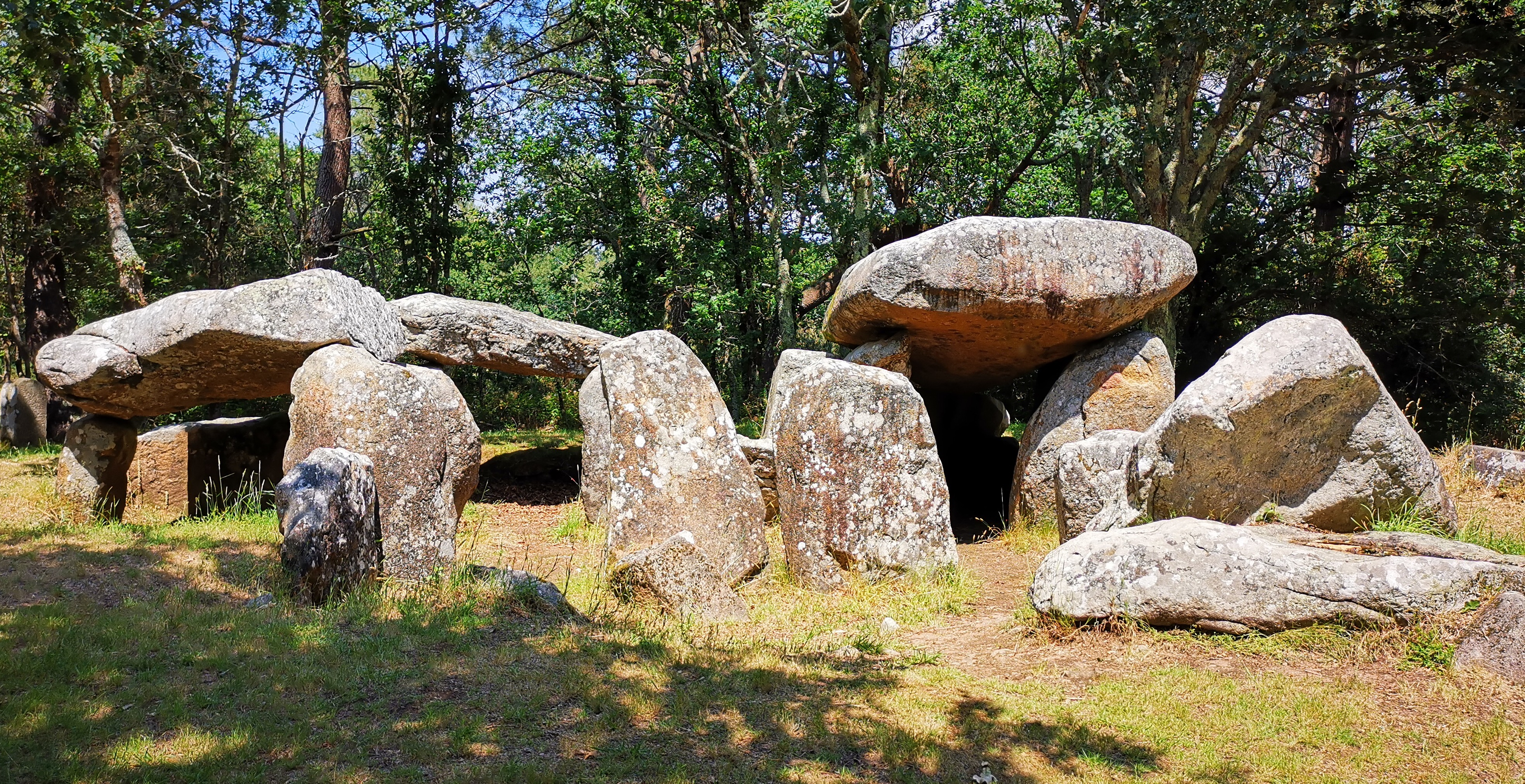
Keriaval Dolmen, Carnac, Brittany, France

== See also ==
- Irish megalithic tombs
- List of dolmens
- List of megalithic sites
- Megalithic art
- Neolithic Europe
- Nordic megalith architecture
- Stupa
