= Goldbusch =

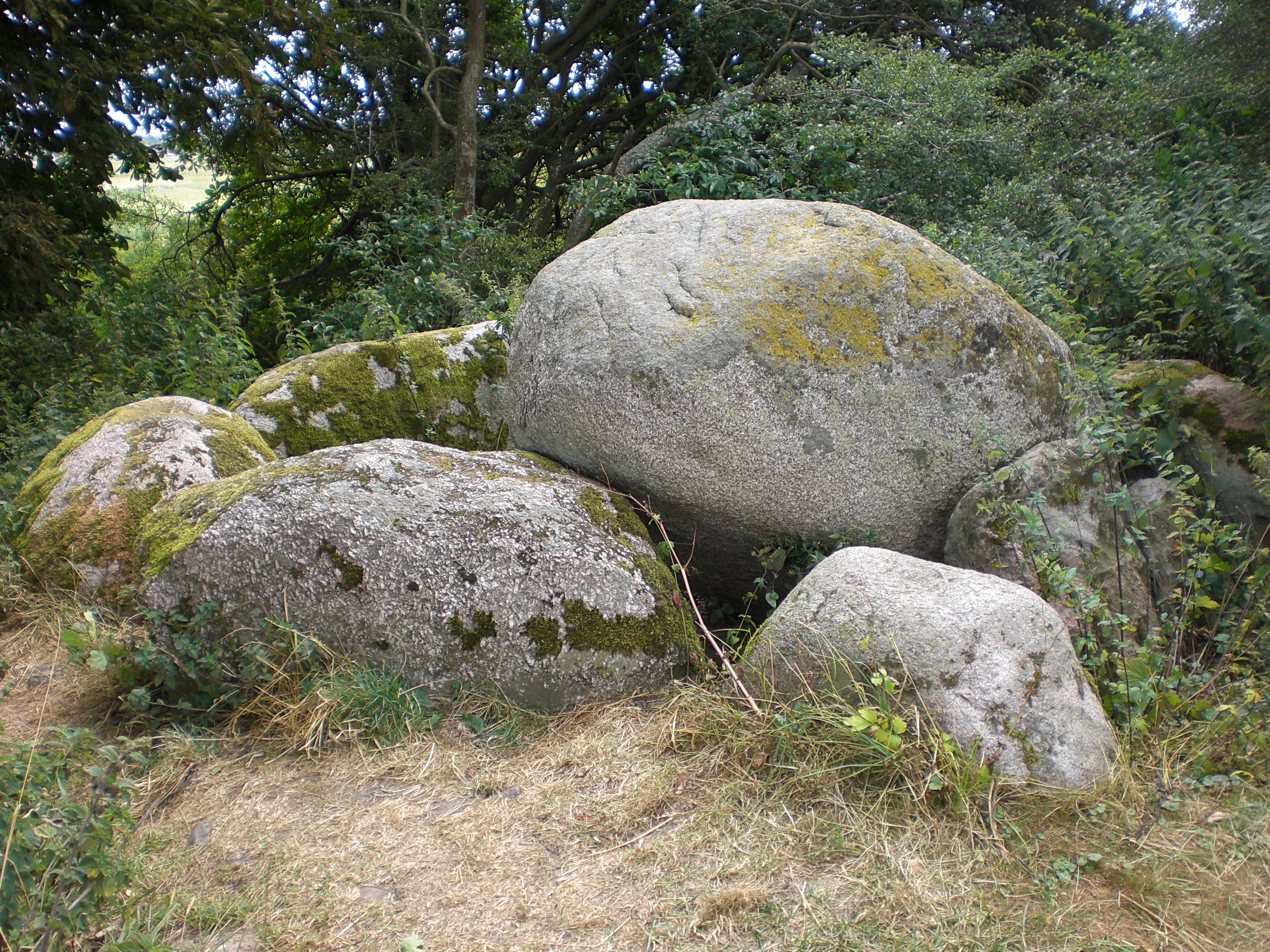
- The dolmen in 2008
- Interactive map of Goldbusch
- 54.359066°N 13.681675°E
- Type: Dolmen
- Location: Sellin, Mecklenburg-Vorpommern, Germany

History
- Built: c. 3150 BC

Site notes
- Material: Stone
- Height: 1.2 m (3 ft 11 in)
- Length: 3.5 m (11 ft)

The Goldbusch is a great dolmen (German: Großdolmen), a type prehistoric grave site, that lies between Altensien and Moritzdorf on the German Baltic Sea island of Rügen. The megalithic tomb with Sprockhoff No. 508 was built between 3500 and 2800 BC in the New Stone Age as a megalithic site of the Funnelbeaker culture (TBK).

According to Ingrid Schmidt, "Neolithic monuments are an expression of the culture and ideology of New Stone Age communities. Their creation and function are features of social development".

== Construction ==
The burial chamber has two side walls each formed from three large supporting stones. On these supporting uprights there were originally two capstones, only one of which has survived. On surviving capstone, 27 shallow depressions, so-called cup marks (German: Schälchen for "little bowls") may be seen. The burial chamber, which is oriented in an east-west direction, was originally completely covered by an earth mound and only accessible via a narrow passage at one end. The passage, which points to the southwest, is made of red sandstone slabs. The opposite end of the chamber to the entrance is formed by a single large stone. At comparable burial sites there is often a trapezoidal frame of individual standing stones surrounding the whole site, known as a Hünenbett. This is missing at Goldbusch, although there may have been one initially. The chamber was probably originally buried under an earth mound covered in turn with boulders.

== History ==
The grave site was constructed in the New Stone Age by the agricultural peoples of the Funnelbeaker culture and used for several centuries. The dead would have been laid out for extended periods outdoors. The bones were laid down together with the grave goods in the chamber. In the local area around the Goldbusch tomb was a large number of similar sites. On the Hagenow Map of 1829, 43 megalithic tombs are shown within and area little more than two kilometres long between Altensien and Seedorf. Of these, only the Goldbusch site, which is close to the shore of Lake Sellin has partly survived.

== Results of the excavation ==
In 1969, an excavation of the Goldbusch tomb was carried out, led by Ewald Schuldt. The burial chamber was, at that time, already badly damaged. It was found that the supporting stones of the chamber were not sunk into the ground, but just rested on the surface and were fixed with stone wedges and clay, indicating a late construction, since the uprights of the early tombs were sunk deep into the ground. The capstone had slipped down into the grave chamber. Only remnants of the original grave goods were found. As well as flint arrowheads, six axes of the same material, a gouge, various shards of pottery and two decorated pottery jars were found.

== See also ==
- Megaliths in Mecklenburg-Vorpommern

== Literature ==
- Ingrid Schmidt, Hünengrab und Opferstein – Bodendenkmale auf der Insel Rügen, Hinstorff Verlag Rostock, 2001, ISBN 3-356-00917-6, p. 27 ff.
