= Nobbin =

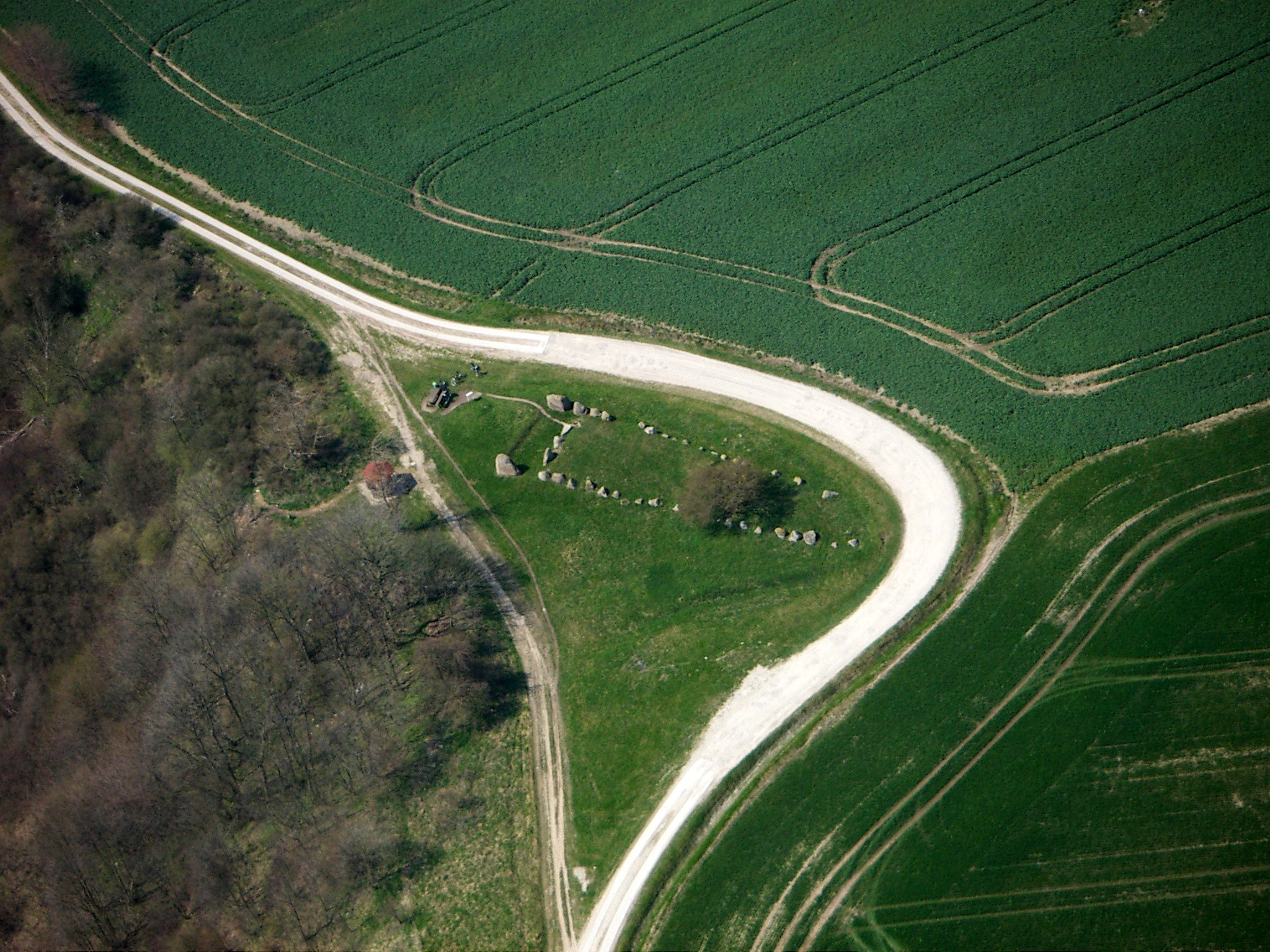
Riesenberg barrow near Nobbin

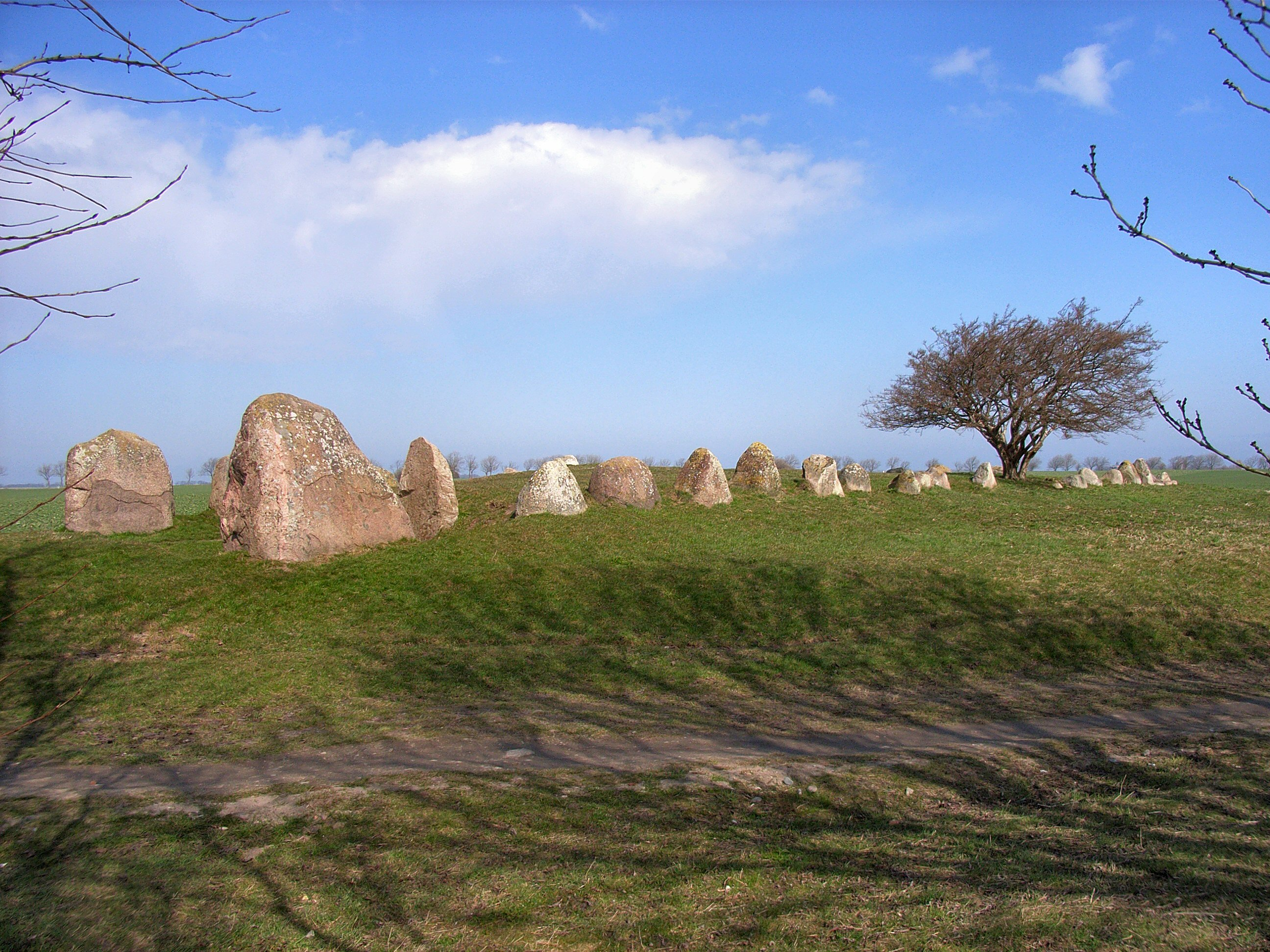
Riesenberg barrow from the east

Nobbin is a village in the municipality of Putgarten on the Wittow peninsula on the German Baltic Sea island of Rügen. The village, comprising just a few houses, lies between the road from Altenkirchen to Arkona and the bay of Tromper Wiek. As a result of its attractive location between Cape Arkona and the broad, over 10 km long beach of the Schaabe, the village is dominated by tourism (B&Bs and holiday apartments).

== Riesenberg barrow ==
Nobbin is best known for the megalithic tomb known as the Riesenberg (also Großsteingrab Riesenberg). The tomb was constructed of glacial erratic boulders and dates back to the New Stone Age in Rügen. It is one of the largest stone graves in North Germany and lies just a few metres from the steep coast on the bay of Tromper Wiek, immediately by the cliff top path (54°39′11″N 13°23′36″E).

The trapezoidal enclosure, which originally had 53 large boundary stones, is 34 metres long and 8 to 11 metres wide (39 stones have survived). In the north-east were two transverse dolmens, of which only one is well preserved. It is 1.4 metres high, 1.8 metres long and 1.1 metres wide. On the southwest side two guardian stones (Wächtersteine) in front of the enclosure rise to a height of over 3 metres, otherwise they are typical, especially of Scandinavian dolmens, but also similar in dimensions to the Dolmens of Dwasieden and those in Dummertevitz on Rügen. The presence of guardian stones is rare in Germany, but is explained by the proximity of the site to the Danish islands.

During excavations in 1970 by Ewald Schuldt, Neolithic finds were made: three crosscutting (querschneidende) arrowheads, a sword, some broken vessels and a few bone fragments (including two skulls). In the northern grave chamber were the remains of an urn burial from the 5th century B.C. Between the guardian stones were shards of pottery from the Slavic era Rani tribe and an Arabic silver coin from the 9th century, amongst other things. This showed that the Riesenberg was a significant site for the island inhabitants for millennia.

== See also ==
- Megaliths in Mecklenburg-Vorpommern

== Literature ==
- Ingrid Schmidt: Hünengrab und Opferstein – Bodendenkmale auf der Insel Rügen. 1. Auflage. Hinstorff Verlag, Rostock 2001, ISBN 3-356-00917-6.
- Ewald Schuldt: Der Riesenberg von Nobbin, Kreis Rügen. - In: Bodendenkmalpflege in Mecklenburg, Jahrbuch 1971 (1972), 153–160.
