= Great Dolmen of Dwasieden =

Great dolmen of Dwasieden
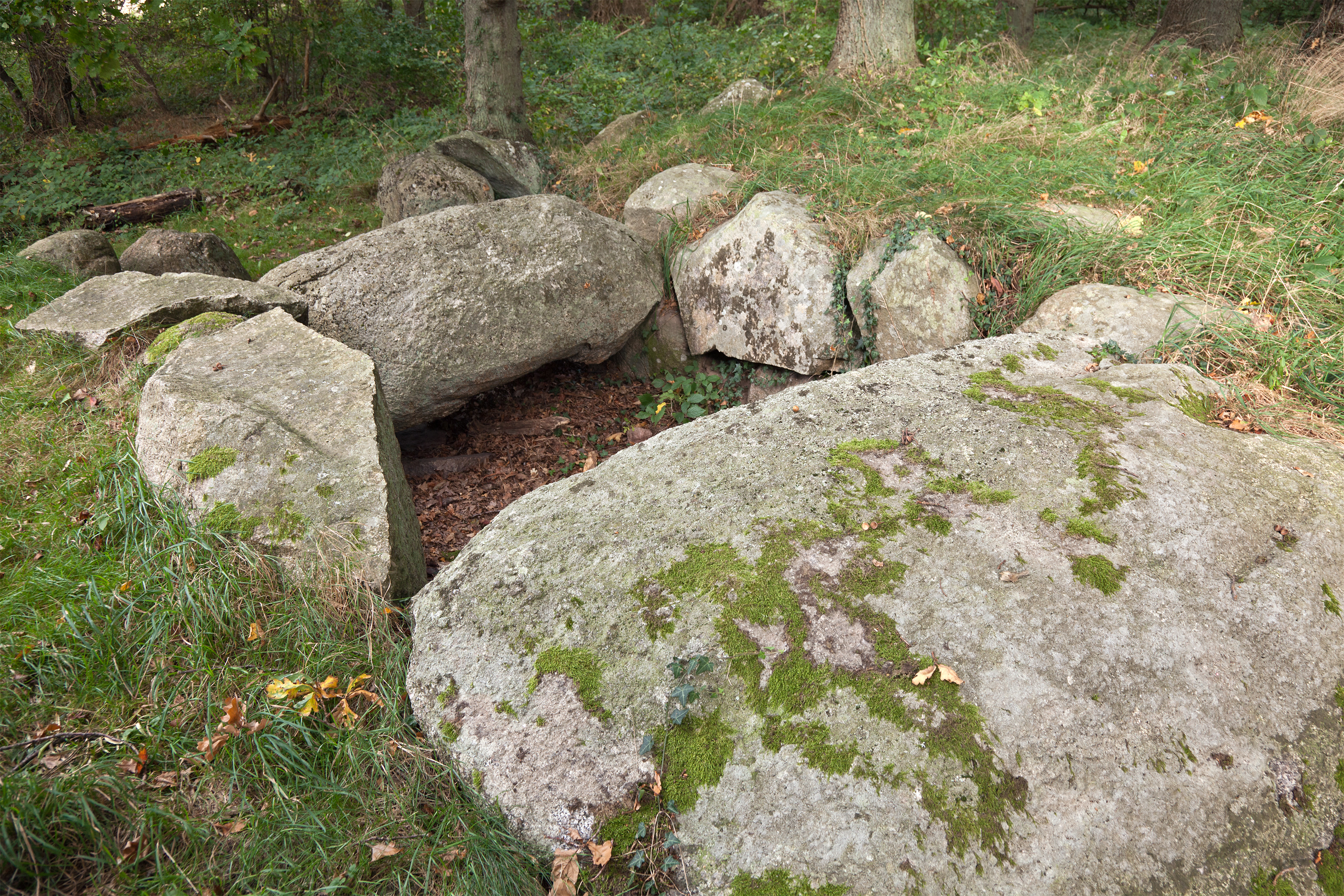
- The dolmen in 2011
- Interactive map of Great dolmen of Dwasieden
- 54°30′07.48″N 13°36′32.90″E
- Type: Dolmen
- Location: Sassnitz, Mecklenburg-Vorpommern, Germany

History
- Built: c. 3150 BC

Site notes
- Material: Stone

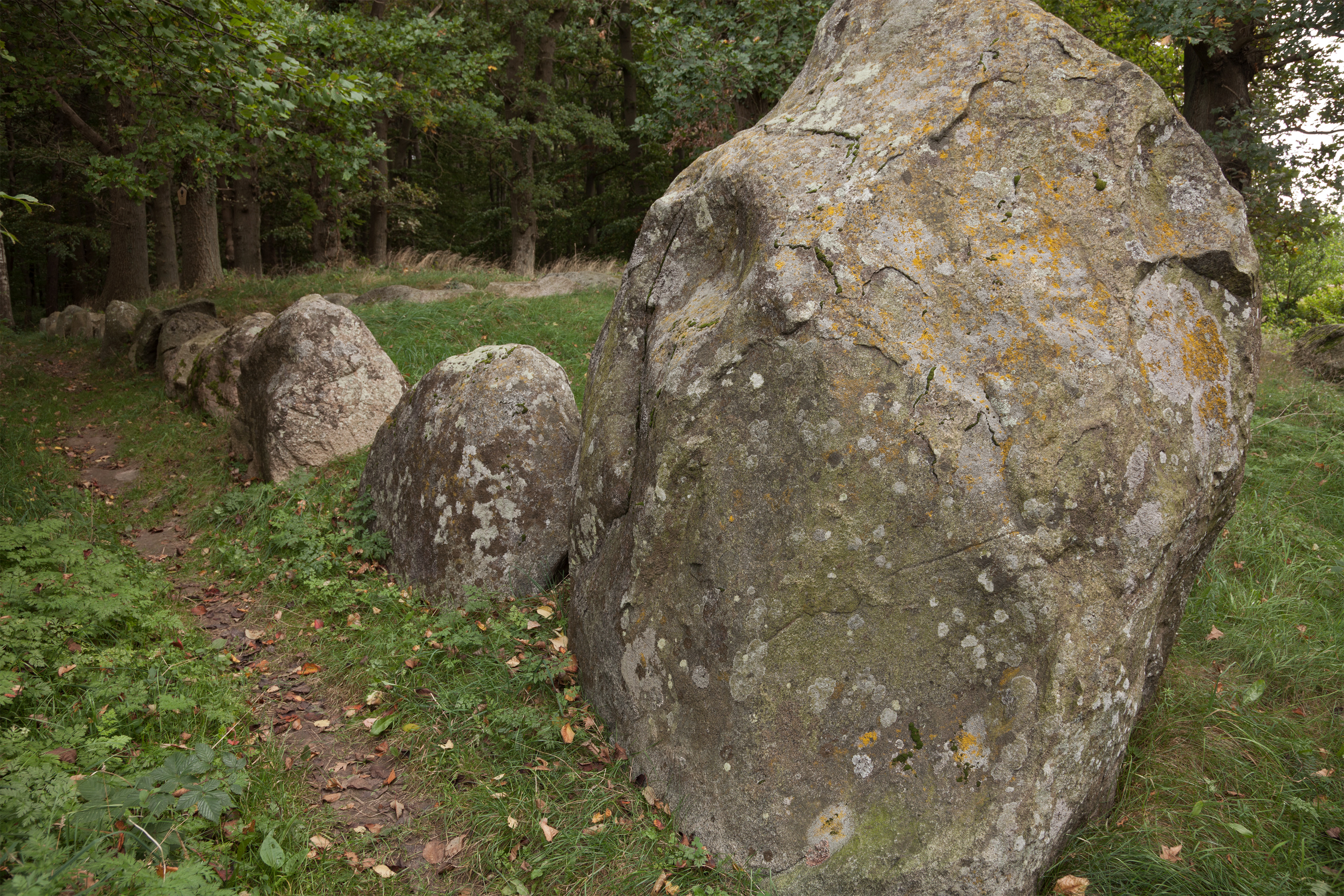

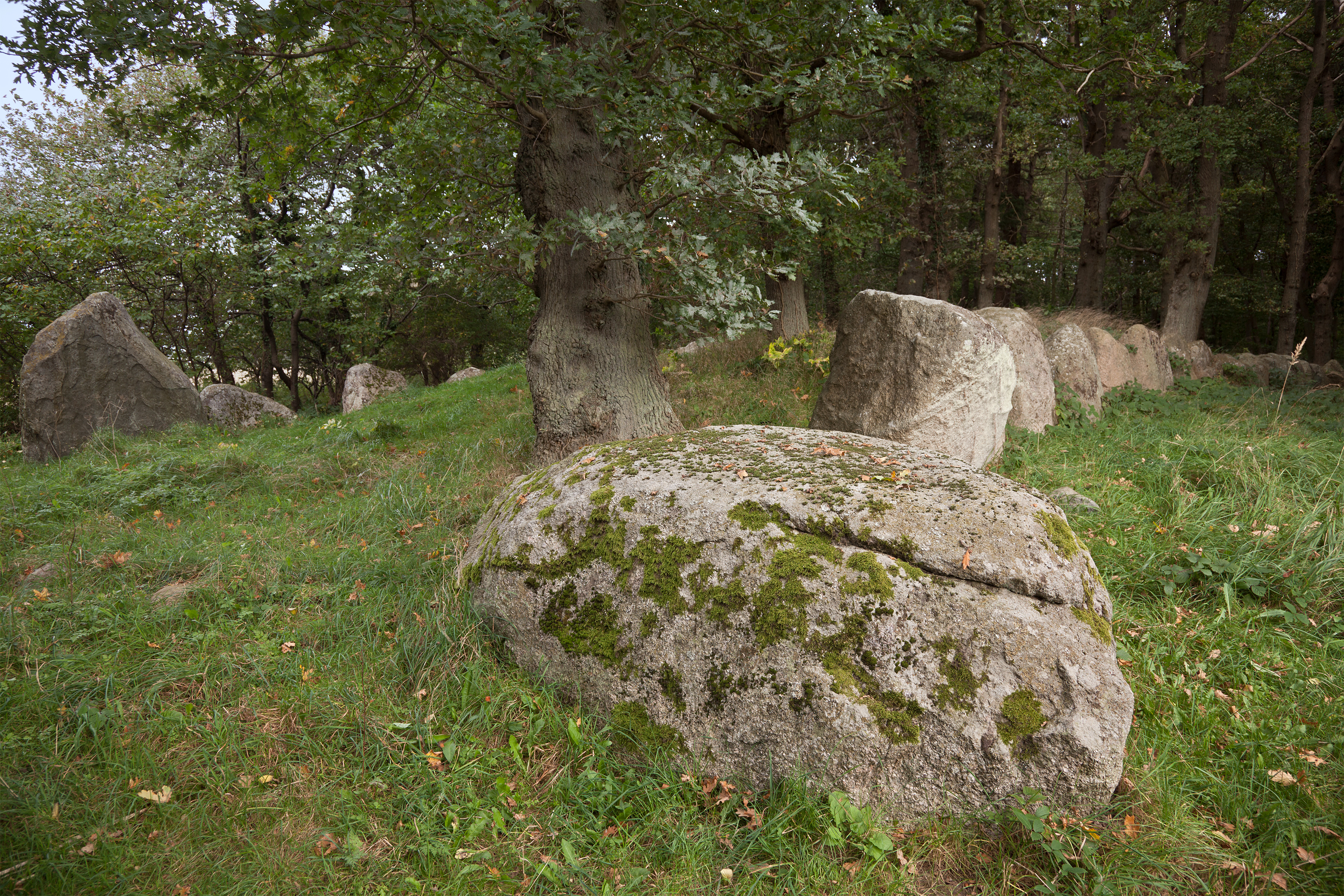

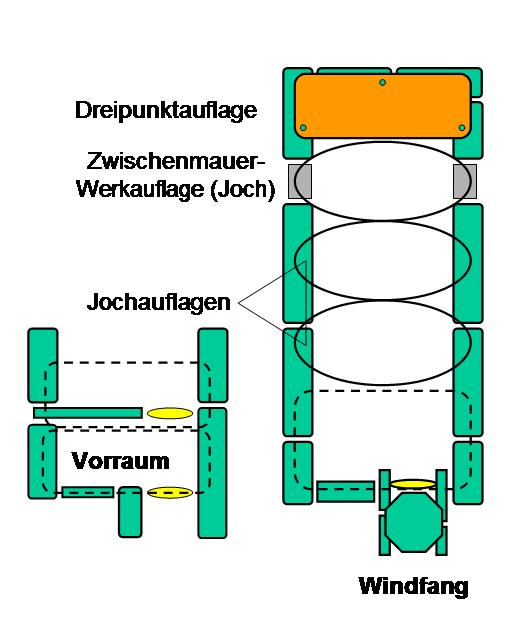
Diagram of the great dolmen

The Great dolmen of Dwasieden (German: Großdolmen von Dwasieden), is a great dolmen in the borough of Sassnitz, on the Jasmund peninsula of Germany's largest island, Rügen. It was excavated in 1970 by Ewald Schuldt and is designated a Sprockhoff No. 472. The megalithic site of the Funnelbeaker culture (TBK) was constructed between 3500 and 2800 BC.

According to Ingrid Schmidt, "Neolithic monuments are an expression of the culture and ideology of New Stone Age communities. Their creation and function are features of social development". The site was painted in 1806 by the Greifswald-born artist Caspar Friedrich. His diagrams and sketches are kept in the Ashmolean Museum of Art & Archaeology at Oxford.

== Description ==
The great dolmen is located near the southwestern edge of the forest, south of Lancken, less than 500 metres from the Baltic Sea. The great dolmen lies in a roughly northeast–southwest-oriented, trapezoidal hunebed about 35 metres long and 12.5 to 7.5 metres wide. Of the 54 kerb stones - including the four guardian stones - 41 have survived. The rectangular, roughly east–west-oriented chamber at the wide end of the frame, with its western entrance and porch (Windfang) consists of seven supporting stones (orthostats), a half stone (Halbstein) the height of the uprights and five slabs, on which there are three large (on the chamber) and three small capstones. Only the central capstone of the chamber is missing. One of the four guardian stones at the southwest end, which had already been overturned in the past, has 40 cup marks, one of the kerb stones has three more. The site is a prime example of the porch dolmen (Großdolmen mit Windfang), typical of this region. A two-metre-long porch runs past the support-high half stone to the 4 metre long, 1.7 metre wide and 1.4 metre high chamber. The hall consists of red sandstone slabs, annealed flint and a clay floor.

Neither human bones nor cremated remains were found, but it has been established that it was later used by members of the Globular Amphora culture. The artefacts found include 1,777 shards, the largest amount of pottery in a site in Mecklenburg-Western Pomerania. There were also 19 blades, eleven amber beads, (two shaped like a double axe), eight cups, six crosscutters, six scrapers (Klingenkratzer), five biconical vessels, five bowls, two funnel bowls, a scraper (Schaber), a hammerstone and a narrow chisel.

== See also ==
- Megaliths in Mecklenburg-Vorpommern

== Literature ==
- Ewald Schuldt: Die mecklenburgischen Megalithgräber. Deutscher Verlag der Wissenschaft, Berlin, 1972.
