= Weetwood Moor =

Moor near Wooler, Northumberland, UK

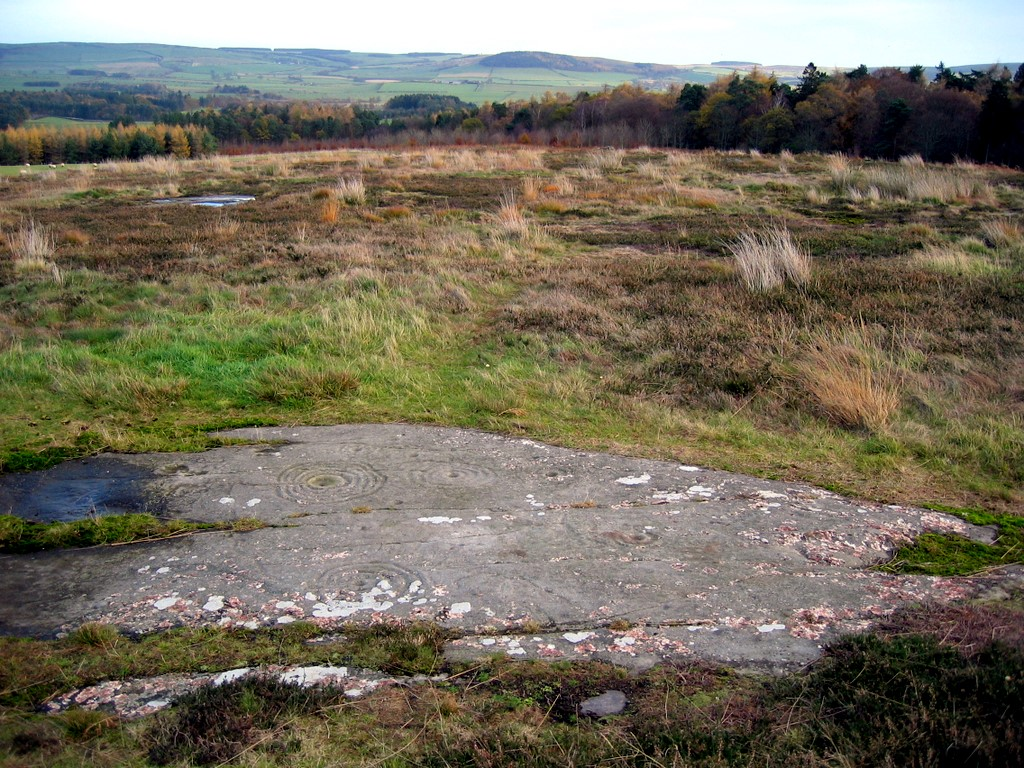
Weetwood Moor with a Cup and ring mark panel in foreground

Weetwood Moor near Wooler, Northumberland is a moor in the North of England which contains a scheduled monument. It has 26 known panels of Cup and ring mark petroglyphs carved into the sandstone.

The rock art is prehistoric and could be either Neolithic or early Bronze Age as it has been dated to between 1500 and 3800 BCE, though not everything on the site is old, the cairn near the rock art is modern.

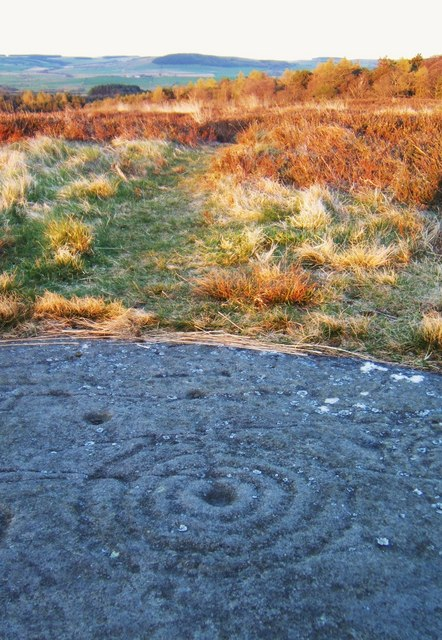

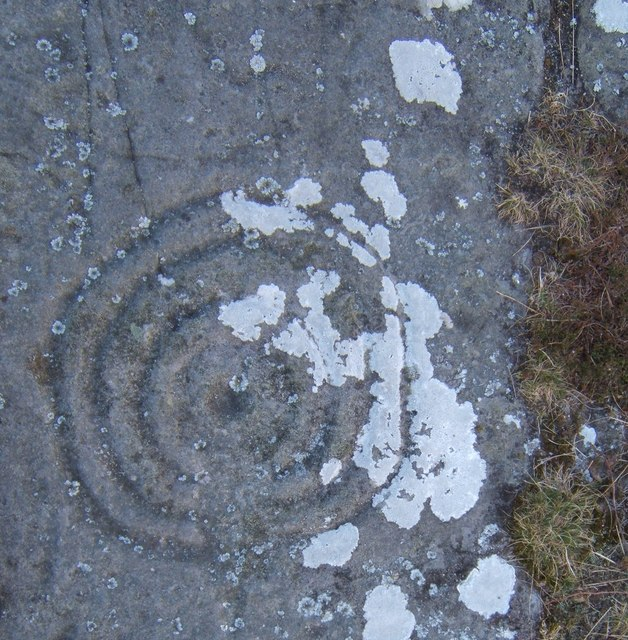
Lichen re-covering the art

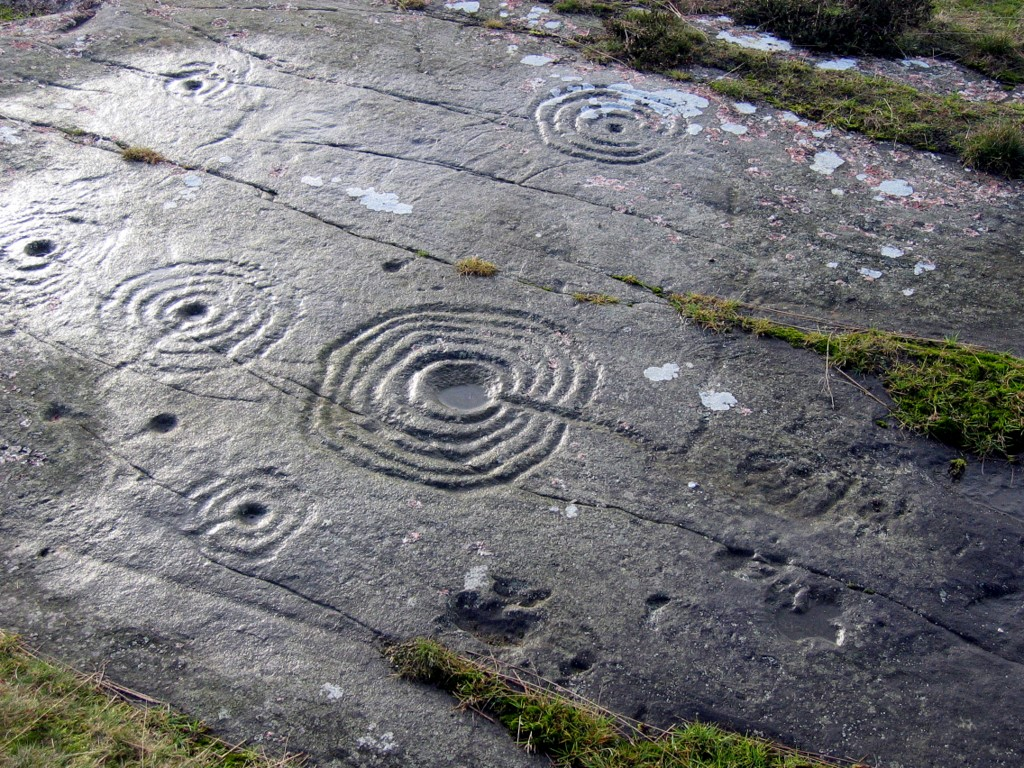

== See also ==
Media related to Weetwood Moor at Wikimedia Commons
