= Guardian stones =

Megalithic sites

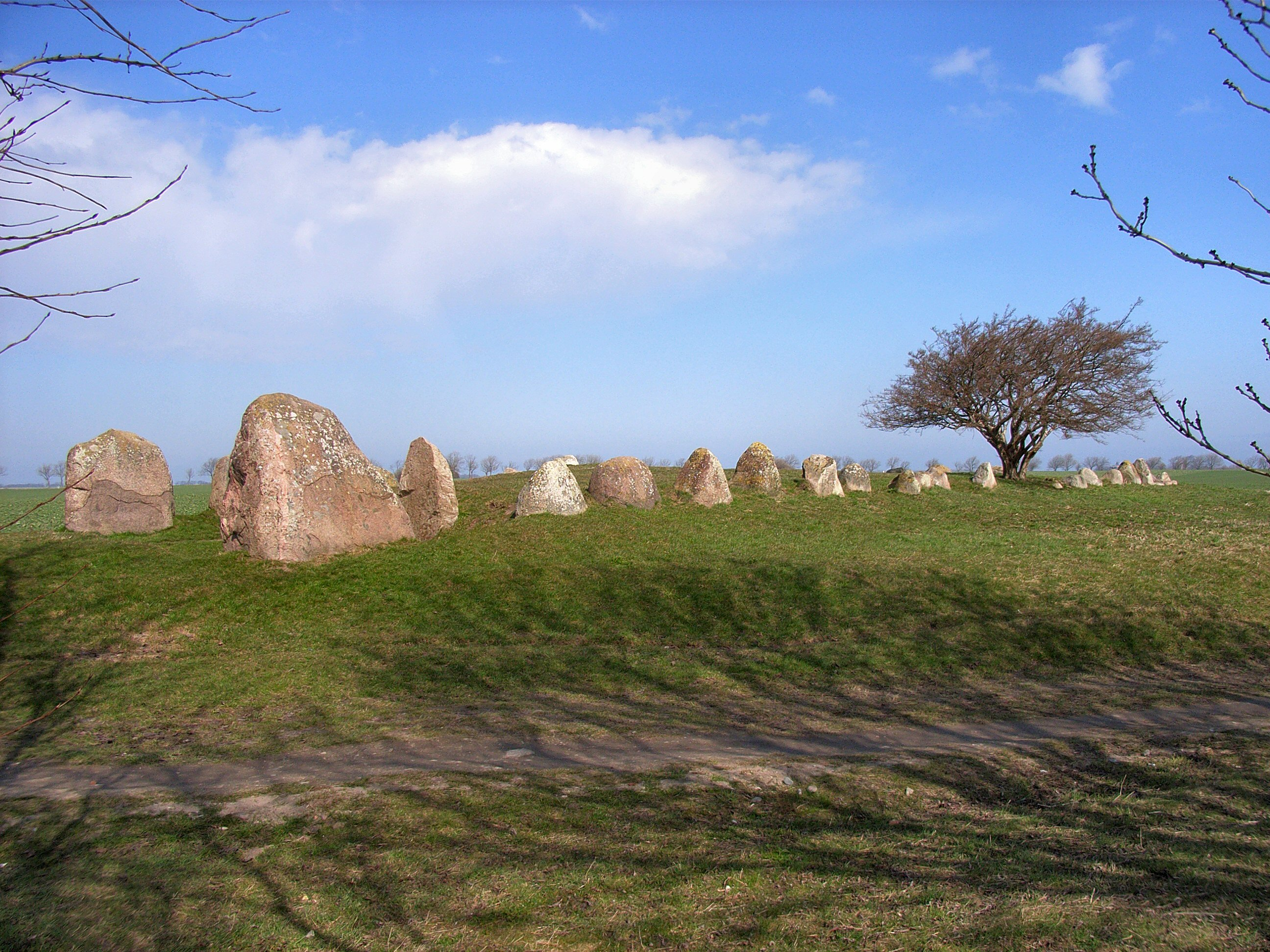
Nobbin on Rügen

Guardian stones (German: Wächtersteine) are standing stones, always occurring in pairs, at the corners of rectangular and trapezoidally-arranged stone enclosures (hunebeds) around a dolmen. They are found especially in Scandinavia, in the German states of Mecklenburg-Vorpommern, Lower Saxony (Salongrab), Saxony-Anhalt (Drebenstedt, Leetze, Winterfeld) and occasionally in Holstein (Alter Hau). They are strikingly large stone blocks that form the corner post of enclosures or project above them like antae and lend the stone enclosures a monumental appearance.

Guardian stones are typical of trapezoidal enclosures. In Germany the most impressive examples of trapezoidal sites are Dwasieden, Dummertevitz and Nobbin on the island of Rügen.

- At the Great Dolmen of Dwasieden, guardian stones of 3.3 and 3.5 metres in height guard the wide end of the dolmen and ones of 1.4 and 1.6 metres high stand sentinel at the narrow end.
- At the wide end of the trapezoidal enclosure of Nobbin there are guardian stones of 3.3 and 3.4 metres in height, each weighing 25 tons. At the narrow end they are 1.5 metres high and weigh just under six tons.

On the mainland, only a stone block at the enclosure of Kritzow, Parchim, reaches such a height. The guardian stones of sites in the Altmark are up to 2.8 metres high.

At several sites, guardian stones have been so arranged that the corner blocks jut out at an angle from the phalanx of stones. For example, the simple dolmen of Frauenmark, Parchim county, and the passage grave of Mellen, in the county of Prignitz. At the large passage grave of Naschendorf, Nordwestmecklenburg all the blocks at the narrow end are arranged in a concave way, so that the corners are very prominent. The same shape is seen at the wide end of the trapezoidal bed of Kruckow, Demmin county.

Entirely outside the phalanx of the enclosure are the guardian stones at a number of rectangular enclosures. These blocks are anta-like extensions of the stone sides of the enclosure and stand in front of it. Other guardian stones stand out very little or not at all from the rest of the stone enclosure. Examples are the enclosures of Grevesmühlen-Barendorf, Nordwestmecklenburg, Barkvieren, Rostock county and Mankmoos, Nordwestmecklenburg.

A variation of the guardian stone concept are those ends of long enclosures where all (four or five) almost equally high stones are many times higher than the stones along the two sides, as is the case at the Visbeker sites (Visbeker Braut und Bräutigam).

Investigations of the guardian stones of Dwasieden, Lancken-Granitz 1 and Nobbin revealed that the stones were not erected separately from the remaining blocks in the enclosures. Their bases are located at the same height as the other stones in the enclosure and there are or were always links in the shape of dry stone walls, to the other blocks. Although value was placed on especially high guardian stones, in general only glacial erratics were used that had a good surface on which to stand and therefore guaranteed stability. This necessity is demonstrated by the guardian stone of the Dwasieden site, which did not have a good base area for stability and fell over, as the 40 cup marks on its upper surface show.

== Significance ==
The cleared area between the guardian stones of the Nobbin stone enclosure (Hünenbett), down to the bedrock, gave no clues as to the specific use of the place. It is striking that, at the ends of many megalithic sites large quantities of flint flakes were found, that apparently were produced on the spot, because there were piles of them where some of the flakes came from the same source. Such observations were there also at the guardians of Dwasieden and Lancken-Granitz. What is most impressive are the many flakes that on several piles at the stele-like blocks of the enclosure of the expanded dolmen 2 of Serrahn, Neustrelitz county, came to light. They lay together in such a way that their production must have taken place on the spot where they were found, without doubt. Flakes in large numbers were also found on a capstone of the passage grave 1 of Gnewitz, Bad Doberan county. Not one of the flakes has been reworked; they therefore represent the waste from knapping. They are only indirectly linked to the purpose of the guardian stones.

== See also ==
- Nordic megalith architecture
