= Cup and ring mark =

Form of prehistoric art

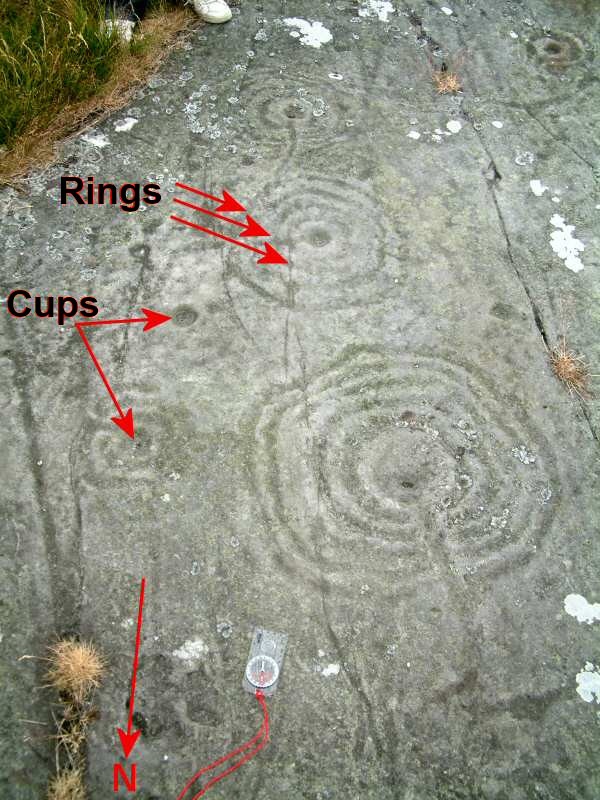
Typical cup and ring marks at Weetwood Moor, in the English county of Northumberland (Google Maps)

Cup and ring marks or cup marks are a form of prehistoric art found on the Atlantic seaboard of Europe (Ireland, Wales, Northern England, Scotland, France (Brittany), Portugal, and Spain (Galicia); and in Mediterranean Europe, Italy (in Alpine valleys and Sardinia) and Greece (Irakleia (Cyclades)).

Similar forms are also found throughout the world including Australia, Azerbaijan, Gabon, Greece, Hawaii, India (Daraki-Chattan and Dwarahat), Israel, Mexico, Mozambique and the Americas. The oldest known forms are found from the Fertile Crescent to India.

They consist of a concave depression, no more than a few centimetres across, pecked into a rock surface and often surrounded by concentric circles also etched into the stone. Sometimes a linear channel called a gutter leads out from the middle. The decoration occurs as a petroglyph on natural boulders and outcrops and also as an element of megalithic art on purposely worked megaliths such as the slab cists of the Food Vessel culture, some stone circles and passage graves such as the clava tombs and on the capstones at Newgrange.

== Levant ==
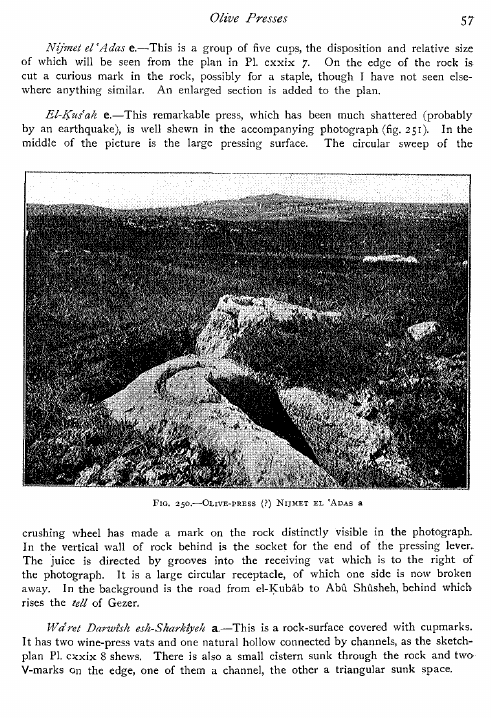
"...and on a projecting boss of rock close by is the only "cup and ring" mark I have seen in Palestine."

The site of Atlit Yam, abandoned circa 6300 BCE and now under Israel's Mediterranean Sea coast south of Haifa, features cup marks engraved into megalithic stones, some of which are set upright to form a semi-circle which has been referred to as resembling the UK's Stonehenge but smaller, with ceremonially buried bodies at the site, and potential alignments to the solstice, and/or to other stars, still being hypothesized as the site was only discovered in 2009 and undersea sites are difficult and expensive to explore. Further inland, dating to at least 3000 BCE (exposed) and estimated up to 4000 BCE (unexcavated layer, under the layer which is exposed), is Rujm el-Hiri, a cairn (tumulus) type of megalith, consisting of concentric circles (as cup marks also are concentric circles, but much smaller than Rogem Hiri) estimated to contain 40,000,000 kg of stones moved by humans, with an opening in the outer circle which aligns to the summer solstice (just as sites throughout Eurasia also align to solstices) and which has a burial chamber in the center, with thousands of dolmens nearby, a "dolmen" being a 3rd and younger type of megalith found elsewhere in Eurasia, the oldest of which, thus far, are found in the UK, but date only to the 3rd millennium BCE in Israel.

The cup marks are still present in other proto-Canaanite sites as recently as the Chalcolithic Age, for example at several sites in and around modern-day Modiin dated to the fourth millennium BCE and the third millennium BCE, and in the City of David, Old Jerusalem. Tel Gezer has more up-ended megaliths dating to only 1550 BCE which are aligned to Earth's north and south physical poles, but Tel Gezer's cupmarks have only recently been surveyed (2012) and do not appear to have been dated (as to whether they were made before, concurrent to or after the 1550 BCE megaliths) yet; however, excavations at Gezer are ongoing as of 2014.

== Italy ==
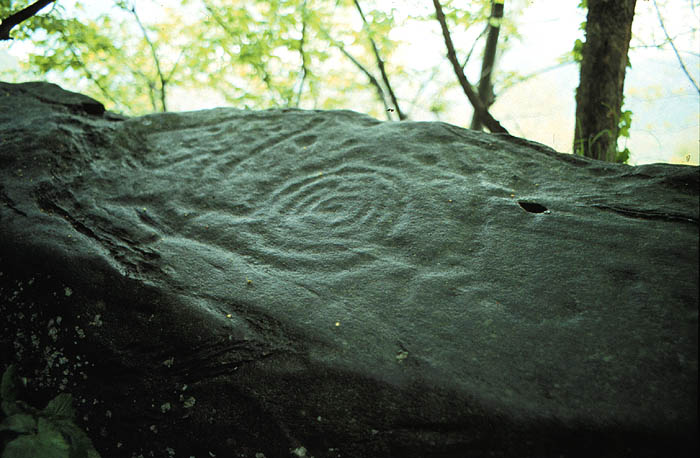
Novalesa cup-and-rings stone Italy

Numerous cup-marked stones have been found in the alpine valleys, comprising Val Camonica (Italy), associated with rock drawings. Regarding western alps (Piedmont), the best known are distributed along the Chisone, Susa and Viù valleys; also the La Bessa site is to be cited. Strictly referring to cup-and-rings, it is possible to cite in the western Alps only the Novalesa stone, in the Cenischia Valley, near the Italian-French border. Found in 1988, it shows 4 concentric circles, with a central cup-mark, all around a network of 20 cup-marks and channels.

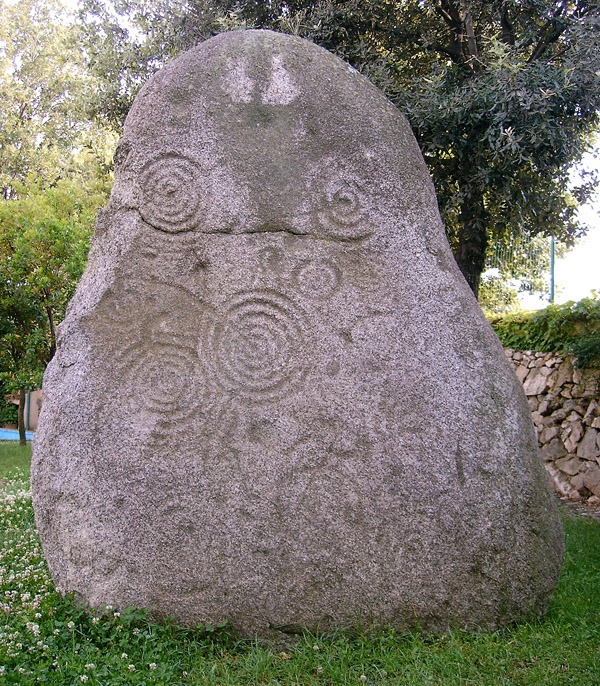
Sardinia mamoiada perda pinta

Sardinia is rich in cup-and-rings stones. The best known is the Perda Pintà (the 'painted stone', which is carved, not painted) or Stele di Boeli, at Mamoiada: an impressive stele or menhir 2.67 metres (8 ft 9 in) high with various concentric circles patterns crossed by engraved channels and central cup-marks.

== Spain ==
Similar patterns are known in Galicia, which has given them the name of 'Galician style'. These types, the cup-and-ring, cup-and-ring with gutter and the gapped concentric circles motifs are shared between this part of Iberia and the British Isles, manifesting, together with other cultural expressions like megaliths or Bronze Age culture, a cultural link along the coasts of Atlantic Europe.

== United Kingdom ==
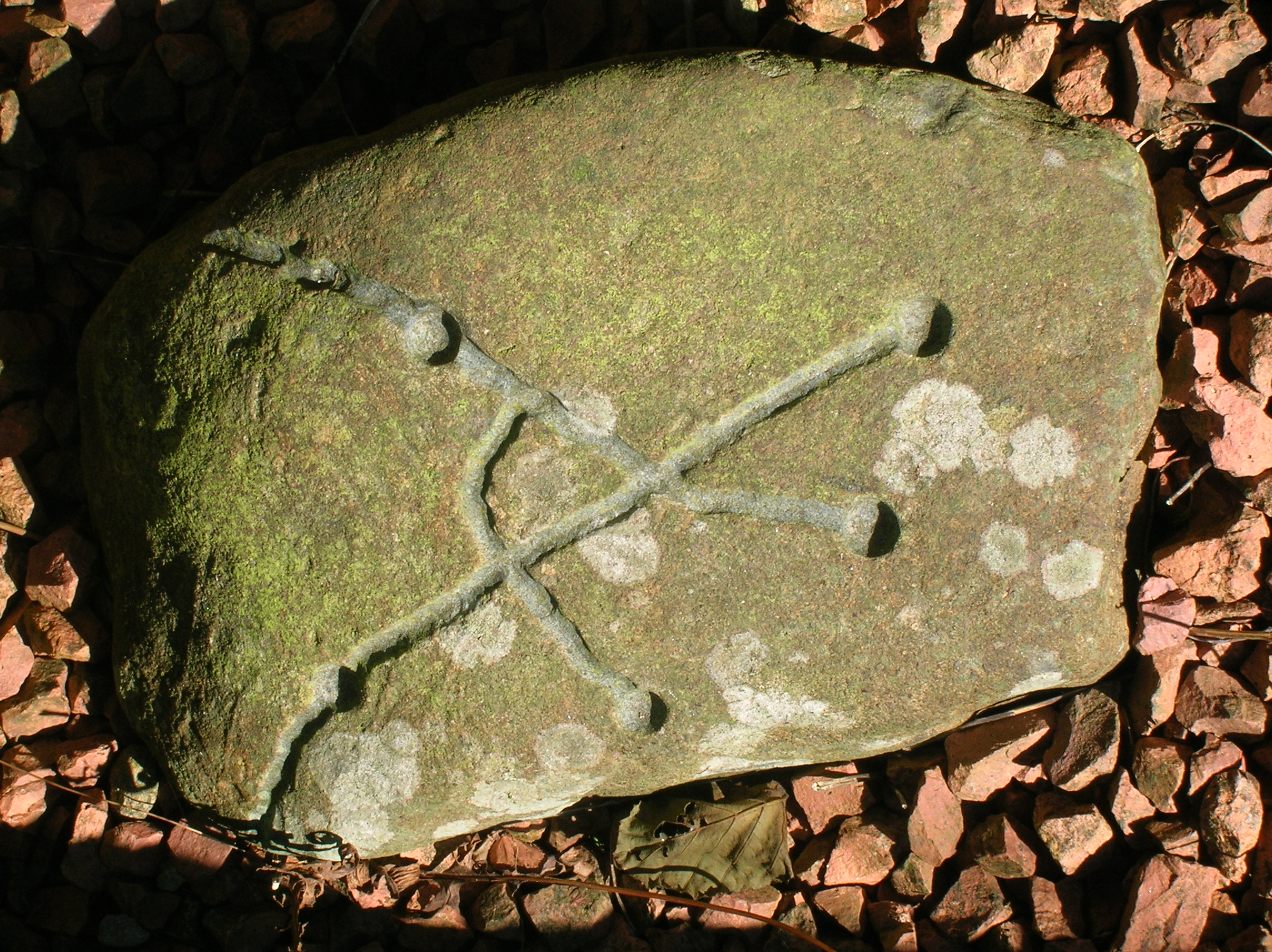
A replica of an unusual cup-and-ring-marked stone from Museum of Ayrshire Country Life and Costume, Dalgarven, North Ayrshire, Scotland

Precisely dating megalithic art is difficult: even if the megalithic monument can be dated, the art may be a later addition. The Hunterheugh Crags cup and ring marks near Alnwick in Northumberland have recently been demonstrated to date back into the Early Neolithic era through their stratigraphic relationship with other, datable features. Some cup marks have been found in Iron Age contexts but these may represent re-used stones.

Where they are etched onto natural, flat stone it has been observed that they seem to incorporate the natural surface of the rock. Those at Hunterheugh are mostly connected to one another by gutters that can channel rainwater from one to the next, down the sloping top of the stone. It has been suggested by archaeologist Clive Waddington that the initial Early Neolithic impetus to create the marks was forgotten and that the practice fell into abeyance until a second phase of creation continued the basic tradition but with less precision and more variability in design. The markers of this second phase moved the art from natural stones to megaliths as its symbolism was reinterpreted by Later Neolithic and Early Bronze Age people.

Their purpose is unknown although some may be connected with natural stone outcrops exploited by Neolithic peoples to make polished stone axes. A religious purpose has been suggested. Alexander Thom suggested in a BBC television documentary, Cracking the Stone Age Code, in 1970, "I have an idea, entirely nebulous at the moment, that the cup and ring markings were a method of recording, of writing, and that they may indicate, once we can read them, what a particular stone was for. We have seen the cup and ring markings on the stone at Temple Wood, and that's on the main stone but we can't interpret them ...yet." He created diagrams and carried out analysis of over 50 of the cup and ring markings from which he determined a length he termed the Megalithic Inch (MI).

This whole idea has been ignored almost completely apart from a critical analysis carried out by Alan Davis in the 1980s, who tested Thom's hypothesis on cup and ring sites in England by examining the separations of neighbouring cupmark centres. He found some weak evidence for the "Megalithic Inch" but it was not statistically significant, and he suggested "strongest indications...towards the use of a quantum close in value to 5 MI at certain sites" and that "the apparent quantum seems strongly associated with ringed cups." Davis made an initial effort to build on Thom's start, and to answer the question he posed: "Why should a man spend hours – or rather days – cutting cups in a random fashion on a rock? It would indeed be a breakthrough if someone could crack the code of the cups."

Subsequently, Davis investigated the idea that the prehistoric carvers used an elementary method of diameter-construction in laying out the carvings. This investigation (incorporating both Scottish and English sites) suggested a possible explanation for many of the characteristic shapes of carved rings, and also produced evidence in the ring diameters for the use of a unit of measurement close to Thom's MI (and 5 MI) that was of high statistical significance. The evidence is consistent with the use of rough measures such as hand- and finger-widths (rather than the formal, accurate system proposed by Thom), but the important conclusion is that a similar design ritual, apparently involving a consistent measurement system of some kind, was in use over a wide geographical area.

=== Sites ===
Sites with cup and ring marks include:

- Ecclesall Woods, Sheffield, South Yorkshire
- Baildon Moor, Bradford, West Yorkshire
- Chatton Sandyford rock overhang and Fowberry petroglyphs in Northumberland
- Rombalds Moor including Ilkley Moor
- Gardom's Edge in Derbyshire
- Bachwen portal dolmen in Gwynedd
- Anderton, Lancashire
- Dalladies long barrow, Kincardineshire
- Street House cairn in Cleveland
- Dalgarven Mill, North Ayrshire
- Ballochmyle cup and ring marks, Mauchline, East Ayrshire
- Brodick, Isle of Arran
- Blackshaw Hill, North Ayrshire
- Kilmartin Glen, Argyll
- Tomnaverie stone circle, Aberdeenshire
- Castleton farm cup and ring markings
- Balblair, Beauly, nr. Inverness
- Tongue Croft, near Borgue, Dumfries and Galloway
- Kilpatrick Hills, Strathclyde
- Cochno Stone, Kilpatrick Hills, West Dunbartonshire
- Clava cairn, Culloden
- Craigmaddie Muir by the Auld Wives Lifts near Milngavie
- Reyfad Stones (Reyfad), Boho, County Fermanagh
- Eston Hills, Cleveland
- Weetwood Moor, Northumberland
- Lordenshaws, Northumberland
- Long Meg and Her Daughters, Cumbria
- Great Langdale, Cumbria
- Grasmere, Cumbria
- Dun Borve, Isle of Harris, Western Isles
- Juniper Green, Edinburgh, Scotland
- Simonside, Rothbury, Northumberland
- Castleton cup and ring marks, Stirlingshire

== Ireland ==
Work at Drumirril in County Monaghan has uncovered Neolithic and early Bronze Age occupation evidence around the rock carvings there and this dating is generally accepted for most of the art. Another particularly rich source of cup-marked boulders is the Derrynablaha townland on the Iveragh peninsula in County Kerry.

== Switzerland (Grisons) ==
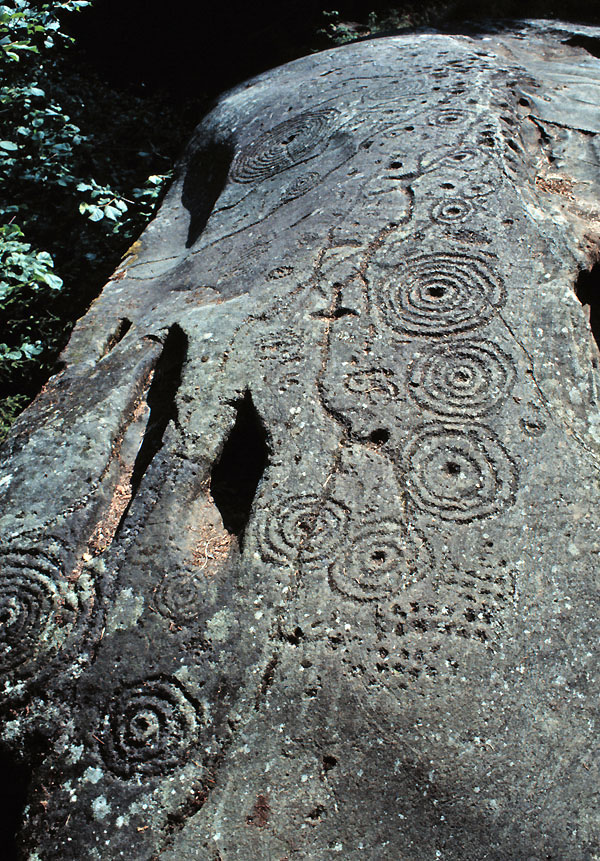
Switzerland Carschenna concentric circles and cupmarks

An open air rock art site in the Swiss Alps is situated at Carschenna, Rethic Alps (in Grisons, Switzerland), where Latin derived languages mingle with German. The first engraved rocks were discovered in 1965, during the building of an iron electricity framework. Carschenna engravings are mainly characterized by cup-marks with from 1 to 9 concentric circles. Spirals, sun-like figures, riding scenes, and schematic horses are also present.

== Gallery ==
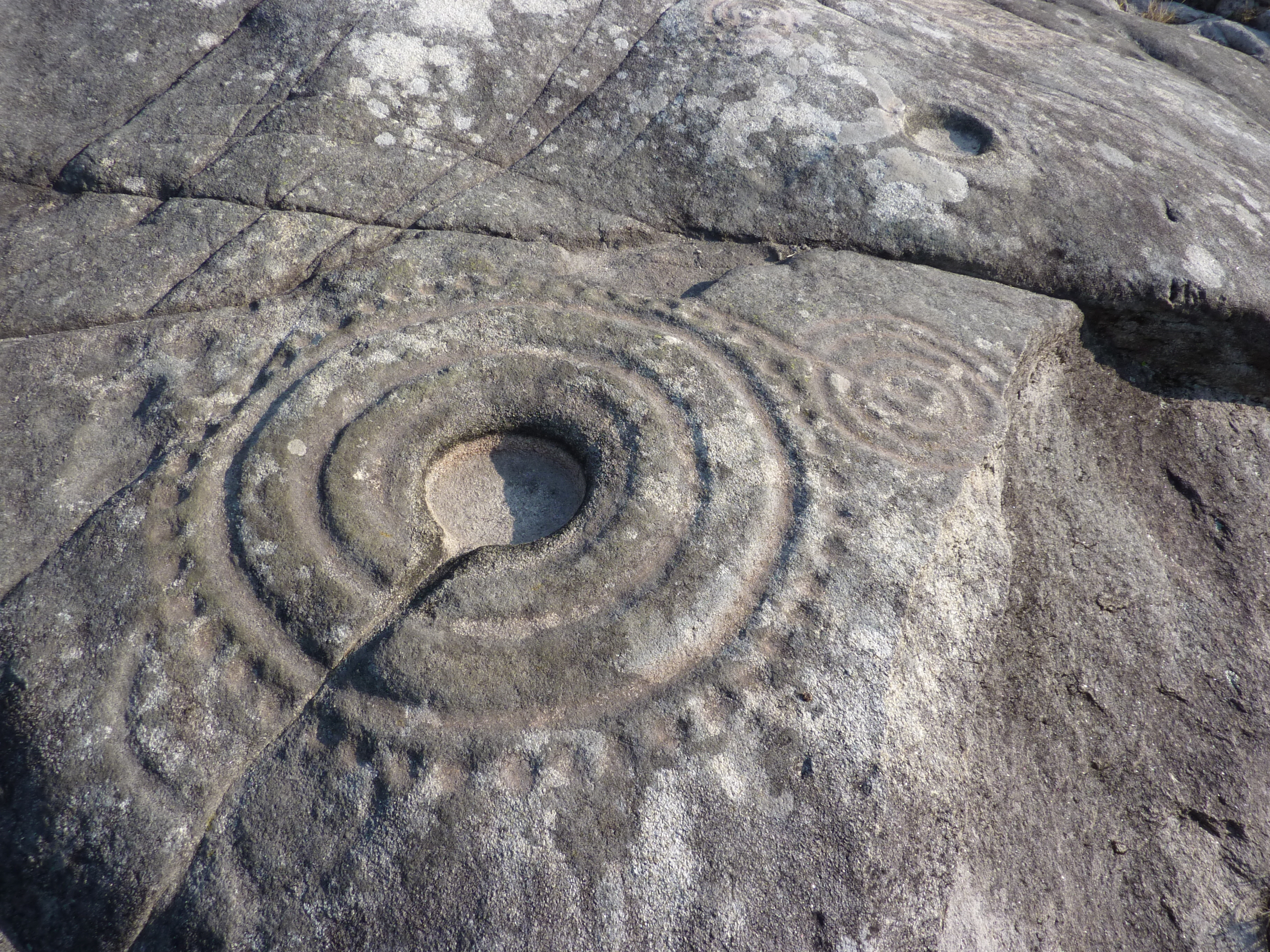
Galicia, where hundreds of stations are known

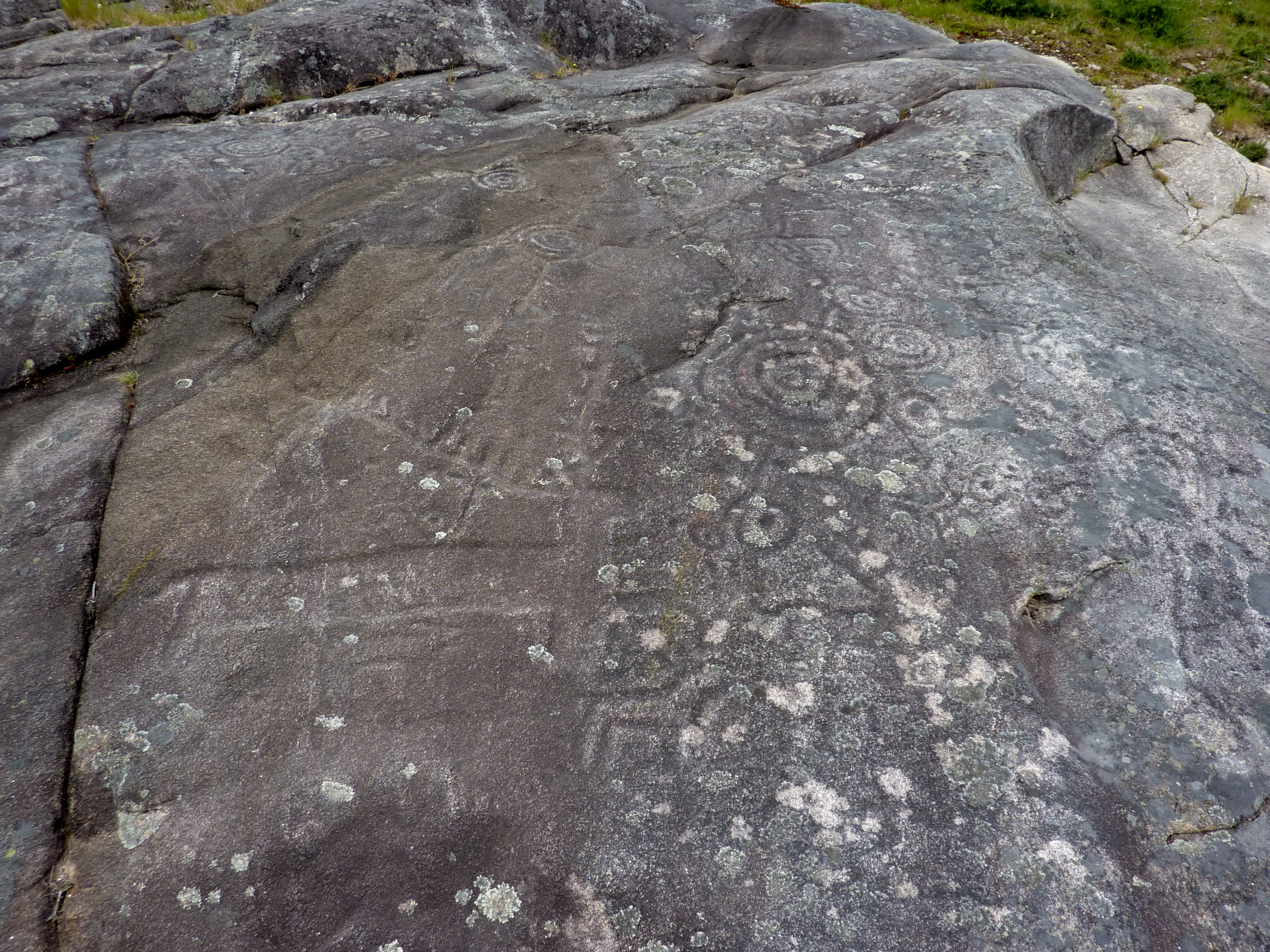
Deer and cup-and-ring motifs, Tourón, Ponte Caldelas, Galicia

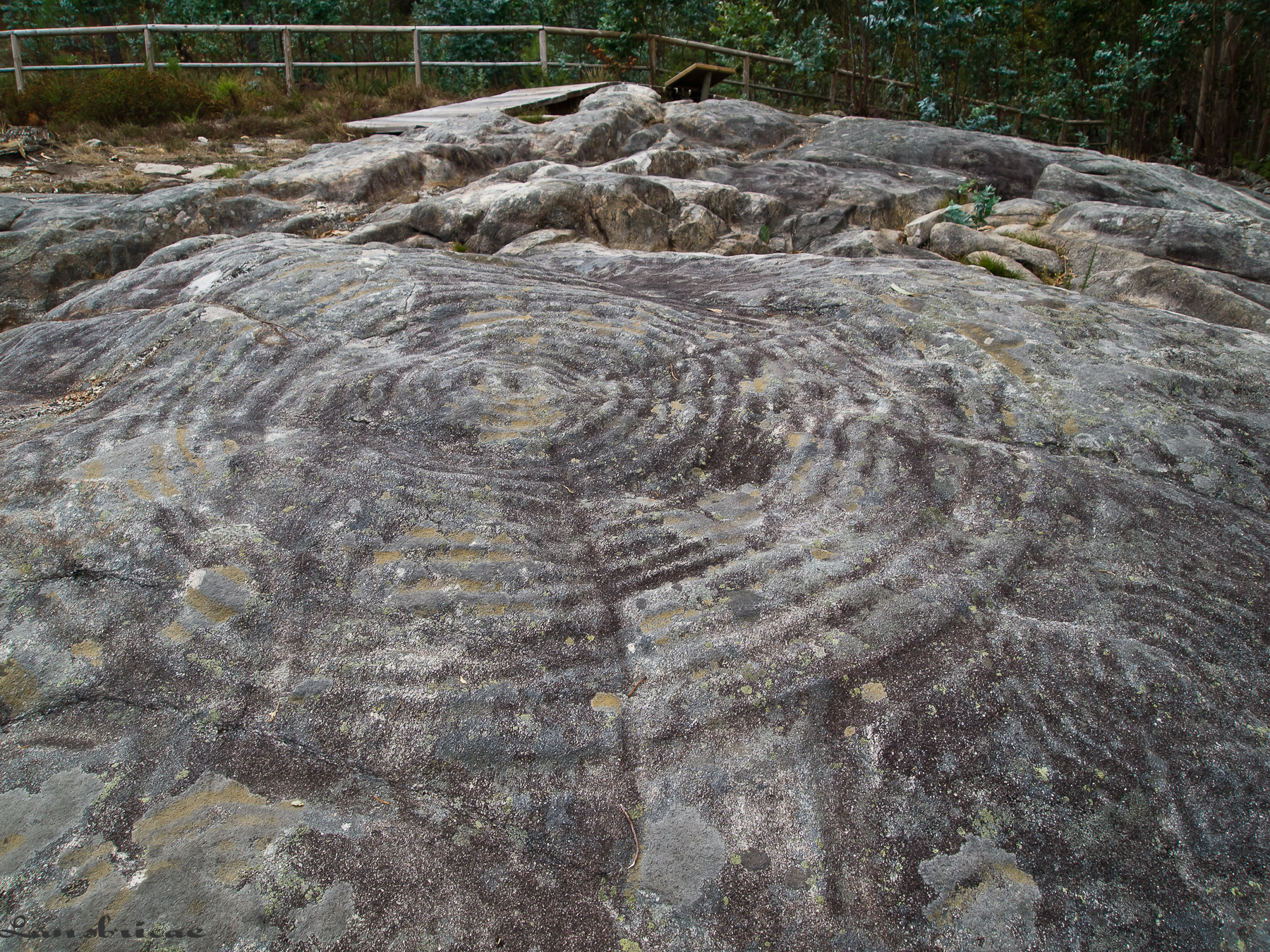
Cup-and-ring mark at Monte Tetón, Tomiño, the largest one in Galicia

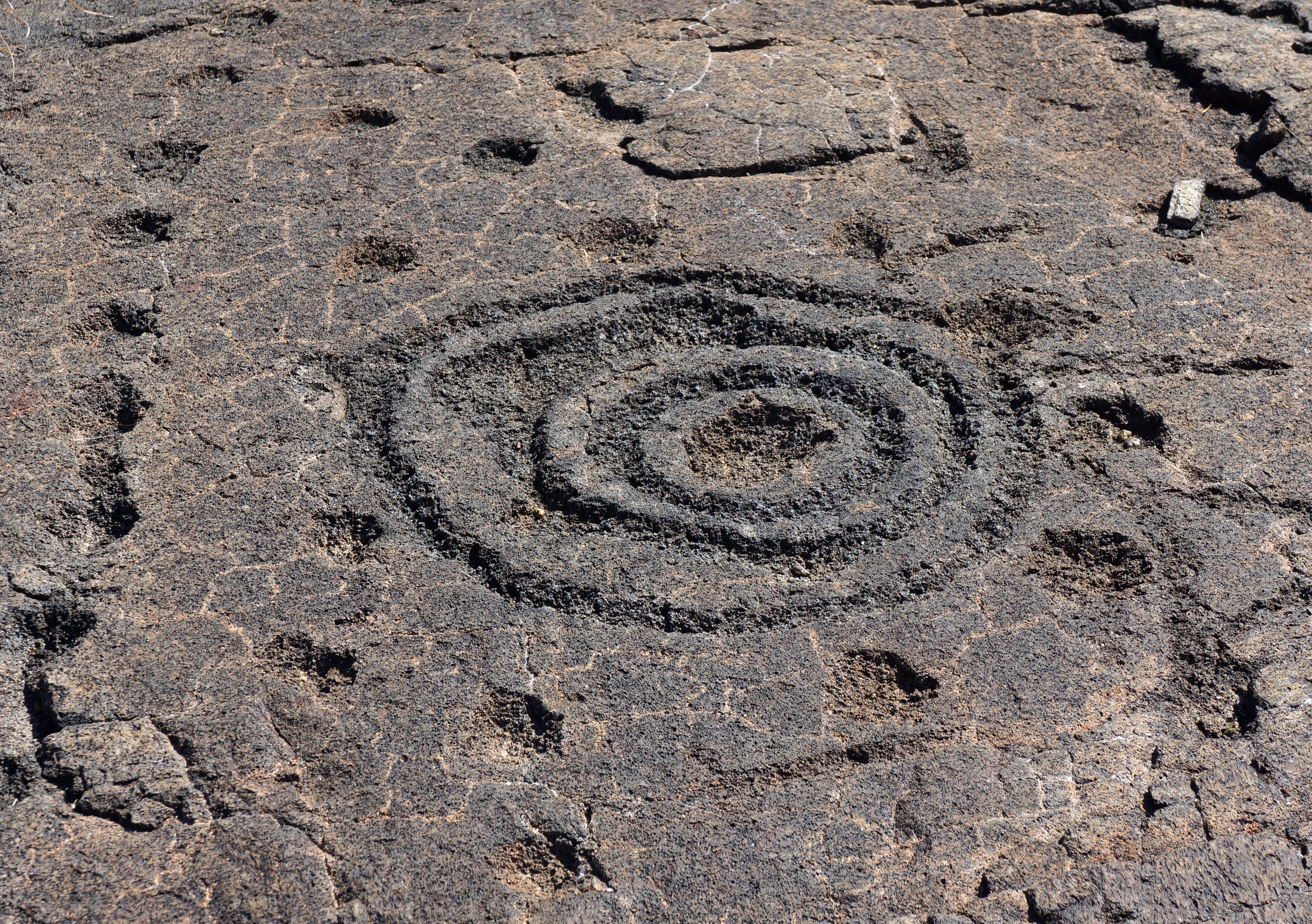
Cup and ring petroglyph in lava rock, island of Hawaii, US

== See also ==
- Bullaun
- Cup marked stones
- Cupstones
- Goldbusch
- Great dolmen of Dwasieden
- Dalgarven Mill
- European Megalithic Culture
- Petroglyph
- Petrosomatoglyph
- Prehistoric art
- Rock Drawings in Valcamonica
