= Great dolmen =

Type of dolmen in Nordic megalith architecture

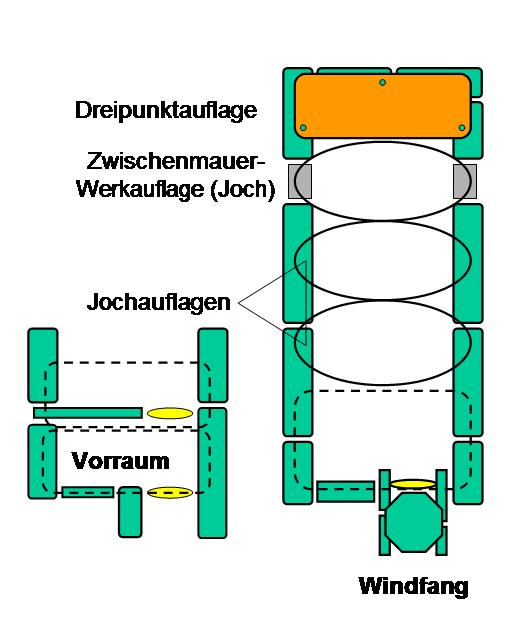
Great dolmen construction features. Key: Dreipunktauflage = 3-point support, Zwischenmauerwerkauflage = pier support, Jochauflagen = bay supports or trilithons, Vorraum = antechamber or forecourt, Windfang = porch

The great dolmen or grand dolmen (German: Großdolmen, Danish: Stordysse) is a type of megalithic site of the Funnelbeaker culture (TBK) that occurs in Nordic megalith architecture, primarily in the east of what is now German Mecklenburg-Vorpommern, and which has two different types of entrance. Neolithic monuments are features of the culture and ideology of Neolithic communities. Their evolution and function act as indicators of social development. The type of site, called Stordysse in Danish, does not follow the criteria listed below. In Germany, dolmens with three or more capstones are described as great dolmens and are divided into:

- Great dolmens with an antechamber (Vorraum)
- Great dolmens with a porch (Windfang)

The porch dolmen is mainly found on the island of Rügen and on the mainland opposite the island. The antechamber dolmen is found southeast of that, between Demmin and the island of Usedom. Several variant, but very rare examples recall the extended or polygonal dolmen types. In Mecklenburg there are 146 great dolmens, of which Ewald Schuldt has investigated 44. There are also two great dolmens in Schleswig-Holstein (Wees, Flensburg county and in Nebel auf Amrum), several in western Lower Saxony, but quite a few in Saxony-Anhalt (e.g. Lüdelsen 3).

Since the width of northern megalith sites is limited due to the source material used, the main design aim of their longitudinal extension was an effort to increase the size of the chambers. Great dolmens reach an average interior size of 14 cubic metres, a scale only otherwise matched by that of the gallery and passage grave. Great dolmens have up to five capstones lying on eight to twelve supporting stones. Several great dolmens were extended using wide piers (Zwischenmauerwerk), on which, in certain cases, even capstones may have been placed.

Like passage graves, great dolmens are a type of layout, in which the centre capstones were sometimes placed in a bay configuration (Jochbauweise, see picture). Whilst, initially, the roof was only built in such a way that its structural stability was based on a three-point support, in the later bay designs, a capstone could be supported on just two uprights (forming a single bay), the three stones being built as one unit, like a trilithon.

The 44 great dolmens that have been investigated were found in various configurations. Five were surrounded by rectangular and 8 by trapezoidal frames of standing stones; 4 were buried under circular mounds, but the majority, 26, were under mounds covered by boulders. In one case, the type of mound was not known because it had been removed. The trapezoidally-framed dolmens (e.g. Dwasieden, Lancken-Granitz I, Kruckow, Nadelitz, Pöglitz, Poggedorf Forest) have guardian stones, sometimes at both ends. The great dolmen of Gaarzerhof, which initially lay within a very short rectangular frame, was eventually covered with a circular mound.

== See also ==
- Nordic megalith architecture
- Great dolmen of Dwasieden

== Literature ==
- Deutsches Archäologisches Institut – Abteilung Madrid: Probleme der Megalithgräberforschung. Vorträge zum 100. Geburtstag von Vera Leisner. New York : de Gruyter Berlin u. a. 1990, ISBN 3-11-011966-8 (Madrider Forschungen 16).
- Michael Schmidt: Die alten Steine. Reisen zur Megalithkultur in Mitteleuropa. Hinstorff, Rostock 1998, ISBN 3-356-00796-3.
- Ewald Schuldt: Die mecklenburgischen Megalithgräber. Untersuchungen zu ihrer Architektur und Funktion. Deutscher Verlag der Wissenschaften, Berlin 1972 (Beiträge zur Ur- und Frühgeschichte der Bezirke Rostock, Schwerin und Neubrandenburg. 6, ISSN 0138-4279).
- Jürgen E. Walkowitz: Das Megalithsyndrom. Europäische Kultplätze der Steinzeit. Beier & Beran, Langenweißbach 2003, ISBN 3-930036-70-3 (Beiträge zur Ur- und Frühgeschichte Mitteleuropas. 36).
