= Ewald Schuldt =

German prehistorian (1914–1987)

Ewald Adolf Ludwig Wilhelm Schuldt (3 January 1914 – 1 June 1987) was a German prehistorian who carried out significant research into the megaliths of northern Germany.

== Life ==
=== Early years ===
Schuldt was born on 3 January 1914 in Mechelsdorf near Rerik and grew up as an only child in simple circumstances. He never got to know his father, an agricultural labourer, because he was killed in 1914 as a soldier in France. The second husband of hs mother was to him an understanding stepfather, who initially wanted to Ewald Schuldt to follow him as a gardener.

== Significance ==
Ewald Schuldt conducted research in the field of prehistory and early history. His scientific work built on the research begun in 1835 by G.C.F. Lisch, and continued from 1880 to 1942 by Robert Beltz. The focus of his scientific work was on excavations of megalithic tombs, the grave sites of the Neolithic farming peoples around the middle of the 3rd century B.C. and on the excavations of Slavic archaeological sites (600 to 1,200 A.D.). Excavations from this time gave him insights into the social, economic and cultural life of the ancient Slavs. By 1945 almost nothing was known about them in Mecklenburg; his achievement is that our knowledge of this field increased many times over. Particularly noteworthy is his extensive bibliography as well as his numerous awards.

== Death ==
Schuldt died on 1 June 1987 in Schwerin.

== Honours ==
- Member of the (International Council of Museums) and the Permanent Council of the Union Internationale des Sciences Préhistoriques et Protohistorique
- Member of the advisory board for Soil Conservation in the Ministry of Trade and Higher Education, the Council of Ancient History and Archaeology at the Academy of Sciences, Council for Museum Affairs and the National Museum Council of the GDR
- Patriotic Order of Merit
- Star of People's Friendship
- National Prize of East Germany

== Works ==
- Der eintausendjährige Tempelort Gross Raden. Museum für Ur- und Frühgeschichte, Schwerin, 1987.
- 25 Jahre Museum für Ur- und Frühgeschichte Schwerin. Museum für Ur- und Frühgeschichte, Schwerin, 1977.
- Die mecklenburgischen Megalithgräber. Deutscher Verlag der Wissenschaft, Berlin, 1972.
- Mecklenburg – urgeschichtlich. Petermänken, Schwerin, 1954.

== See also ==
- Nordic megalith architecture
- Types of Mecklenburg megalithic tomb

== Literature ==
- Gabriele Baumgartner, Dieter Hebig (eds.): Biographisches Handbuch der SBZ/DDR. 1945–1990. Vol. 2: Maaßen – Zylla. Nachtrag zu Band 1. Saur, Munich and others, 1997, ISBN 3-598-11177-0.
- Klaus-Dieter Gralow (ed.): Ewald Schuldt. Archäologische Expeditionen im eigenen Land (1950–1984). Stock & Stein, Schwerin, 2005, ISBN 3-937447-14-8.
- Klaus-Dieter Gralow: Sein Grundprinzip: nahezu ständige Anwesenheit auf Ausgrabungen. Der Archäologe Prof. Dr. Ewald Schuldt. In: Mecklenburg. Vol. 46, No. 9, 2004, ISSN 0177-8625, p. 14–15.
- Horst Keiling: Ewald Schuldt: Ein schwerer Anfang. In Mecklenburg. Vol. 43, No. 4, 2001, pp. 17–18.
- Horst Keiling: Ewald Schuldt zum 65. Geburtstag. In Ethnographisch-archäologische Zeitschrift. Vol. 20, No. 1, 1979, ISSN 0012-7477, pp. 133–135.
- Horst Keiling: Ewald Schuldt zum Gedenken. In Schweriner Blätter. Vol. 8, 1988, ISSN 0232-7902, pp. 95–97.
- Horst Keiling: Steinzeitgräber und Slawenburgen. Zur Erinnerung an Prof. Dr. Ewald Schuldt. In Heimathefte für Mecklenburg und Vorpommern. Vol. 14, No. 2, 2004, ISSN 0948-1265, pp. 4–7.
- Lothar Mertens: Das Lexikon der DDR-Historiker. Saur, Munich, 2006, ISBN 3-598-11673-X.
- Rolf Seiffert: Der Mann, der Mecklenburg ausgrub: Prof. Dr. Ewald Schuldt (3 January 1914 – 1 June 1987). In: Mecklenburg-Magazin. No. 14, 1990, ZDB-ID 1084691-8, pp. 1–2.
