= Ernst Sprockhoff =

German prehistorian

Ernst Sprockhoff (6 August 1892 – 1 October 1967) was a German prehistorian and inventor of the Sprockhoff numbering system for megalithic monuments in Germany.

== Life ==
Sprockhoff was born on 6 August 1892 in Berlin. He started as a teacher before the first World War. After the war he completed his abitur during his captivity as a prisoner of war and in 1920 started to study prehistory at Friedrich-Wilhelm University in Berlin. He was graduated in 1924 by Max Ebert at the University of Königsberg. From 1926 to 1928 he was employed at the Provincial Museum of Hanover and from 1928 to 1935 at the Römisch-Germanisches Zentralmuseum in Mainz. In 1922 Sprockhoff became a member of the Reichsbund für Deutsche Vorgeschichte, in 1931 an associate member and in 1934 a full member of the German Archaeological Institute. In 1935 he succeeded Gerhard Bersu, who was forced by the Nazi Government to resign his post, as head of the Römisch-Germanische Kommission (Romano-Germanic Commission, RGK) in Frankfurt, initially as second director later to be promoted first director in 1937. He held the position until 1945. In 1942 he joined the Bayerischen Akademie der Wissenschaften as a corresponding member.

Sprockhoff became a member of Der Stahlhelm in 1920 but left it in 1923. That he continued to identify as a right winged extremist is proven by him joining the SA in 1933, the year of the Machtergreifung by the Nazis. In the same year he became a member of the National Socialist Teachers League and in 1937 after the freeze on admissions also of the Nazi Party.

As Oberstleutnant of an artillery regiment he was the commander of the German coastal fortifications between Karmøy und Vanse during the occupation of Norway from 1943 to 1945. While building a coastal fort at the southwestern coast of the Marka peninsula for the Atlantic Wall some of his soldiers dug into the Grønhaug, a large viking age tumulus 3 km southeast of Vestbygd. Sprockhoff joined in, excavated the double inhumation at the center of the mound and handed the finds over to the University Museum at Oslo, now Museum of Cultural History (Kulturhistorisk museum, KHM). But two other large tumuli on Marka, Engelshaug and Tuptehaug, two of the largest prehistoric monuments of Norway, were destroyed without any investigation during those same fortification activities. During that time he even wrote a book about Norwegian prehistory, mainly using sources from the area of his command. The book titled "...Und zeugen von einem stolzen Geschlecht" [...Bear witness to a proud race] was published in 1945 by the SS-Ahnenerbe. After the capitulation of the Wehrmacht in Norway on May 8, 1945, Sprockhoff was arrested and kept as a prisoner of war by the British for over two years.

Directly after his return to Germany in autumn 1947 he was appointed full professor of European Pre- and Early History at the University of Kiel and held the post until his retirement in 1958. In his later years he was a highly valued member of the German scientific community demonstrated by his 1955 election to the Deutsche Akademie der Wissenschaften (German Academy of Sciences). In his obituary in 1968 professor Joachim Werner wrote:

Ernst Sprockhoff war ein ganzer Mann und ein bedeutender Gelehrter, von gleicher Zuverlässigkeit in seiner wissenschaftlichen Arbeit wie gegenüber seinen Mitmenschen. [Ernst Sprockhoff was a real man and an important scholar, as reliable in his scientific work as towards his fellow human beings]

— Joachim Werner, Ernst Sprockhoff 6. 8. 1892 - 1. 10. 1967

He died in Kiel on 1 October 1967.

== Sprockhoff numbers ==
Sprockhoff recorded about 900 German megalith structures in a sequentially numbered catalogue. The so-called Sprockhoff number (Sprockhoff No. or Sprockhoff-Nr.) is still used to refer to these sites today.

== Publications ==
- Atlas der Megalithgräber. Teil 1-3, Rudolf Habelt Verlag, Bonn, 1966-1975
- Die nordische Megalithkultur. Handbuch der Urgeschichte Deutschlands Band 3, Berlin und Leipzig : W. de Gruyter & Co., 1938
- Die germanischen Vollgriffschwerter der jüngeren Bronzezeit, Römisch-Germanische Forschungen 9, Berlin – Leipzig, 1934.
- Jungbronzezeitliche Hortfunde Norddeutschlands (Periode IV), Mainz, 1937.
- "... und zeugen von einem stolzen Geschlecht". Herausgeben vom Reichskommissar f. d. besetzten norw. Gebiete, Germanische Leitstelle Norwegen, Germanischer Wissenschaftseinsatz, Oslo 1945.
- Jungbronzezeitliche Hortfunde der Südzone des nordischen Kreises (Periode V), Vo,. I – II, Mainz, 1956.

== Literature ==
- Kurt Böhner: Zur Erinnerung an Ernst Sprockhoff, in: Jahrbuch des Römisch- Germanischen Zentralmuseums 14 (1967) p. IX-XXVIII.
- Ernst Klee: Das Kulturlexikon zum Dritten Reich. Wer war was vor und nach 1945. S. Fischer, Frankfurt am Main, 2007, p. 581.
- C. Misamer: Ernst Sprockhoff, in: Studien zum Kulturbegriff in der Vor- und Frühgeschichtforschung. Bonn, 1987, pp. 87–99.
- Wolfgang Pape: Zehn Prähistoriker aus Deutschland. In: Heiko Steuer (ed.): Eine hervorragend nationale Wissenschaft. Ergänzungsbände zum Reallexikon der Germanischen Altertumskunde Vol. 29. de Gruyter, Berlin, 2001. ISBN 3-11-017184-8. pp. 55–88.
- Friedrich Wagner: Ernst Sprockhoff, 6. August 1892-1. Oktober 1967, in: Bayerische Akademie der Wissenschaften. Jahrbuch (1968) pp. 192–200.
- Karl-Heinz Willroth: Ernst Sprockhoff und die nordische Bronzezeit. In: Heiko Steuer (ed.): Eine hervorragend nationale Wissenschaft. Ergänzungsbände zum Reallexikon der Germanischen Altertumskunde Vol. 29. de Gruyter, Berlin, 2001. ISBN 3-11-017184-8. pp. 109–149.
