= Long Burgh Long Barrow =

Long barrow in East Sussex, England

Coordinates: 50.8105°N 0.1422°E

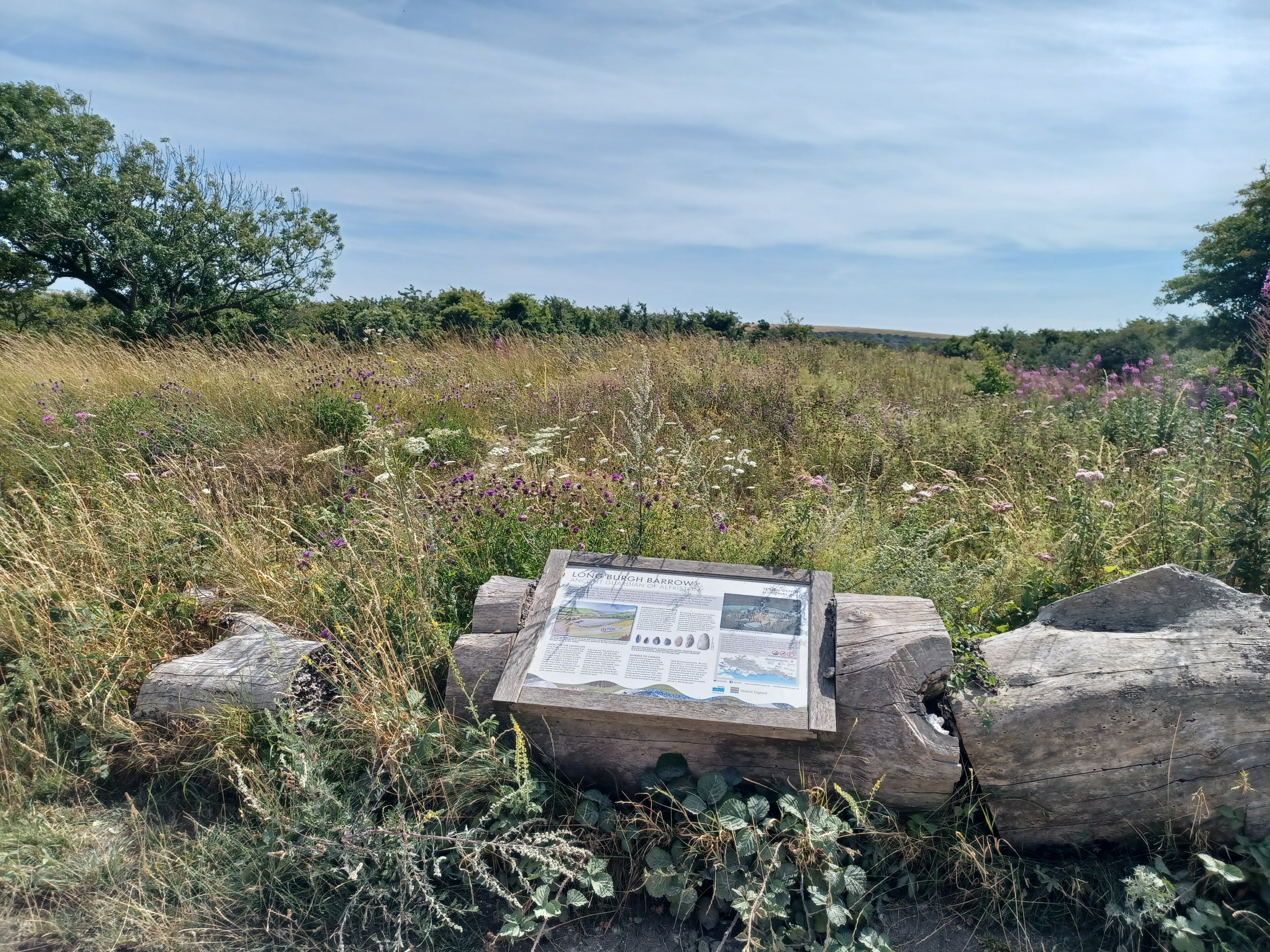
Information placard and overgrown grass

Long Burgh Long Barrow, is an unchambered long barrow located near to the village of Alfriston in the south-eastern English county of East Sussex. Probably constructed in the fourth millennium BCE, during Britain's Early Neolithic period, today it survives only in a state of ruin.

Archaeologists have established that the monument was built by pastoralist communities shortly after the introduction of agriculture to Britain from continental Europe. Although representing part of an architectural tradition of long barrow building that was widespread across Neolithic Europe, the Long Burgh Long Barrow belongs to a localised regional variant of barrows produced on the chalk downlands of Sussex.

== Context ==
There are at least ten recorded long barrows in Sussex.

== Description ==
The Long Burgh Long Barrow is 180 feet in length and aligned on a northeast to southwest axis.

A second long barrow at Alfriston is 90 feet in length and is aligned on a south/southeast to north/northwest axis.
