= British megalith architecture =

Study of those ancient cultures that built megalithic sites on the British Isles

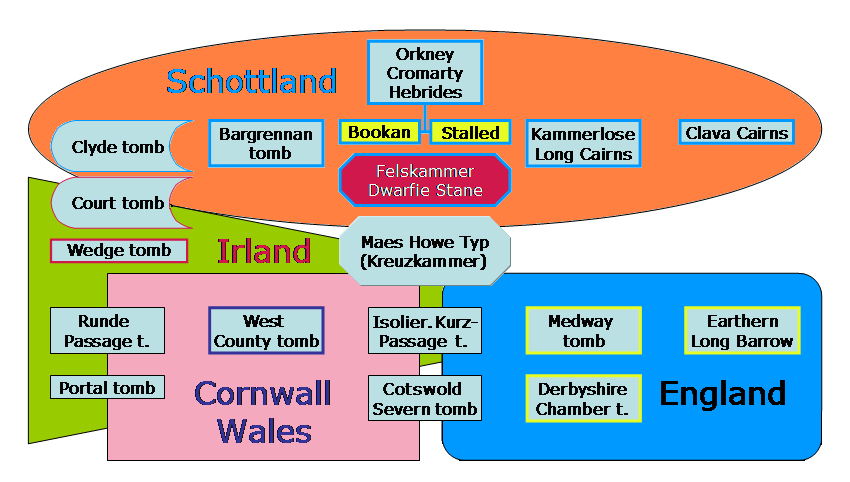
The palette of megalithic architecture on the British Isles

British megalith architecture is the study of those ancient cultures that built megalithic sites on the British Isles, including the research and documentation of these sites. The classification sometimes used of these cultures based on geological criteria is problematic.

The Neolithic sites of Britain are amongst the most varied in the prehistory of Europe. Although (geologically) different from "megalithic" sites, the earthen long barrows in East England are grouped with them from a cultural historical perspective. The Medway tombs and the Derbyshire chamber tombs (Five Wells) occupy a special position as examples of megalithic sites in East England. The north–south boundary between earthen sites and stone sites in England and Scotland is crossed at three points to the east by the seven different types of megalith site types (in the so-called mixed regions).

The activities of megalithic cultures in the region dates back to prehistoric times. There are many parallels between the prehistoric architecture of Ireland and the now British regions of Cornwall (including the Isles of Scilly), the Isle of Man, Wales and Scotland; but there are somewhat greater differences between those and the sites in England and, particularly, the Channel Islands. Although almost all regions have endemic megalith types, but they also usually have unique examples (e.g. the chamber tomb of Glyn) as well as forms that they share with one or two neighbouring regions.

Exemplary in this respect are the "cruciform passage" sites of the Maes Howe type in Orkney (in Ireland e.g. Knowth and Newgrange), whose distribution extends as far as the Scilly Isles and Devonshire in England. In addition to the great wealth of variety in Scotland, favoured by its geography, there are also sites on the Scottish islands with individual characteristics.

Neolithic monuments are an expression of the culture and ideology of Neolithic societies. Their origin and function are considered characteristic of social development.

== Dating ==
Well dated monuments, such as Street House in North Yorkshire and Hazleton North in Gloucestershire, indicate that the primary period of use, during which there were continual burials, perhaps lasted only two or three centuries. The small number of burials found in the West Kennet Long Barrow in Wiltshire seems to confirm this.

On the other hand, the Middle Neolithic pottery in the trenches of long barrows and the late dates of the hearths (Herde) on the forecourts of megalithic sites such as Monamore on the Isle of Arran, indicate that the interest of the communities in these monuments was maintained for centuries after the last burial. The construction of cenotaphs like Tulach an t'Sionnaich in Caithness leads to the same conclusion.

Primarily in southern England, burial sites were deliberately closed. The time when this occurred is often uncertain. The chamber of the West Kennet Long Barrow seems to have been used for many centuries, but was eventually filled about 2400 B.C. Blocked access is often found in atria, indicating an end to the chamber's use, but the frequent presence of more than one layer indicates that these decisions were not final, making it difficult to determine the exact time when the tomb was finally abandoned. Particularly in Scotland (up to Shetland - Pettigarth's Field), there are a number of multi-period systems (English multi-period building), whereby round mounds had long barrows subsequently built over them (Grey Cairns of Camster) and heel-shaped cairns).

It is not clear whether any new monuments were erected after about 3000 B.C. in southern England, although rituals continued to be held in the old ones. In the northwest, the old tradition probably lasted longer. The conversion of a classic passage tomb into a henge monument, as in Bryn Celli Ddu on Anglesey, shows that the religious focus was maintained in traditional construction, even if new sites were already being built. Such evidence, however, is not to be found everywhere. The advent of the Late Neolithic individual graves is connected with the appearance of the Bell-Beaker culture and signs of a new attitude in society. In many areas the old ideas end abruptly.

== See also ==
- Ballowall Barrow
- Clava cairn
- Entrance grave Scilly Isles and Ireland
- Heel-shaped cairn
- Medway tomb
- Passage tomb
- Portal tomb
- Quoit
- Ring cairn
- Tor cairn

=== Also included are ===
- Non-megalithic long barrows
- Non-megalithic round barrows
- Unchambered long cairns

== Literature ==
- R. Cavendish Prehistoric England 1983
- B. Cunliffe & A. + G. Ritchie: Oxford Archaeological Guide, Scotland 1998 ISBN 0-19-288002-0
- F. Lynch: Megalithic Tombs and Long Barrows in Britain 1997 ISBN 0-7478-0341-2
- E. Shee Twohig: Irish Megalithic Tombs 1990 ISBN 0-7478-0094-4
- Jürgen E. Walkowitz: Das Megalithsyndrom. europäische Kultstätten der Steinzeit. Beier & Beran, Langenweißbach 2003, ISBN 3-930036-70-3.
