= Dorothy Marshall =

Dorothy Marshall may refer to:

- Dorothy Marshall (chemist)
- Dorothy Marshall (historian)
- Dorothy Marshall (archaeologist)
- Dorothy May Marshall (1902–1961), Australian schoolteacher, welfare worker and public servant
