= Tulach an t-Sionnaich =

Cairn in Scotland

Coordinates: 58°32′08″N 3°35′54″W

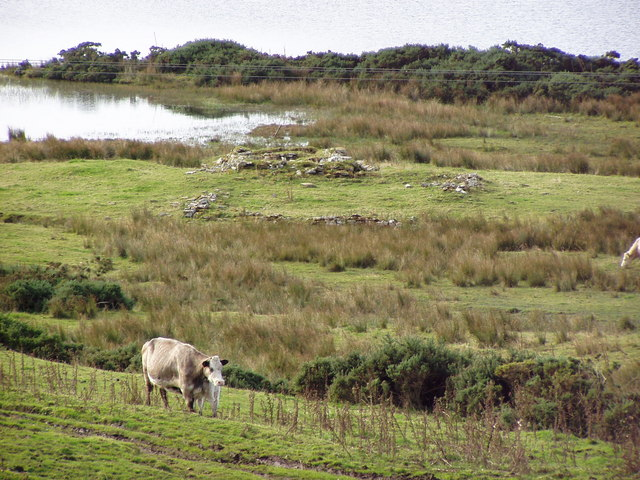
The cairn (centre)

Tulach an t-Sionnaich ("Mountain of the Fox"), is a cairn at the northern end of Loch Calder in Caithness, Scotland that has been expanded over time. It was partially excavated in 1961 and 1963. Before the excavations there was just a 60-metre (200 ft) long and 12-metre (40 ft) wide cairn with no recognizable structures. The cairn is oriented from northwest to southeast; the southeastern end being higher (1.8 m (5.9 ft)) and somewhat wider. Subsequently a ditch was cut some 15 metres (50 ft) from this end of the cairn.

The excavations revealed that the monument was initially a square passage tomb within a round cairn of 10.5 metres (34 ft) diameter. Its 2.1-metre (6.9 ft) long passage faced south. The external passage entrance was sealed by the circular stone wall that enclosed the cairn.

The first cairn may have had a D-shaped or heel-shaped platform already, but after probably only a short time, a heel-shaped cairn was built over it; this has been identified as the oldest of its type on the Scottish mainland. Its small size places it typologically into an early period within its monument class. The new façade built over the entrance to the passage tomb was not breached. Disturbances, however, prevented a complete floor plan to be reproduced. The site appears to be about 15 metres (50 ft) wide and roughly the same length. The northern end is in the area of the ditch, traces of dry stone walling were identified.

After some time the entire structure was covered by a long cairn, surrounded by a low external wall, whose southern end extended beyond the old façade. This long cairn was about 38 metres (125 ft) long and tapered from its 10.2-metre (33 ft) wide pseudo-façade to its 7.8-metre (26 ft) wide, gently convex-curved northern end. It lay roughly east of the axis of the heel-shaped cairn, probably in order to make better use of a natural ridge, and to raise the height, which apart from the southern end is nowhere above 0.9 metres (3 ft). Selective cuts into the cairn revealed cist-shaped insets that were components of the cairn structure.

Only a few finds were made, but the pottery clearly showed that the heel-shaped cairn was in use during the phase of the jewel-less Neolithic pottery era. It fell into disuse during the Beaker culture period and the long cairn had already been built before urns were deposited outside the enclosure.

The southwestern side, including the chamber of Tulach an t-Sionnaich, has been eroded by the rise in water level of Loch Calder, but the main part of the cairn has survived and is covered with grass.

== See also ==
- British megalith architecture

== Literature ==
- James L. Davidson, Audrey S. Henshall: The chambered cairns of Caithness. An inventory of the structures and their contents. Edinburgh University Press, Edinburgh, 1991, ISBN 0-7486-0256-9.
