= Heel-shaped cairn =

Type of megalithic monument

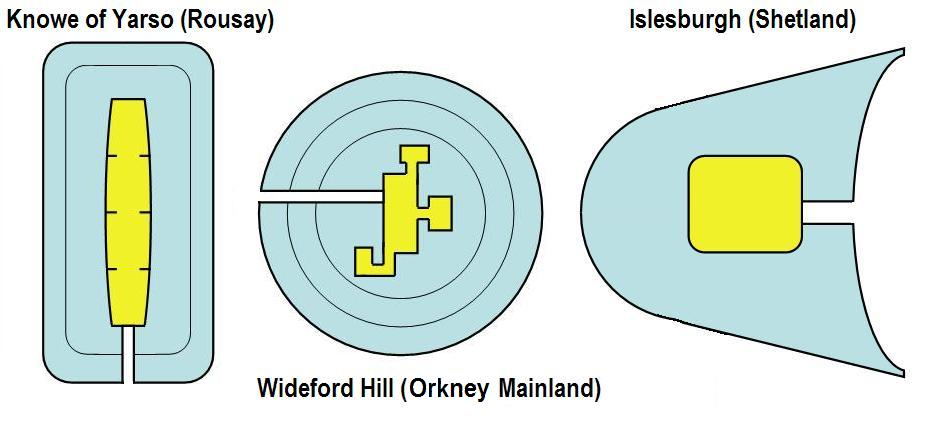
Diagram of a stalled cairn (left), a Maes Howe type (centre) and a heel-shaped cairn (right)

The heel-shaped cairn, with its usually cruciform chamber, is a type of megalithic monument that is found in Scotland, especially in Caithness and Sutherland and in the Shetland Islands. In Orkney, the Isbister Cairn is the only site that is similar in shape. The name derives from the fact that its outline resembles the imprint of the heel of a boot".

The chambers usually lie in a round cairn made of broken rocks, which either contemporaneously or later were surrounded by the eponymous platform, up to 20 metres wide at the front and from 1.0 to 1.5 metres high, and were partly enclosed by large kerbstones. A gentle concave exedra is characteristic of the front face.

The often cruciform chambers, accessed via a short passage, have a large recess at the head and two smaller recesses to the side. They were covered with corbelled vaults, of which however usually only remnants survive. The best-known sites of this type in Shetland are:

Gillaburn, Hill of Caldback, Hill of Dale, Mangaster, Muckle Heog, Pettigarth's Field, Punds Water, Turdale Water, Vementry, Viville Loch, Ward of Silwicks and Wind Hamars. The special shape of Cairn o' Get (also Garrywhin) resembles a round cairn, which was covered by a “horned long cairn” with circular chamber, as otherwise occurs in Sutherland (Camster Round and Skelpick Long). At the monument of Vementry the round cairn, with the typical chamber of heel-shaped cairns, was built over in the heel-shaped form and given a roughly 10.6-metre-wide exedra.

== See also ==
- British megalith architecture
- Chambered cairn

== Literature ==
- Audrey S. Henshall & Graham Ritchie: The Chambered Cairns of Sutherland - an inventory of the structures and their contents Edinburgh 1995, ISBN 0-7486-0609-2.
- J. L. Davidson, Audrey S. Henshall: The Chambered Cairns of Caithness: An Inventory of the Structures and Their Contents Edinburgh 1991 ISBN 0748602569
