= Unchambered long barrow =

European megalithic monument

The unchambered long barrow earthen long barrow, non-megalithic long barrow or non-megalithic mound (German: kammerloses Hünenbett or Hünenbett ohne Kammer), is a type of long barrow found across the British Isles, in a belt of land in Brittany, and in northern Europe as far east as the River Vistula (the Niedźwiedź type graves - NTT). The term "unchambered" means that there is no stone chamber within the stone enclosure. In Great Britain they are often known as non-megalithic long barrows or unchambered long cairns.

Since the 1980s, barrows of the Passy type, part of the Cerny culture, have been discovered in the French département of Essonne in the Paris Basin. These are not, however, megalithic structures.

Neolithic monuments are an expression of the culture and ideology of Neolithic communities. Their emergence and function are a hallmark of social development.

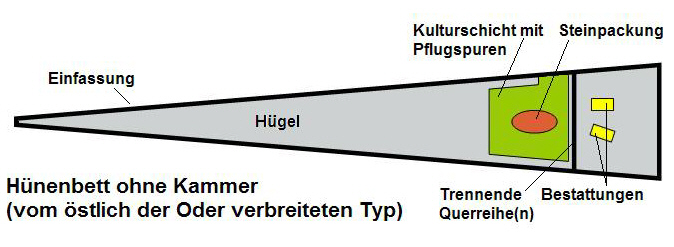
Polish unchambered long barrow of a type found east of the Oder. Key: Einfassung = enclosure, Hügel = mound, Kulturschicht mit Pflugspuren = cultural layer with plough marks, Steinpackung = stone packing, Trennende Querreihe(n) = dividing row(s), Bestattungen = graves.

== Unchambered long barrows of the Funnelbeaker culture ==
In the region occupied by the peoples of the Funnelbeaker culture (TBK), unchambered long barrows fall into the megalith category because, in many cases, their generally very low mounds, which are located mainly along the lower reaches of the rivers Elbe (Lower Elbe), Oder and Vistula, have an enclosure of megaliths, about one metre high. Due to their small dimensions they were not suitable for constructing chambers, which is why there are no chambers made of large stone blocks. The enclosures (see Nordic megalith architecture) are trapezoidal or rectangular. East of the River Oder they are often trapezoidal or triangular with rounded tips, (Mound 9 at Sarnowo, near Konin, Poland) mostly, however, without transverse walls (megalithic and non-megalithic) dividing them into separate chambers. The site of Kritzow (Ludwigslust-Parchim), has guardian stones higher than a man. Apart from the sites researched by Ewald Schuldt in Mecklenburg-Vorpommern in Gnewitz, Rothenmoor and Stralendorf there are a further 11 in the area and five more examples in the forest of Sachsenwald. One group of three grave sites was first discovered in 1969 in the Alt Plestliner Holz, Vorpommern-Greifswald. One of these enclosures is 80 metres long. Five unchambered barrows were investigated in the 19th century by J. Ritter in the county of Hagenow.

All these sites are characterized by clearly defined mounds of stone (cobbles), which are covered beneath the mound with packed boulders. In the complex of Stralendorf (Ludwigslust-Parchim county) were six such mounds of cobbles, lying transversely and longitudinally, bounded by a 125-metre-long trapezoidal enclosure. Such mounds are sometimes found outside the enclosures or are found in or adjacent to barrows in which there are chambers, for example, in two of the four barrows of Grundoldendorf. The barrow of Alter Hau in the forest of Sachsenwald has a length of 154 metres and is one of the longest sites in Nordic megalith architecture.

The Tinnum long barrow (Langbett von Tinnum) on the island of Sylt is a long barrow that has neither a chamber nor a megalithic enclosure, but is constructed of stones about the size of a football. It clearly represents a transitional type.

If one considers sites without stone enclosures, whose mound had an enclosure of wooden posts in the past, of which there is now little trace, then the category of unchambered long barrows widens further, for example, to include the Tinnum long barrow, Barkjær (in Djursland) or Danica Nørremark (on Jutland). These so-called "Konens Høj type (Danish) or Niedźwiedź type graves (Polish) are especially common in the Funnelbeaker culture area east of the River Oder.

== British Isles ==
The 200 or so British earthen long barrows were constructed with an enclosure of wooden posts. They are especially common in Wiltshire and Yorkshire. Three sites lie in Scotland and one on the Isle of Man. The barrows were formed over wooden chambers. In East Scotland there is another chamberless and non-megalithic variant: the "chamberless cairn", of which there are about 50 cairns without chambers. These only occur in England (12) in Cumbria and Northumberland.

== France ==
The earth mounds or tumuli in Brittany are pre-megalithic, such as the tertres allongés in Landes and Morbihan. They are low, slab-enclosed mounds, 15 to 35 metres wide and 40 to 100 metres long. They are rectangular or oval and contain dry walled internal structures for cremation ashes and grave goods. In the early megalithic period oversized earth mounds emerged, like the tumulus of Carnac, that has ciste-like elements. A newly discovered barrow of this type lies in La Trinité-sur-Mer.

Barrows with enclosures of wooden posts (without stone) are the Middle Neolithic enclosures of the Passy type, some of which are ascribed to the Cerny culture. This type of mound with wooden post or palisade enclosures are also found in the region of the early Funnelbeaker culture: the Konens Høj and Niedźwiedź type graves in Central Germany and Poland.

British, French and Nordic sites have no cultural connexion with one another at all.

== See also ==
- Nordic megalith architecture

== Literature ==
- Frances Lynch: Megalithic tombs and Long Barrows in Britain. Shire, Princes Risborough 1997, ISBN 0-7478-0341-2 (Shire archaeology 73).
- Seweryn Rzepecki: The roots of megalitism in the TRB culture. Instytut Archeologii Uniwersytetu Łódźkiego Poznan 2011 ISBN 978-83-933586-1-8
- Jürgen E. Walkowitz: Das Megalithsyndrom. Europäische Kultplätze der Steinzeit. Beier & Beran, Langenweißbach 2003, ISBN 3-930036-70-3 (Beiträge zur Ur- und Frühgeschichte Mitteleuropas. 36).
