= Soulton Long Barrow =

Modern memorial site in England

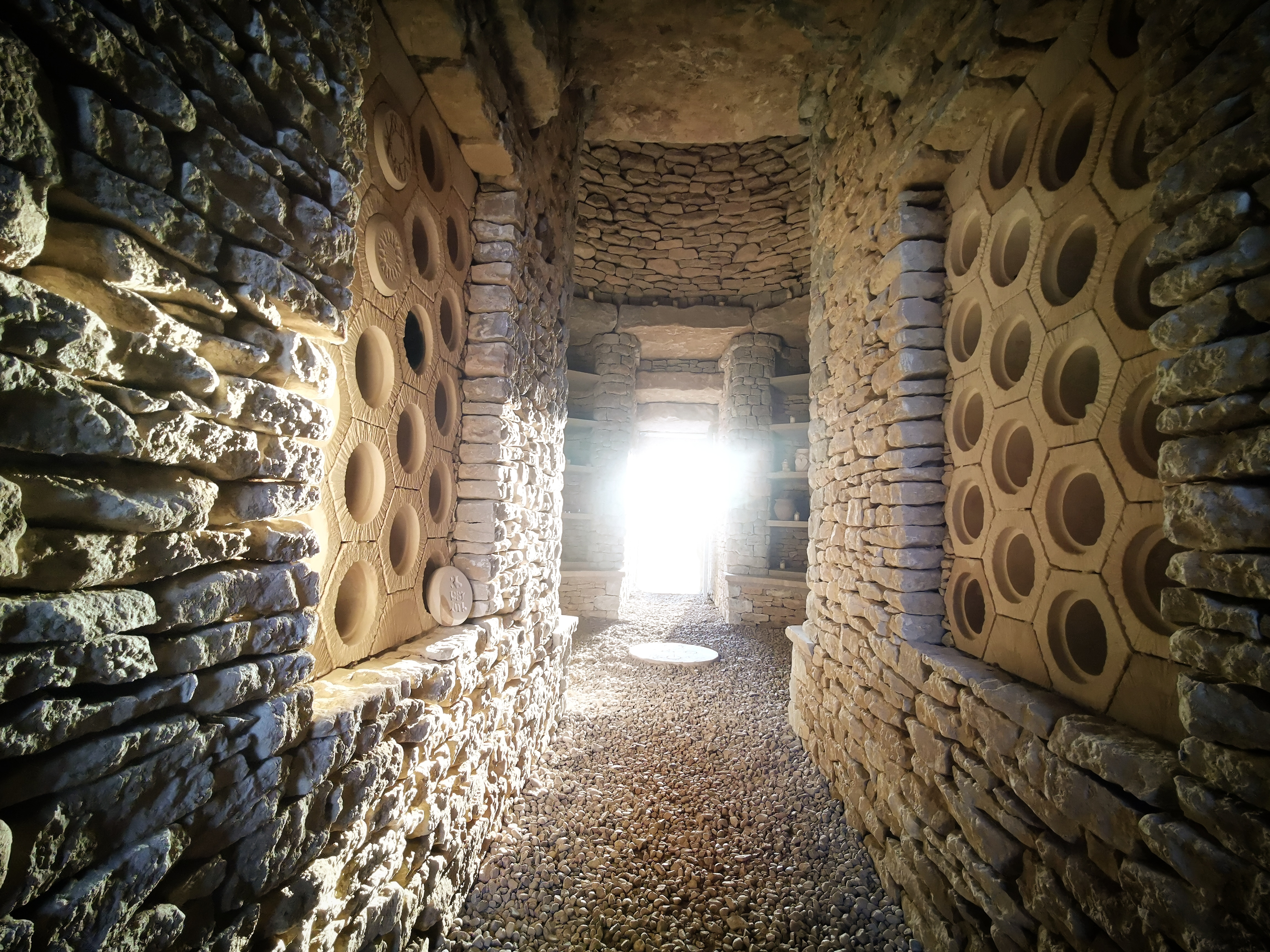
- Soulton Long Barrow just after dawn on the Summer Solstice 2020
- Interactive map of the Soulton Long Barrow area

General information
- Status: Completed
- Architectural style: Neoneolitic
- Location: Soulton, near Wem SY4 5RS
- Coordinates: 52.8738°N 2.6786°W
- Construction started: 2017
- Completed: December 2020
- Opening: 2018
- Owner: Soulton Hall

Design and construction
- Architect: Michele Gaffney (Architectural Designer)
- Developer: Sacred Stones
- Structural engineer: Jonathan Burke
- Main contractor: Riverdale Stone

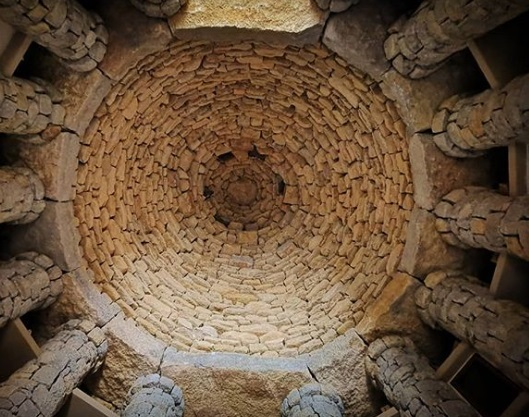
The roof of chamber 1 in the Soulton Long Barrow

The Soulton Long Barrow and Ritual Landscape is a modern memorial in the form of a long barrow in the Soulton landscape near Wem in Shropshire, England.

The barrow contains niches for the placement of cremation urns. It is also intended for wider celebration of life and community activity. The structure is a sequence of stone chambers under an earthen mound, and was begun in 2017, with a principal stone being laid in the spring of 2018, and an early stone being added by writer and historian Tom Holland.

== Inspiration ==
The monument is inspired by Neolithic barrows built around 5,500 years ago, and following the constructions of the Long Barrow at All Cannings, Wiltshire and the Willow Row Barrow at St Neots, Cambridgeshire. It takes inspiration from among other monuments Bryn Celli Ddu, Barclodiad y Gawres, and Stoney Littleton Long Barrow. Developing the barrow involved collaboration with archaeologists at the University of Cambridge

The gate for the barrow was designed by Giles Smith, winner, in the Assemble Collective, of the 2015 Turner Prize.

The Barrow's first chamber was opened for use in summer 2018.

A second phase of the barrow's development was begun and completed in the winter of 2019.

== Commentary ==
In April 2019, the monument was covered on an episode of BBC Countryfile, being visited by Matt Baker and Ellie Harrison.

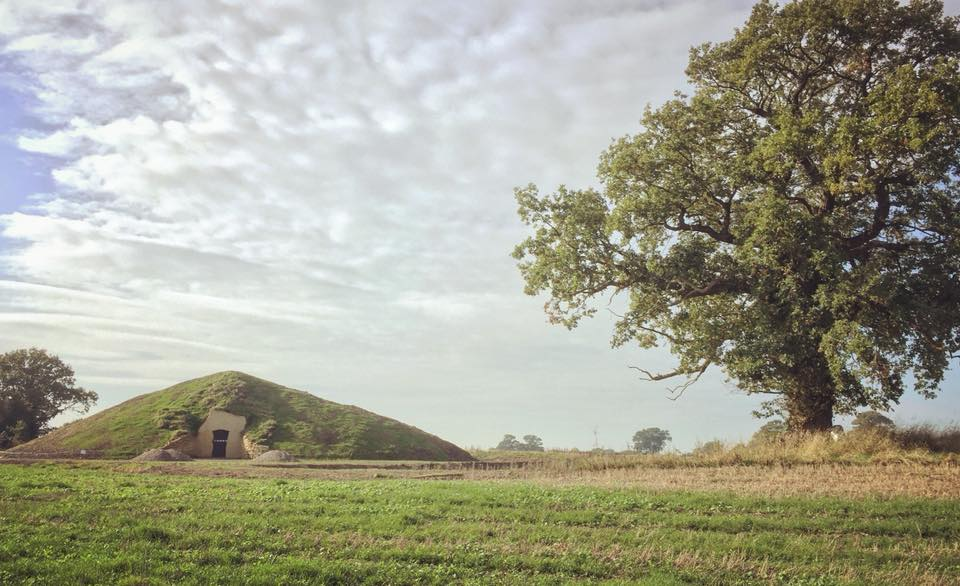
Soulton Long Barrow seen from the north and east facing the front that addresses the Summer Solstice sunrise

The monument was included in the 2020 Architecture Foundation exhibition "Congregation", in St Mary Magdalene, Paddington. The exhibition looked at, "the changing nature of sacred architecture in Britain through the presentation of 23 buildings designed in the past decade", Edwin Heathcote of the Financial Times reviewed this exhibition and said of the project "Most esoteric of all, yet also strangely sympathetic, is the Soulton Long Barrow, a neo-neolithic mound of stone and earth designed to store the cremated remains of... any religion or none".

In June 2020 the Architecture Foundation included the monument in a lecture event as part of its 2020 100 Day Studio event.

Commentators have described this barrow has been described as being part of a "Stone Age tradition being resurrected in Britain," with " [a]nother eight sites are planned across the country"

The Architectural Review reviewed the monument in April 2020.

== Culture and cultural references ==
=== Contemporary drama and performance ===
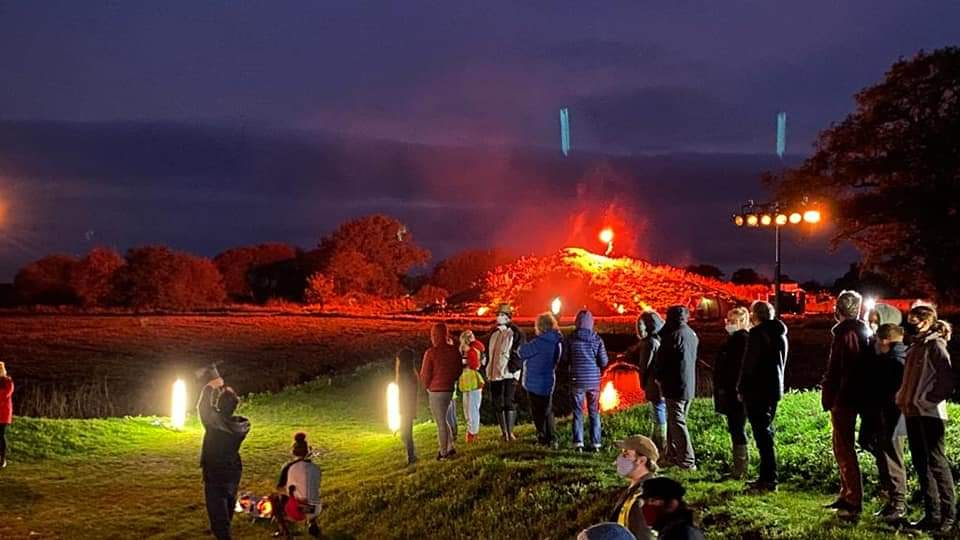
"The Sanctuary Theatre" and the barrow seen in a performance by the National Youth Theatre of Great Britain

In 2020, partially as a response to the crisis in live performance and theatre resulting from the COVID-19 pandemic, a hengeiform monument, called "The Sanctuary", an outdoor performance area was added in front of the barrow.

This was inaugurated by the National Youth Theatre, with their first live in person performance since the restrictions following the lockdown that was brought about by the COVID-19 pandemic. The play was a brand new work called "The Last Harvest".

=== Literature and poetry ===
The barrow has inspired writing, including a novella series by Katharine E. Smith, which begins with First Christmas.

The poet Merlin Fulcher has also written work inspired by the barrow.

=== Faith and religious activities ===
Local parishes used this space for community nativity events during the COVID-19 restrictions.

== Soulton Standing Stones ==
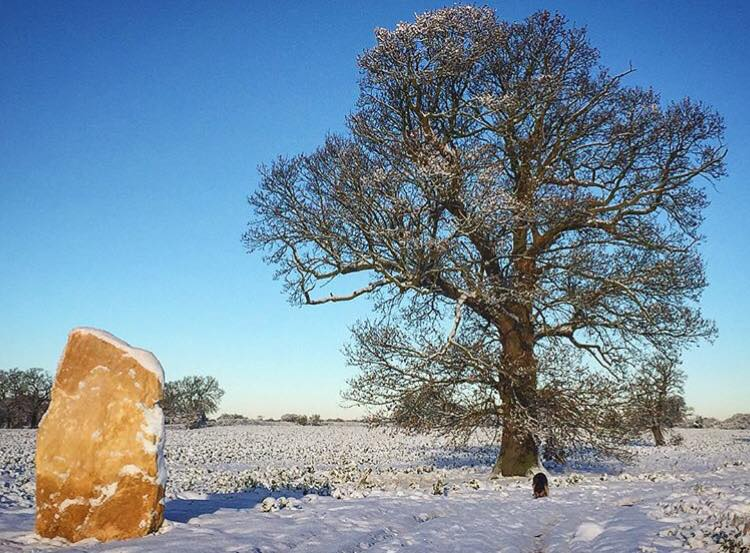
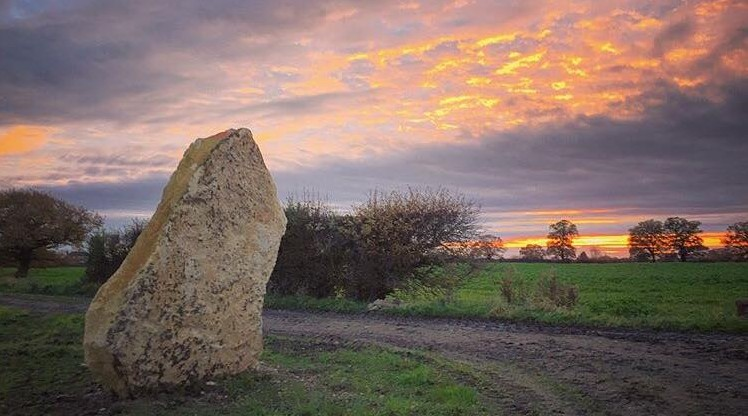
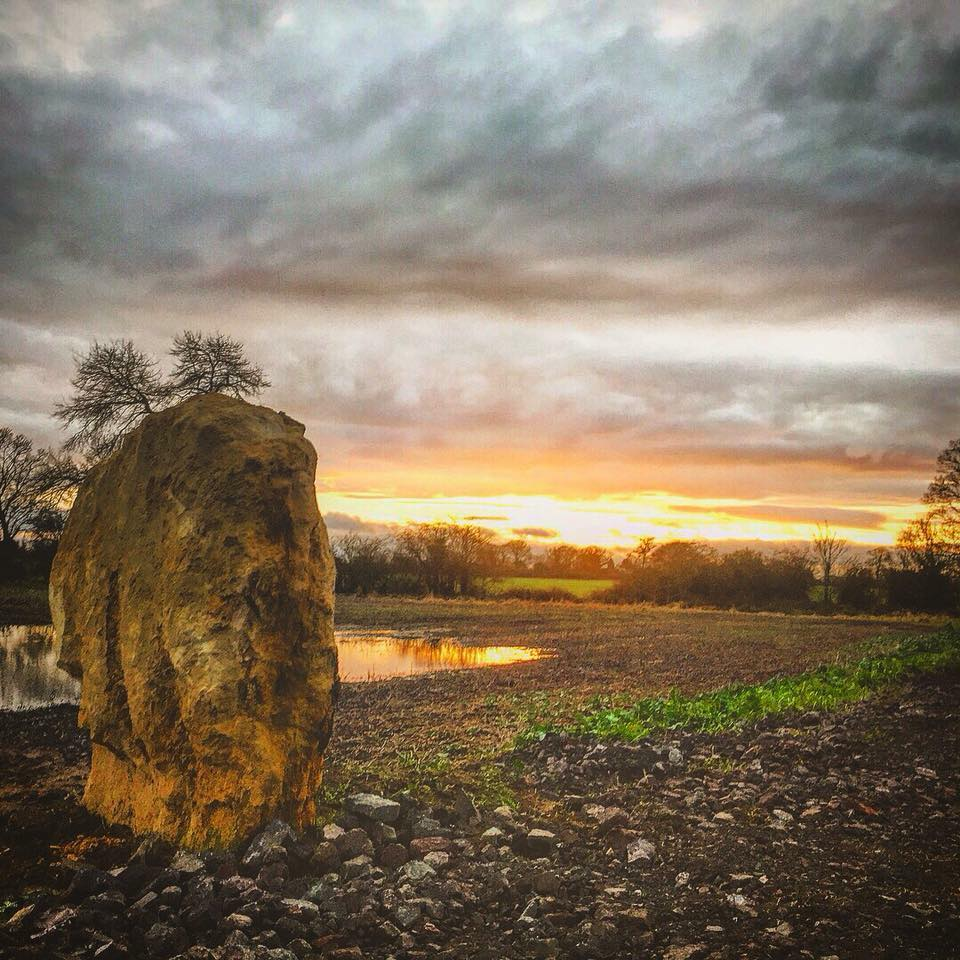
The three Soulton Standing Stones, erected in 2017

There is a sequence of standing stones, signaling the route to the barrow from Soulton Road.

Three megalithic limestone standing stones are located on the access route to the barrow which were added in autumn 2017. The stone for these monoliths, as with the barrow itself, came from Churchfield Quarry, Oundle, near Peterborough.

There is no deliberate alignment beyond way-marking for these standing stones.

=== Covid Stone ===
In 2020, a standing stone, with an alignment to the setting sun on the winter solstice, was added to the ritual landscape to acknowledge the suffering of the families impacted by the Coronavirus Pandemic. This was discussed in a podcast for Manchester Metropolitan University's BRIC-19 AHRC-funded research project looking at how British ritual-makers have responded to COVID-19.

== Modern Henge Monument ==
In March 2020, plans were announced to build a modern henge monument close by the barrow.

== See also ==
- Long Barrow at All Cannings
- Tumulus § Modern practices
