= Vementry =

Island in Shetland, Scotland

Location
- Vementry shown within Shetland
- OS grid reference: HU296606
- Coordinates: 60.3294°N 1.463022°W

Name
- Name meaning: Vémunðr's island (personal name)
- Old Norse name: Vemunðarey

Physical geography
- Island group: Shetland
- Area: 370 hectares (1.43 sq mi)
- Area rank: 80
- Highest elevation: 90 metres (295 ft) Muckle Ward

Administration
- Council area: Shetland Islands
- Country: Scotland
- Sovereign state: United Kingdom

Demographics
- Population: 0

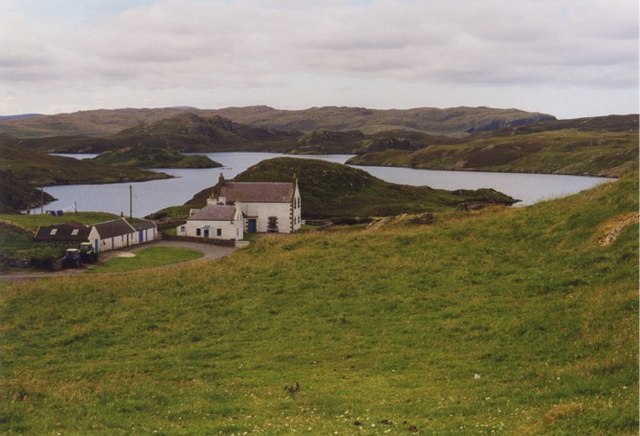
Vementry Farm, on Mainland, with Isle of Vementry in the background

Vementry (Shaetlan pronunciation: ['vɛməntri] VEM-ən-tree; Old Norse: "Vemunðarey") is an uninhabited Scottish island in Shetland on the north side of the West Mainland, lying south of Muckle Roe.

== Description and history ==
The island is known for its well-preserved chambered cairn. The well-preserved remains of a Neolithic heel-shaped cairn about 10 metres (33 feet) in diameter and rising to over 1.5 metres (4.9 feet) in height.

Also on the island are two 6-inch QF Mk I First World War gun emplacements which overlook the narrow entrance into the former naval anchorage of Busta Voe on Swarbacks Head, a cliff standing around 49 metres (161 feet) above sea level. These guns were removed from HMS Gibraltar, an Edgar-class cruiser which was acting as a depot ship for 10th Cruiser Squadron. They were manned by a mixed crew of RN sailors and Royal Marines. The guns are mounted en barbette on concrete platforms with a 0.45-metre-high (18-inch) concrete parapet and gun shield to provide protection against incoming fire. There are two ammunition lockers built into the parapet of each gun platform, and each platform is linked to a separate main magazine by a trench. A simple stone-and-concrete fire control pillbox also exists on the site. The guns were abandoned in situ after the end of the First World War and were never used after this time, having now fallen largely into a state of disrepair.

== Mainland and island ==
Vementry is also the name of a small farm on Mainland, Shetland, immediately south of the island. For this reason, it is sometimes referred to as the "Isle of Vementry". There is no ferry service to the island, although the shepherd on the mainland farm occasionally makes the short trip to work with stock on the island.

The Isle of Vementry is separated from the mainland Vementry by a narrow channel or "sound", consisting of Uyea Sound to the east and Cribba Sound to the west. Cribba Sound is famed for the quality of mussels produced at the mussel farms located there.

In 2022 a vagrant walrus named Freya stopped at a salmon farm close to the island.
