= Cerny culture =

Neolithic archaeological culture

- Geographical range: France
- Period: Neolithic
- Dates: 4700–4000 BC
- Preceded by: Linear Pottery culture
- Followed by: Castellic culture, Chasséen culture, Michelsberg culture

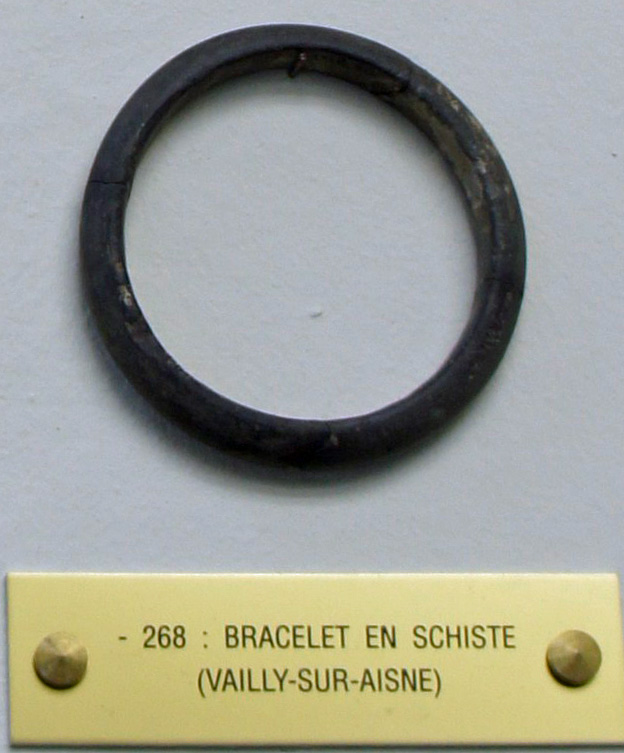
Schist bracelet

The Cerny culture (French: La Culture de Cerny, German: Cerny-Kultur) is an archaeological culture of Neolithic France dating to the second half of the 5th millennium BC. It is particularly prevalent in the Paris Basin. It is characterized by monumental earth mounds known as long barrows of the Passy type. The term is derived from the "Parc aux Bœufs" in Cerny in the department of Essonne, who authorized the name. There are studies demonstrating it is patriarchal.

== Important sites ==
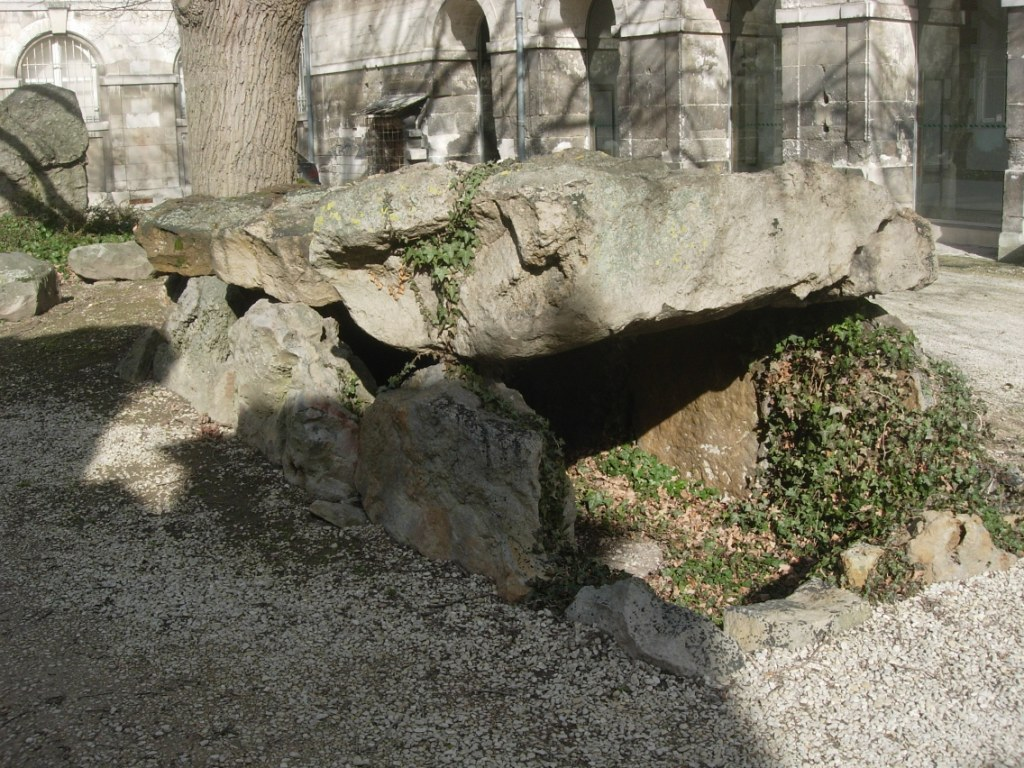
Frécul dolmen

- Parc aux Bœufs, Cerny, Essonne
- L'Étoile Neolithic Camp, L'Étoile, Somme, particularly highlighted by Roger Agache in Aerial archaeology, 1971
- Maran Neolithic Camp, Châtenay-sur-Seine, Seine-et-Marne
- Haut-des-Nachères Neolithic Camp, Noyen-sur-Seine, Seine-et-Marne
- Le Gours aux Lions, Marolles-sur-Seine, Seine-et-Marne
- Réaudins Enclosure and Balloy Necropolis, Seine-et-Marne, at the confluence of the River Yonne and River Seine.
- Barbuise-Courtavant Camp, Barbuise, Aube
- La Sabliere Necropolis, Passy-Richebourg, Département Yonne.
- Escolives-Sainte-Camille, Yonne
- Les Sablons, Gron, Yonne.
- Noue Fenard, Vignely, Seine-et-Marne
- Porte aux Bergers, Vignely, Seine-et-Marne
- Orville Necropolis, Orville, Loiret, (Cerny-Videlles)
- Site des Roches, Videlles, Essonne (Cerny-Videlles)
- Buno-Bonnevaux Necropolis, Buno-Bonnevaux, Essonne

== Literature ==
- Roger Joussaume: La culture de Cerny: Nouvelle economie, nouvelle societe au Neolithique : actes du colloque international de Nemours, 1994
