= Long Barrow at All Cannings =

Modern barrow in Wiltshire, England

The Long Barrow at All Cannings
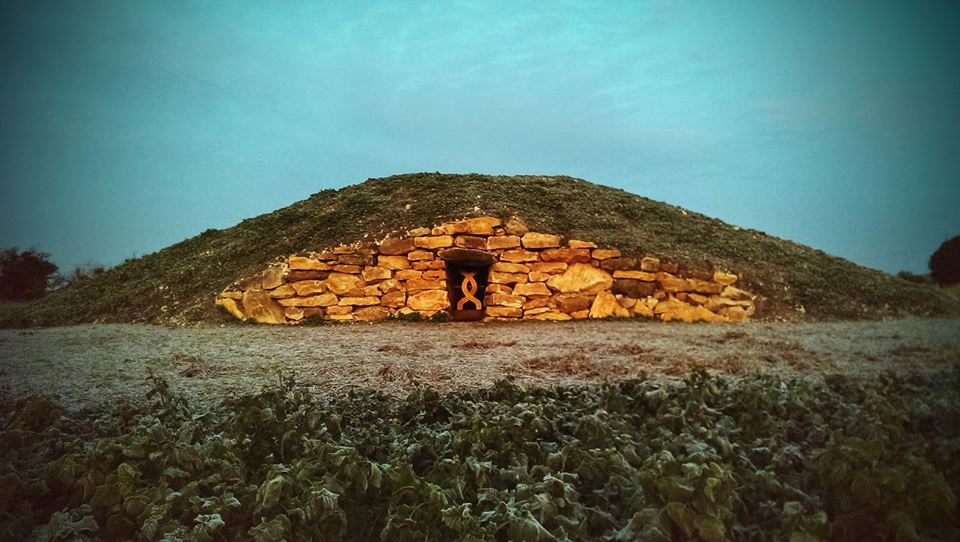
- The exterior of the monument
- Interactive map of the The Long Barrow at All Cannings area

General information
- Status: Completed
- Architectural style: Neo-neolithic
- Location: All Cannings, Wiltshire
- Coordinates: 51.3637°N 1.8961°W
- Construction started: 2014
- Completed: 2015
- Opening: 2015
- Owner: Timothy Daw

Design and construction
- Main contractor: Riverdale Stone

The Long Barrow at All Cannings is a modern barrow near All Cannings, Wiltshire, England, inspired by the Neolithic barrows built 5,500 years ago. It was the first barrow built in Britain in thousands of years.

The structure was commissioned by farmer and Stonehenge steward Timothy Daw, and completed in 2014. A sequence of stone chambers under an earthen mound contains 340 niches for the placement of cremation urns, which were sold for £1,000 each to pay for the construction of the barrow.

BBC television programme Countryfile filmed at the barrow in 2016.

In 2018 it was approved as a place of worship.

The barrow has been associated with the revival of barrow building in the UK.

== See also ==
- Soulton Long Barrow
- Tumulus § Modern practices
