= Punds Water =

Loch in Shetland

Punds Water is a freshwater loch near Mangaster in Northmavine, Shetland. It also gives its name to a nearby Neolithic heel-shaped cairn.

== Heel-shaped cairn ==
The cairn (at 60°25′25″N 1°24′45″W) is composed of large boulders and stands about 1.5 metres (5 ft) high above the surrounding peat. The facade faces east by southeast and measures more than 15 metres (50 ft) across. From front to back the cairn measures 9.8 metres (32 ft). Within the facade is the entrance to a passage leading to a trefoil-shaped burial chamber.
