= Loch Calder =

Lake in Caithness, Scotland

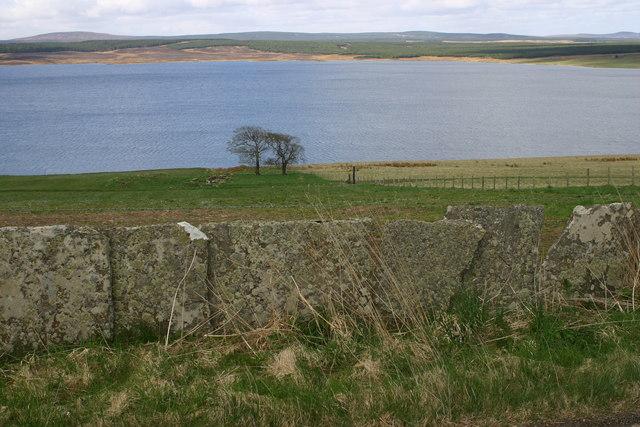

- Location within Highland
- Location: Caithness, Highland, Scotland
- Coordinates: 58.516667°N 3.583333°W
- Type: freshwater loch
- Primary inflows: Loch Olginey
- Primary outflows: Alltan Ghuinne
- Basin countries: Scotland
- Max. length: 5 mi (8.0 km)
- Max. width: 1 mi (1.6 km)
- Surface area: 381.5 ha (943 acres)
- Average depth: 21 ft (6.4 m)
- Max. depth: 85 ft (26 m)
- Water volume: 767,000,000 ft^{3} (21,700,000 m^{3})
- Shore length^{1}: 12.9 km (8.0 mi)
- Surface elevation: 66 m (217 ft)
- Islands: 0
- ^{1} Shore length is not a well-defined measure.

Loch Calder is a lowland freshwater loch lying approximately 5 mi (8.0 km) south west of Thurso in the Scottish Highlands. The loch is large with an irregular shape and has perimeter of 12.8 km (8.0 mi). It is approximately 2.33 mi (3.75 km) long, has an average depth of 21 ft (6.4 m) and is 85 ft (26 m) at its deepest. The loch was surveyed on 6 October 1902 by John Parsons and T.R.H. Garrett and later charted as part of Sir John Murray's Bathymetrical Survey of Fresh-Water Lochs of Scotland 1897-1909.

Around the loch are several archaeological remains. At the northern end of the loch is Tulach an t'Sionnaich, a well preserved chambered cairn, one of two cairns known as the Tullochs of Assery. On the eastern shore, near Achavarn, lies the site of a broch, although much of the structure has been removed. It is thought that there was an artificial island or crannog near the western shore dating from the 17th century. The island, known as Big Island, may have contained a dwelling which was said to be that of a robber. A short distance to the west of the loch is Aultan Broubster a ruined stone circle. Several of the stones remain, five of which are upright with the largest being 1.3 m (4 ft 3 in) high.

The loch is a Scottish Natural Heritage Site of Special Scientific Interest for its Greenland white-fronted goose, Greylag goose and Whooper swans.

The loch is popular for fishing and contains trout, Arctic char and ferox trout.
