= Dorothy Marshall (archaeologist) =

Scottish archaeologist

- Occupation: Archaeologist
- Known for: Archaeology in Scotland, particularly on the Isle of Bute and Argyll

Academic background
- Education: Institute of Archaeology in London

Academic work
- Notable works: Carved Stone Balls (1979) History of Bute (1992)

Dorothy Nairn Marshall FSAScot (1900-1992) was a Scottish archaeologist. She is known for her archaeological work in Scotland, particularly on the Isle of Bute and Argyll.

== Early life ==
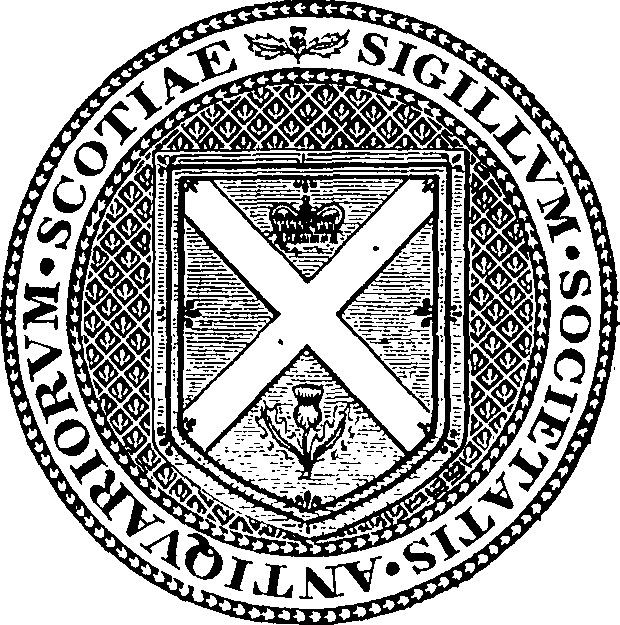
Society of Antiquaries of Scotland

Marshall was the youngest of three daughters. Her father, Dr. John Nairn Marshall, was a longstanding member of the Society of Antiquaries of Scotland and a general practitioner on Isle of Bute, where Dorothy grew up. While Marshall's older sisters left the island to pursue careers, Marshall remained at home to drive her father on rounds, and to later assist in caring for her parents. After death of parents Marshall began to fully engage in her own interests, archaeology being among them. She became an antiquarian in 1945, and went on to study at the Institute of Archaeology in London, where she received professional qualifications. After this, she spent several seasons of excavation in Middle East in Cyprus and then later in Jericho with Dr. Kathleen Kenyon. Marshall was the finds recorder for these excavations.

Her father had been a founding member of the Buteshire Natural History Society and the Bute Museum, and Marshall worked with both institutions. In association with the Natural History Society she ran a Junior Naturalists' Club. Additionally, she was a strong supporter of the Scottish Regional Group of the Council for British Archaeology (now the Archaeology Scotland). She was involved in the publication of the Transactions of the Buteshire Natural History Society, which published archaeological and historical papers.

== Excavations ==
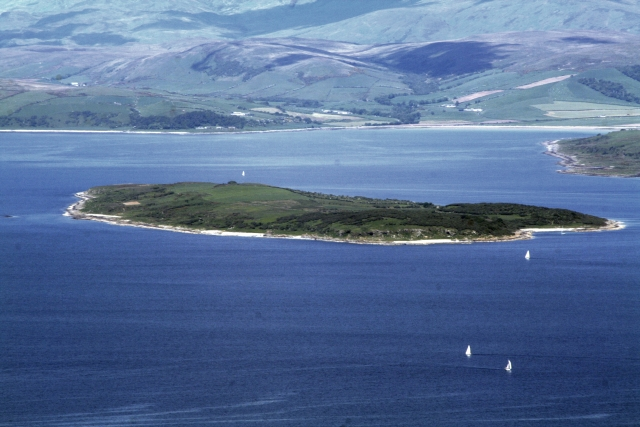
Inchmarnock

At the beginning of her career as an archaeologist Marshall was involved in excavations in Cyprus and later Jericho, where she was a finds recorder. She later became involved in Scottish archaeology, particularly in excavations taking place on Bute.

In the late 1950s Marshall was involved in the excavations of possible Viking houses at Little Dunagoil.

In 1960 Marshall excavated a group of three cists on the island of Inchmarnock. One of the cists contained the remains of a woman who came to be known by Marshall as "The Queen of the Inch." A necklace made of jet and lignite and a flint knife were found with her.

In 1979 in Glenvoidean Marshall excavated collection of Neolithic pots.

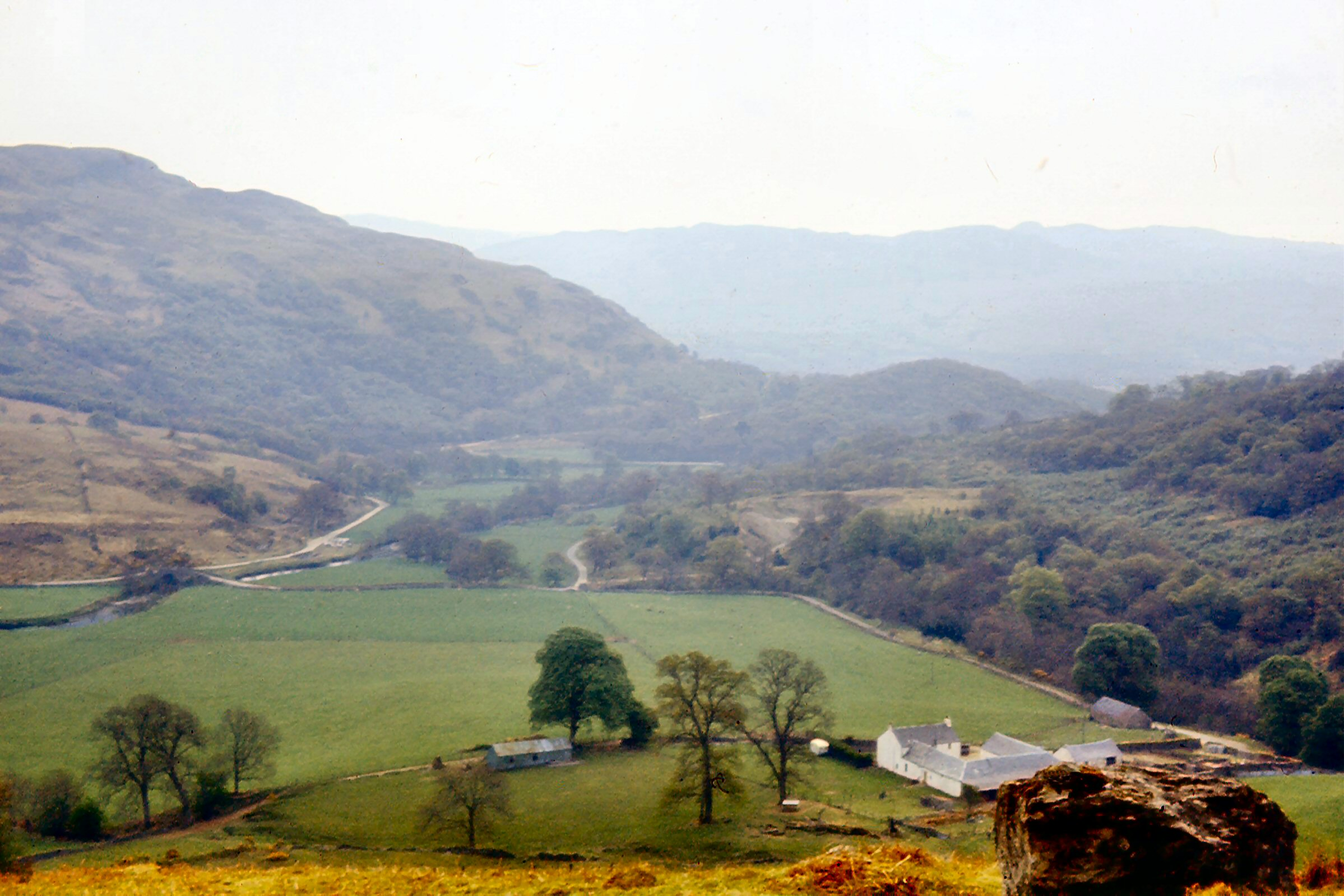
Glendaruel

In 1980 Marshall was involved in excavations at Auchategan, Glendaruel, Argyll, where a multiperiod site was excavated. The site included two neolithic phases, which included the remains of two small roundhouses and some hearths, as well as artefacts including greenstone axes, flint knives, arrowheads, and scrapers, and Grimston-style pottery. The succeeding phases consisted of a semi-circular cairn and cist, an isolated cist and hearth, an oblong timber-built house (possibly dating to the Late Iron Age), the remains of an iron bloomery and hearth (radiocarbon dated to the 7th century CE), a rectangular stone-built house and approximately four medieval stone built circular and rectilinear houses.

== Published works ==
- A Square Earthwork at Hangingshaw, Yarrow, Selkirkshire, 1969
- Small Cairns in Argyll: Some Recent Work, 1977 (co-author)
- Carved Stone Balls, 1979
- The Excavation of the Chambered Cairn at Glenvoidean, Isle of Bute, 1979 (co-author)
- Excavations at Auchategan, Glendaruel, Argyll, 1980
- Two Neolithic Axeheads from Inchmarnock off Bute, 1980
- Further Notes on Carved Stone Balls, 1984
- History of Bute, 1992

== Dorothy Marshall Medal ==
The Dorothy Marshall Medal, named for her, is awarded by the Society of Antiquaries of Scotland every three years to an individual who has made an outstanding contribution to Scottish archaeology or related work. The Medal was first awarded in 1995 to Tam Ward FSAScot for his fieldwork around Biggar. Subsequent winners include Bill Cormack FSAScot (1998), Elizabeth Rennie FSAScot (2001), Major Patrick Cave-Browne FSAScot (2004), Iain Keillar (2007), Walter Elliot FSAScot (2010), Jean Comrie FSAScot (2013), Audrey Henshall FSAScot (2016), Anne Speirs FSAScot (2019), and Martin Wildgoose (2022). The medal was most recently awarded in 2025 to Christine Yuill FSAScot for her work at the National Museums Scotland.
