= Unchambered long cairn =

Type of cairn

Unchambered long cairns (sometimes also chamberless long cairns) are found in Scotland and Northern England, and form a group of non- or semi-megalithic monuments. There are about 28 long cairns in north Scotland and 21 in south Scotland that show no evidence of internal stone chambers. However, proving the existence of wooden chambers under a cairn is not possible without excavation work. The exact classification of this group of monuments is therefore not easy. Three particularly noteworthy examples of these cairns are:

- Dalladies in Kincardineshire, with cup and ring marks
- Slewcairn in Kirkcudbrightshire.
- Lochhill in Kirkcudbrightshire.

All have narrow rectangular chambers whose positions are marked by wooden posts. The last two are especially interesting, because stone chambers were built into the mound at a later date. These make the connexions and overlaps of ideas clearly visible, something which can otherwise only be imagined from their classification by type.

Although none of the northern cairns has been excavated, their existence is significant for the architectural history of Scotland. The north is a region where passage tombs in circular cairns are especially common (the Orkney-Cromarty type). Sites that span several periods of time, such as Tulach an t'Sionnaich, demonstrate that both forms were used by the same communities. Several round cairns, like those of Camster had long cairns built over them, so that the round mound here retains its older shape. Many chamberless cairns and those with stone chambers have concave forecourts which are reminiscent of those that had been built earlier of wood (Haddenham and Street House) in Yorkshire.

== See also ==
- Long barrow

== General references ==
- Frances Lynch: Megalithic Tombs and Long Barrows in Britain. Shire Publications Ltd. 1997 ISBN 0-7478-0341-2.
