= Long barrow =

Type of Neolithic monument

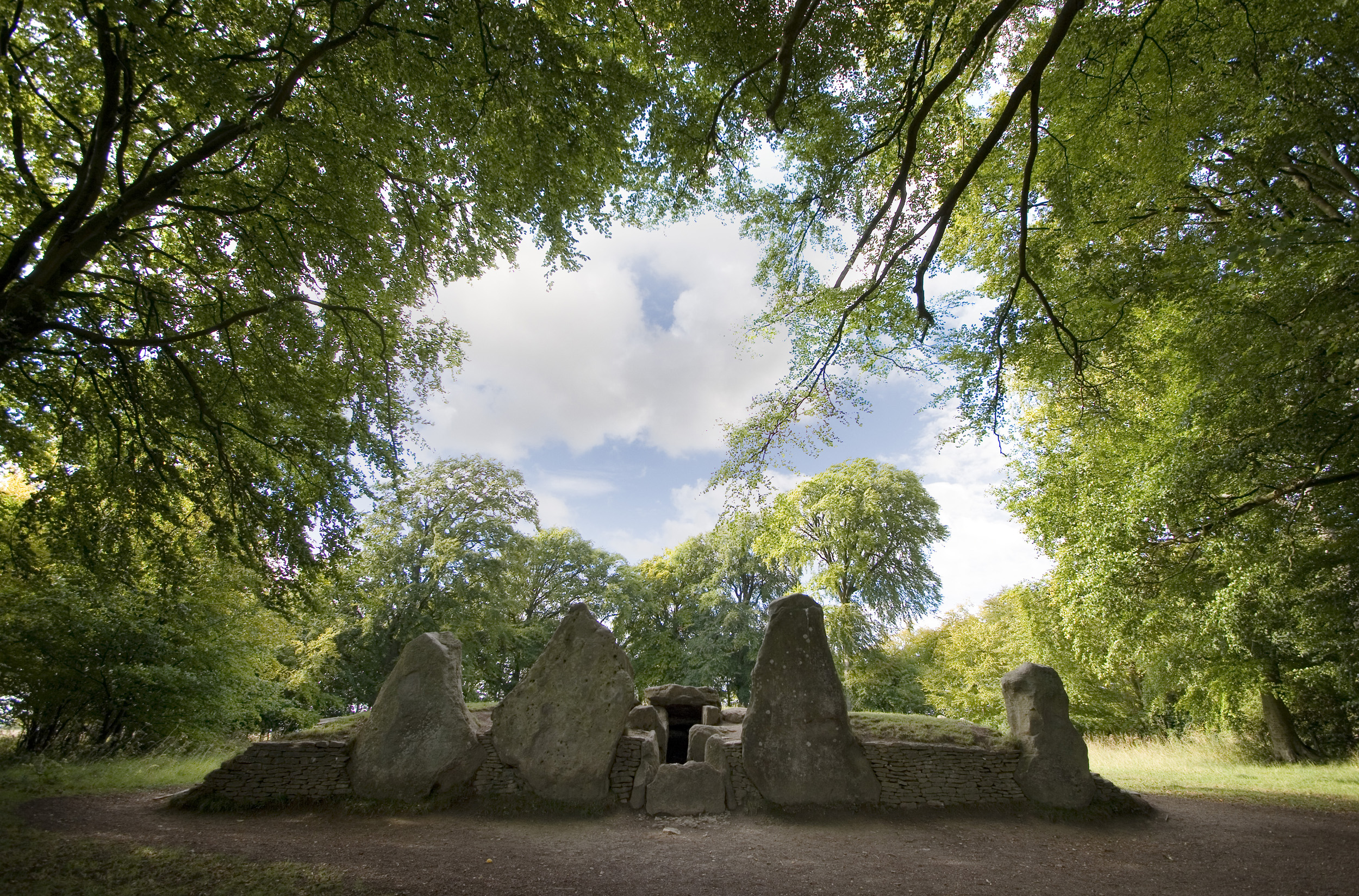
Wayland's Smithy long barrow near Uffington, Oxfordshire, England

Long barrows are a style of monument constructed across Western Europe in the 5th and 4th millennia BCE, during the Early Neolithic period, typically made from earth and either timber or stone. Those using stone represent the oldest widespread tradition of stone construction in the world. Around 40,000 long barrows survive today.

The structures have a long earthen tumulus or "barrow" that is flanked on two sides with linear ditches. These typically stretch for between 20 and 70 metres in length, although some exceptional examples are either longer or shorter than this. Some examples have a timber or stone chamber in one end of the tumulus. These monuments often contained human remains interred within their chambers and thus are often interpreted as tombs, although there are some examples where this appears not to be the case. The choice of timber or stone may have arisen from the availability of local materials rather than cultural differences. Those that contained chambers inside of them are often termed chambered long barrows while those which lack chambers are instead called unchambered long barrows or earthen long barrows.

The earliest examples developed in Iberia and western France during the mid-5th millennium BCE. The tradition then spread northwards, into the British Isles and then the Low Countries and southern Scandinavia. Each area developed its own variations of the long barrow tradition, often exhibiting their own architectural innovations. The purpose and meaning of the barrows remain an issue of debate among archaeologists. One argument is that they are religious sites, perhaps erected as part of a system of ancestor veneration or as a religion spread by missionaries or settlers. An alternative explanation views them primarily in economic terms, as territorial markers delineating the areas controlled by different communities as they transitioned toward farming.

Communities continued to use these long barrows long after their construction. In both the Roman period and the Early Middle Ages, many long barrows were reused as cemeteries. Since the 16th century they have attracted interest from antiquarians and archaeologists. Some have been reconstructed and have become tourist attractions or sacred sites used for rituals by modern pagan and other religious groups.

== Terminology and definition ==
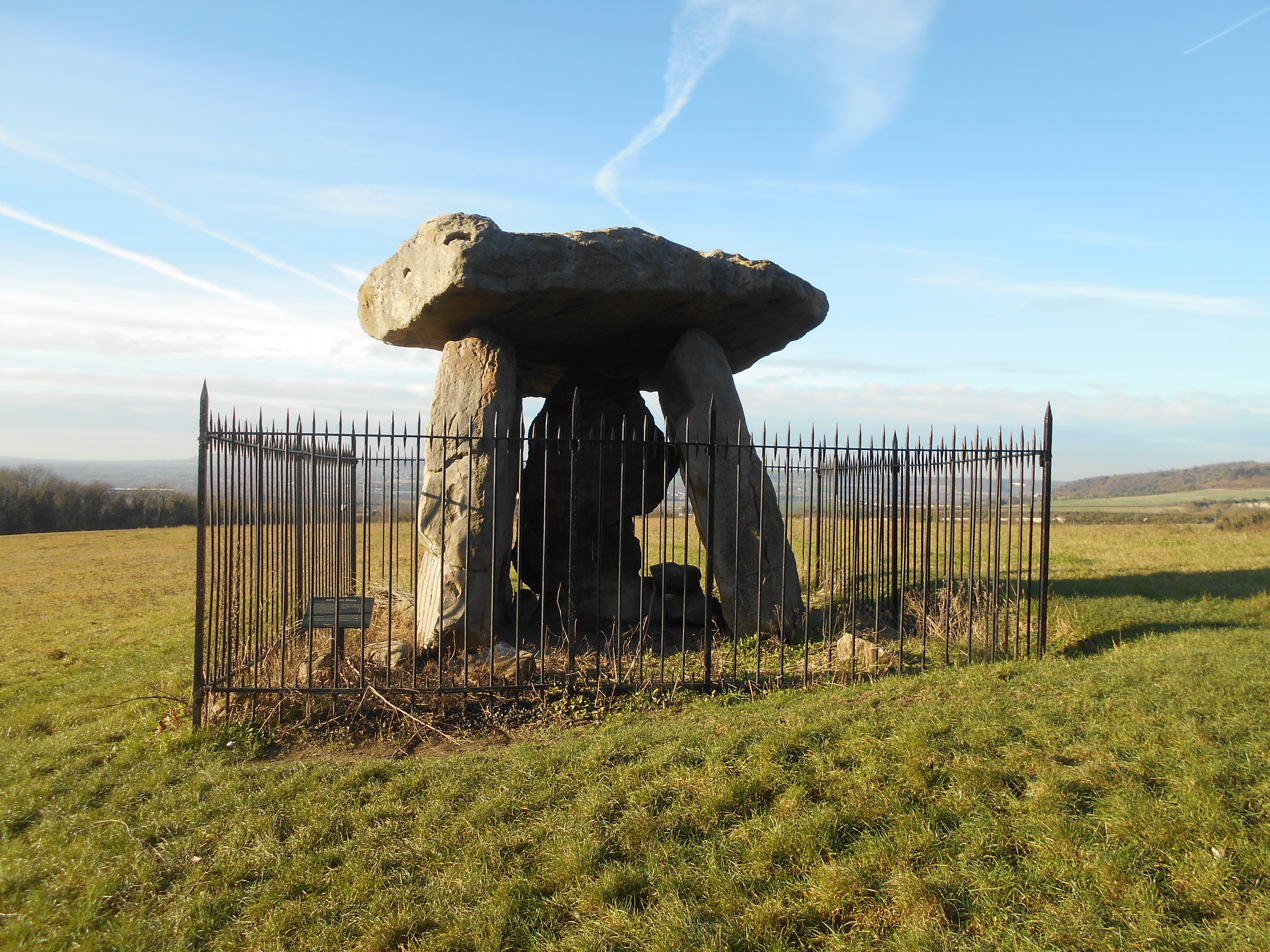
In cases such as Kit's Coty House, Kent, the earthen mound of a long barrow has been worn away by the weather or removed, exposing a stone chamber within. In this case, the surviving chamber represents a trilithon that is commonly called a dolmen.

Given their dispersal across Western Europe, long barrows have been given different names in the various different languages of this region. The term barrow is a southern English dialect word for an earthen tumulus, adopted as a scholarly term by 17th-century English antiquarian John Aubrey. Synonyms found in other parts of Britain included low in Cheshire, Staffordshire, and Derbyshire, tump in Gloucestershire and Hereford, howe in Northern England and Scotland, and cairn in Scotland. Another term to have achieved international usage has been dolmen, a Breton word meaning "table-stone"; this is typically used in reference to the stone chambers found in some, although not all, long barrows. Early 20th-century archaeologists began to call these monuments chambered tombs. Roy and Lesley Adkins refer to these monuments as megalithic long barrows.

Historian Ronald Hutton suggests that such sites could also be termed "tomb-shrines" to reflect the fact that they appear to have often been used both to house the remains of the dead and to have been used in ritual activities. Some contain no burials while others have been found to contain the remains of up to 50 people.

=== Chambered and earthen ===
In most cases, local stone was used where it was available. The decision as to whether a long barrow used wood or stone appears to have been based largely on the availability of resources. The style of the chamber falls into two categories. One form, known as grottes sepulchrales artificielles in French archaeology, is dug into the earth. The second form, which is more widespread, is known as cryptes dolmeniques in French archaeology and involved the chamber being erected above ground. Many chambered long barrows contained side chambers within them, often producing a cruciform shape. Others had no such side alcoves; these are known as undifferentiated tombs.

Some long barrows do not contain chambers inside of them. John Thurnham terms these "unchambered" barrows, while Stuart Piggott favours the term "earthen" barrows. Ian Kinnes uses the term "non-megalithic barrows". These long barrows might have used timber because stone was not available. Some classification systems, such as that employed by the United Kingdom's National Monuments Record, do not distinguish between the different types of long barrow.

Archaeologist David Field notes that drawing typological distinctions on the basis of material used can mask important similarities between different long barrows. Also criticising the focus on classification, archaeologists David Lewis-Williams and David Pearce believe that doing so distracts scholars from the task of explaining the meaning and purpose behind the monuments.

== Design and architecture ==
Long barrows are single mounds, usually of earth, which are flanked by ditches. They are usually between 20 and 70 metres in length, although there are some exceptional examples at either end of this spectrum. Construction in the Early Neolithic would have required the co-operation of many people and would have represented an important investment in time and resources. They were built without the use of metal tools. There is often regional variation in style and material. In the north and west of Britain, for instance, long barrows often consist of stone mounds containing chambers inside of them, whereas in the south and east of Britain these long barrows are typically made of earth.

Many were altered and restyled over their long period of use. Ascertaining at what date a long barrow was constructed is difficult for archaeologists as a result of the various modifications that were made to the monument during the Early Neolithic. Similarly, both modifications and later damage can make it difficult to determine the nature of the original long barrow design.

Architecturally, there is much overlap between long barrows and other monument types from Neolithic Europe, such as the bank barrows, cursus monuments, long cairns, and mortuary enclosures. Bank barrows are stylistically similar to the long barrows but are considerably longer. Cursus monuments also exhibit parallel ditches, but also extend over much longer distances than the long barrows. Enviro-archaeological studies have demonstrated that many of the long barrows were erected in wooded landscapes. In Britain, these chambered long barrows are typically located on prominent hills and slopes, in particular being located above rivers and inlets and overlooking valleys. In Britain, long barrows were also often constructed near to causewayed enclosures, a form of earthen monument.

== Distribution and chronology ==
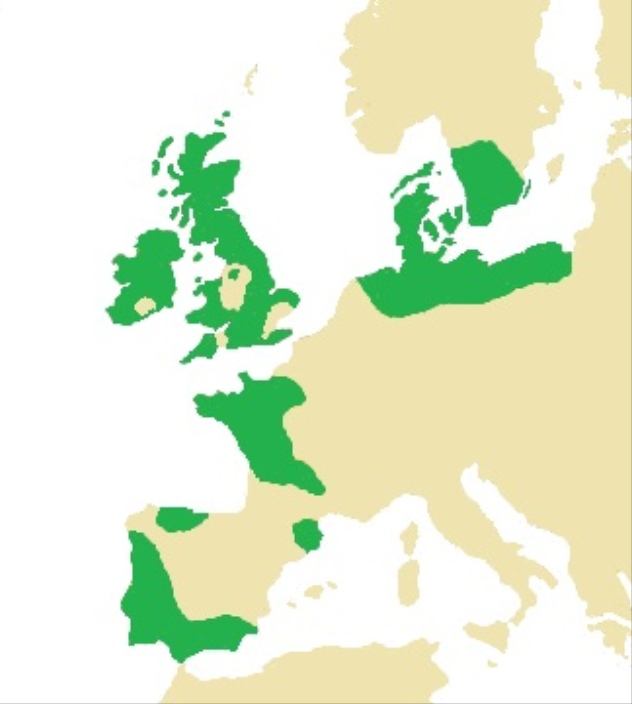
The distribution of known Early Neolithic long barrows and related funerary monuments

Across Europe, about 40,000 long barrows are known to survive from the Early Neolithic. They are found across much of Western Europe; stretching from southeast Spain up to southern Sweden and taking in the British Isles to the west. The long barrows are not the world's oldest known structures using stone—they are predated by Göbekli Tepe in modern Turkey—but they do represent the oldest widespread tradition of using stone in construction. Archaeologist Frances Lynch describes them as "the oldest built structures in Europe" to survive, while Field notes that they are the earliest monuments surviving in Britain. Although found across this large area, they can be subdivided into clear regionalised traditions based on architectural differences.

Excavation has revealed that some of the long barrows in the area of modern Spain, Portugal, and western France were erected in the mid-5th millennium BCE, making these older than those long barrows further north. Although the general area in which the oldest long barrows were built is therefore known, archaeologists do not know exactly where the tradition started nor which long barrows are the very first ones to have been built. It therefore appears that the architectural tradition developed in this southern area of Western Europe before spreading north, along the Atlantic coast. The tradition had reached Britain by the first half of the 4th millennium BCE, either soon after farming or in some cases perhaps just before it. It later spread further north on mainland Europe, for instance arriving in the Netherlands in the second half of the fourth millennium BCE.

Later in the Neolithic, burial practices tended to place greater emphasis on the individual, suggesting a growing social hierarchy and a move away from collective burial. One of the last chambered tombs erected was Bryn Celli Ddu in Anglesey, Wales, built long after people stopped building them across most of Western Europe. The conscious anachronism of the monument led excavators to suggest that its construction was part of a deliberate attempt by people to restore older religious practices that were extinct elsewhere.

Hutton suggests that this tradition "defines the Early Neolithic of Western Europe" more than any other, while Field describes them as "among the best known and easily recognised archaeological monuments in the [British] landscape." Caroline Malone states the long barrows are "some of the most impressive and aesthetically distinctive constructions of prehistoric Britain". Her fellow archaeologist Frances Lynch states these long barrows "can still inspire awe, wonder and curiosity even in modern populations familiar with Gothic cathedrals and towering skyscrapers."

=== Regional variation ===
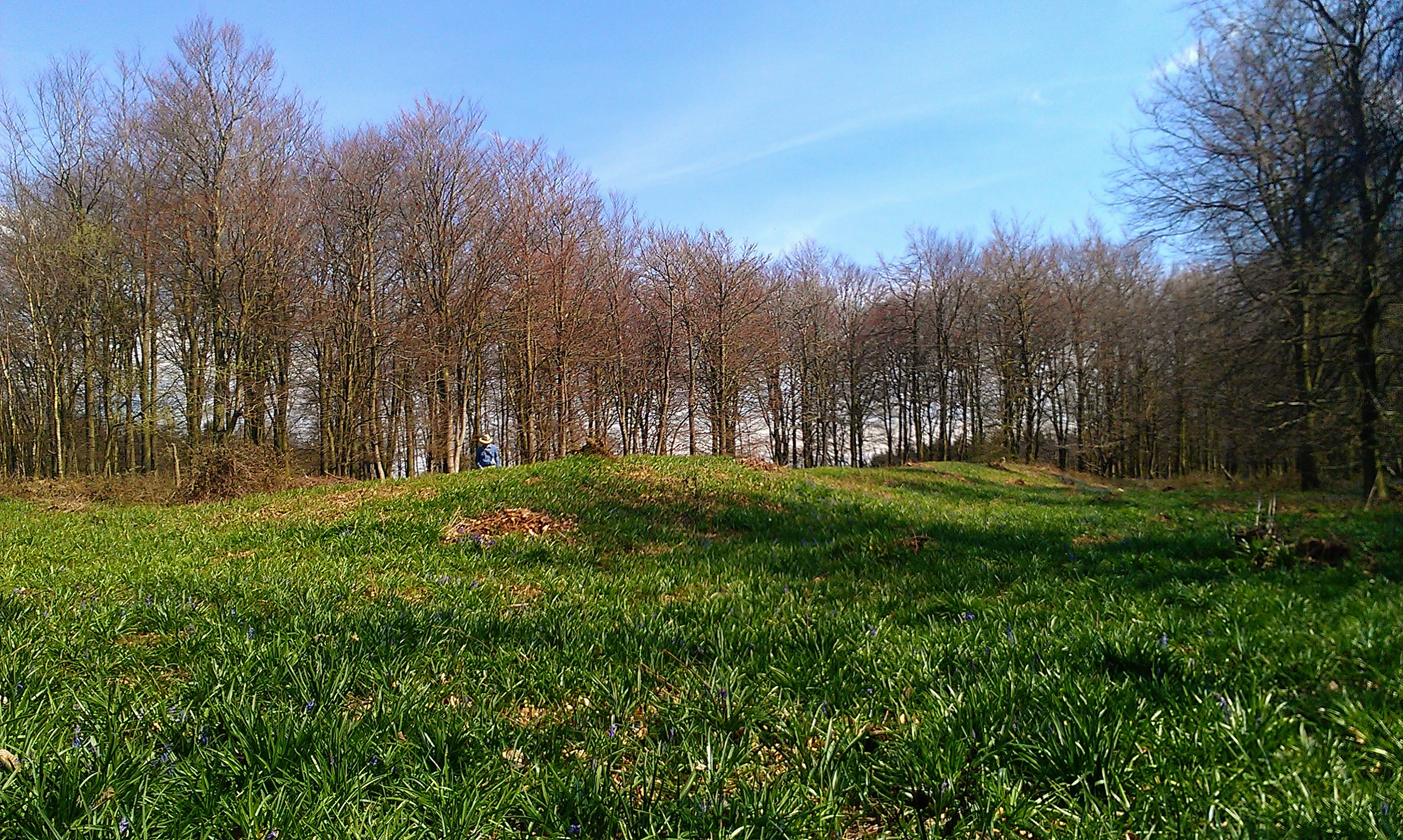
Jacket's Field Long Barrow, one of the earthen long barrows that are clustered around the River Stour in Kent

In the area of southern Spain, Portugal, southwestern France, and Brittany, the long barrows typically include large stone chambers. In Britain, earthen long barrows predominate across much of the southern and eastern parts of the island. Around 300 earthen long barrows are known from across the eastern side of Britain, from Aberdeenshire in the north down to the South Downs in the south, with two projections westward into Dorset and Galloway. Excavation suggests that these earthen long barrows were likely constructed between 3800 and 3000 BCE.

Another prominent regional tradition in Britain is the Cotswold-Severn Group found in the west of the island. These are typically chambered long barrows, and contained human bone in comparatively large quantities, averaging between 40 and 50 people in each.

The long barrows found in the Netherlands and northern Germany also used stone in their construction where it was available. The examples of long barrows found in parts of Poland are also typically earthen rather than megalithic. Further north, in Denmark and southern Sweden, the long barrows typically used stone in their construction.

== Function ==
The purpose and meaning of Early Neolithic long barrows are not known, though archaeologists can make suggestions on the basis of recurring patterns that can be observed within the tradition. Archaeologists have not, however, agreed upon the most likely meaning and purpose of these monuments, with various different interpretations being put forward. Lynch suggests that the long barrows likely had "broad religious and social roles" for the communities who built and used them, comparing them in this way to the churches of medieval and modern Europe.

=== Funerary spaces ===
Many of the long barrows were used as tombs in which to place the remains of deceased individuals. For this reason, archaeologists like Malone refer to them as "houses of the dead". Conversely, many of the long barrows do not appear to have been used as tombs; various examples that have been excavated by archaeologists have shown no evidence of having had human remains deposited there. Lewis-Williams and Pearce, however, note that these long barrows were more than tombs, also being "religious and social foci", suggesting that they were places where the dead were visited by the living and where people maintained relationships with the deceased.

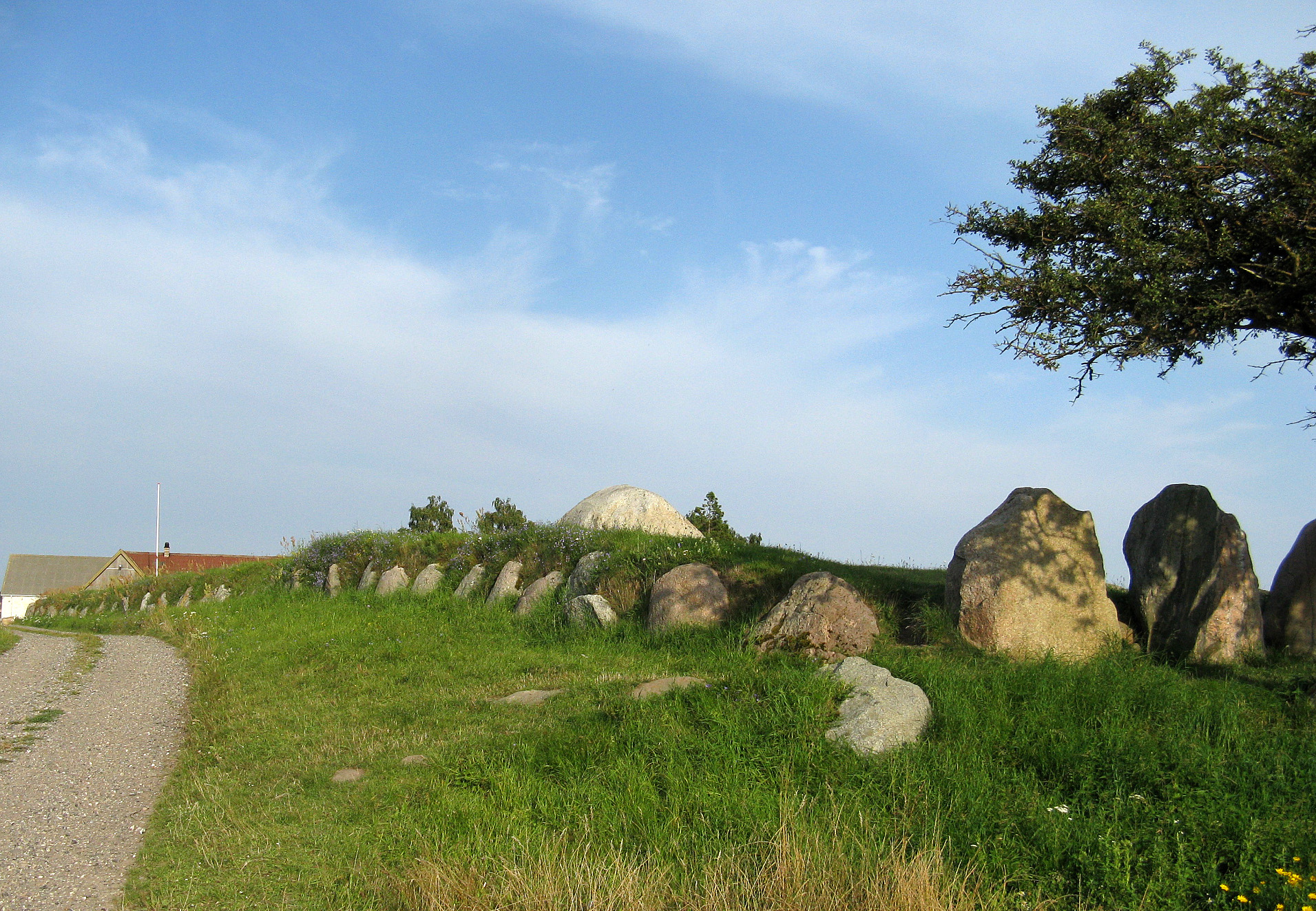
The Grønsalen Barrow on the Danish island of Møn

In some cases, the bones deposited in the chamber may have been old when placed there. In other instances, they may have been placed into the chamber long after the long barrow was built. In some instances, collections of bone originally included in the chamber might have been removed and replaced during the Early Neolithic.

The human remains placed in long barrows often include a mix of men, women, and children. The bones of various individuals were often mixed together. This may have reflected a desire to obliterate distinctions of wealth and status among the deceased. Not all of those who died in the Early Neolithic were buried in these long barrows, although it remains unknown what criteria were used to determine whose remains were interred there. Large sections of the Early Neolithic population were not buried in them, although how their bodily remains were dealt with is not clear. It is possible that they were left in the open air.

It is also not known where the act of excarnation took place prior to the deposition of bones within the chambers. Some human bones have been found in the ditches of causewayed enclosures, a form of Early Neolithic earthen monument, while evidence for the Early Neolithic outdoor exposure of corpses has also been found at Hambledon Hill. The postholes found in front of many long barrows may also have represented the bases of platforms on which excarnation took place.

When entering the chambers to either add or remove new material, individuals would likely have been exposed to the smell of decaying corpses. It is unknown if entering this area was therefore seen by Early Neolithic Europeans as an ordeal to be overcome or an honourable job for which to be selected. In some chambers, human remains were arranged and organised according to the type of bone or the age and sex of the individual that they came from, factors that determined which chamber they were placed in. Lynch notes "the bulk of our surviving evidence suggests that collectivity became and remained the norm until the late neolithic".

Comparatively rarely, grave goods have been found interred alongside human bone inside the long barrows. Where these have been found, archaeologists have typically interpreted them as the remains of funerary ceremonies or of feasts. The choice of grave goods included reflects regional variation. In the Cotswold-Severn Group in southwestern England, cattle bones were commonly found within the chambers, where they had often been treated in a manner akin to the human remains.

Sometimes human remains were deposited in the chambers over many centuries. For instance, at West Kennet Long Barrow in Wiltshire, southern England, the earliest depositions of human remains were radiocarbon dated to the early-to-mid 4th millennium BCE, while a later deposition of human remains was found to belong to the Beaker culture, thus indicating late 3rd millennium BCE; this meant that human remains had been placed into the chamber intermittently over a period of 1,500 years. This indicates that some chambered long barrows remained in sporadic use until the Late Neolithic.

In various cases, archaeologists have found specific bones absent from the assemblages within the chambers. For instance, at Fussell's Lodge in Wiltshire, southern England, several skeletal assemblages were found to be missing small bones as well as long bones and skulls. It is therefore possible that some bones were deliberately removed from the chambers in the Early Neolithic for use in ritualistic activities.

=== Origins of the design ===
The source of inspiration for the design of the chambered long barrows remains unclear. Suggestions that have proved popular among archaeologists is that they were inspired either by natural rock formations or by the shape of wooden houses. It has been suggested that their design was based on the wooden long houses found in central Europe during the Early Neolithic, however there is a gap of seven centuries between the last known long houses and the first known chambered long barrows.

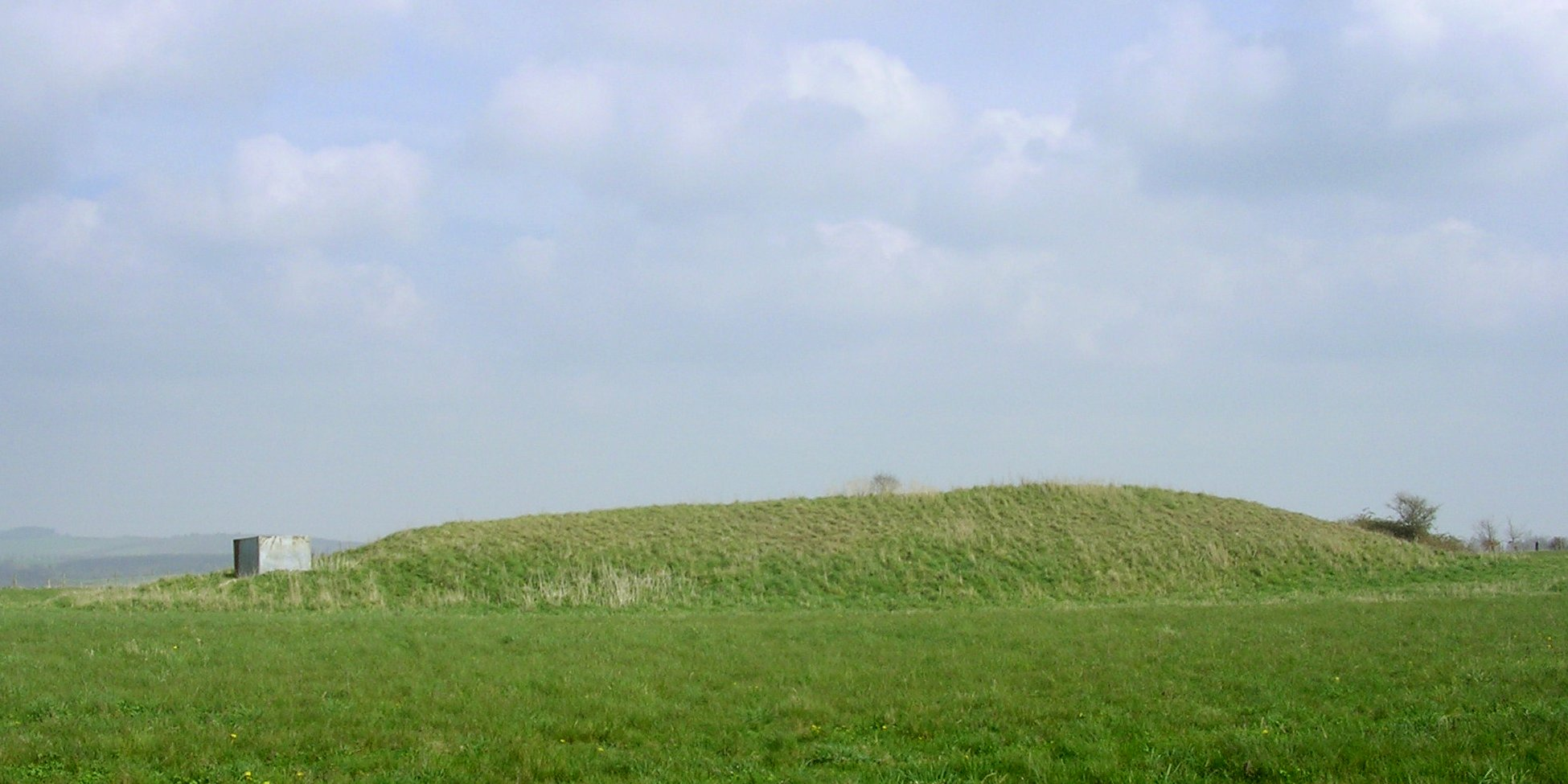
A well-preserved earthen long barrow on Gussage Down in the Cranborne Chase area of Dorset

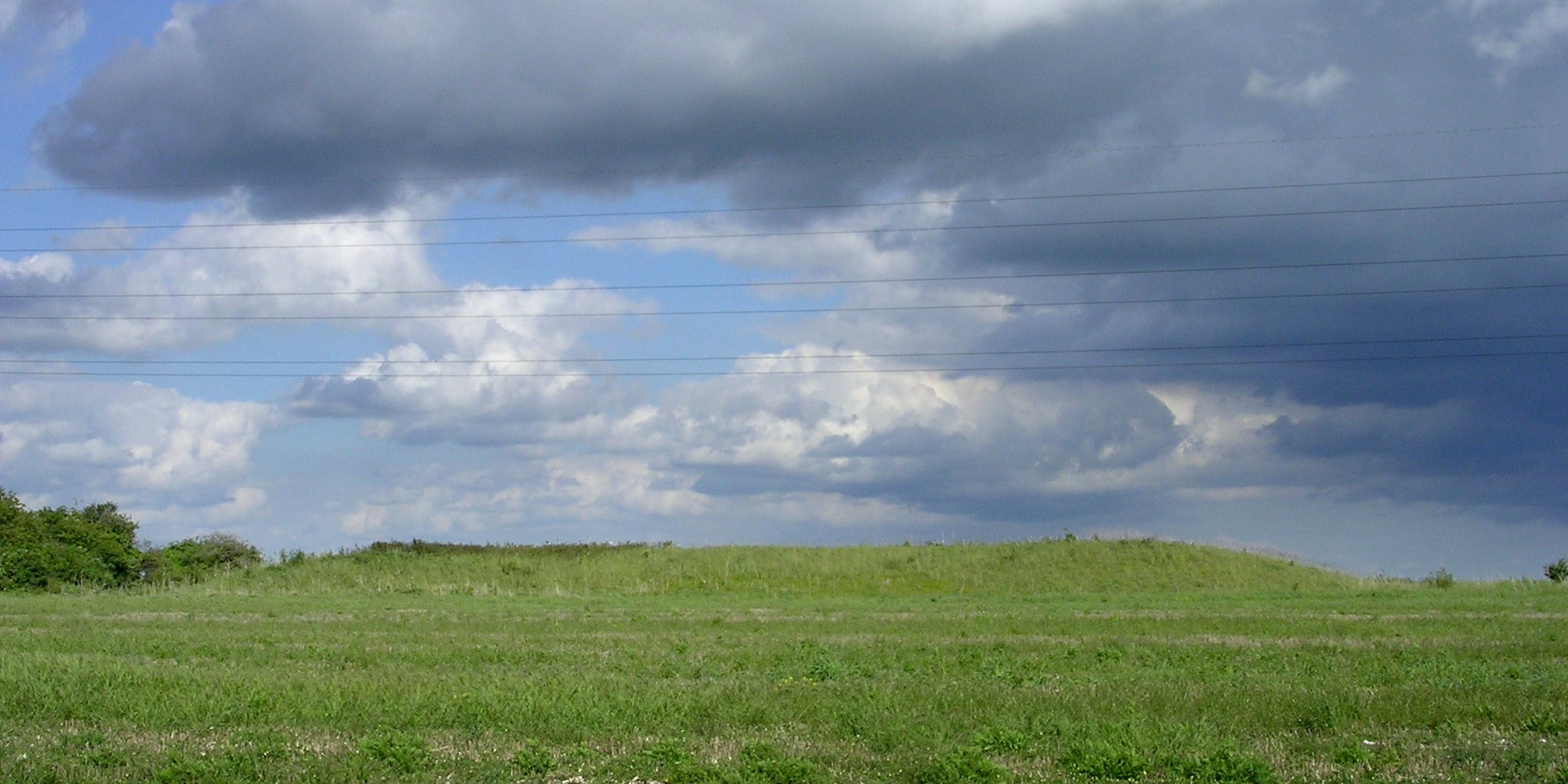
Grans Barrow on Toyd Down, Hampshire. The long barrow mound is 60 metres long, 20 metres wide and over 2 metres high.

Examples of ancient long barrows in England

=== Religious sites ===
According to one possible explanation, the long barrows served as markers of place that were connected to Early Neolithic ideas about cosmology and spirituality, and accordingly were centres of ritual activity mediated by the dead. The inclusion of human remains has been used to argue that these long barrows were involved in a form of ancestor veneration. Malone suggests that the prominence of these barrows indicates that ancestors were deemed far more important to Early Neolithic people than their Mesolithic forebears. In the early 20th century, this interpretation of the long barrows as religious sites was often connected to the idea that they were the holy sites of a new religion spread by either settlers or missionaries. This explanation has been less popular with archaeologists since the 1970s.

Adopting an approach based in cognitive archaeology, Lewis-Williams and Pearce argue that the chambered long barrows "reflected and at the same time constituted... a culturally specific expression of the neurologically generated tiered cosmos", a cosmos mediated by a system of symbols. They suggest that the entrances to the chambers were viewed as transitional zones where sacrificial rituals took place, and that they were possibly spaces for the transformation of the dead using fire.

=== Territorial markers ===
Another explanation is that these long barrows were intrinsically connected to the transition to farming, representing a new way of looking at the land. In this interpretation, the long barrows served as territorial markers, dividing up the land, signifying that it was occupied and controlled by a particular community, and thus warning away rival groups. In defending this interpretation, Malone noted that each "tomb-territory" typically had access to a range of soils and landscape types in its vicinity, suggesting that it could have represented a viable territorial area for a particular community. The distribution of chambered long barrows on some Scottish islands shows patterns that closely mirror modern land divisions between farms and crofts. This interpretation also draws ethnographic parallels from recorded communities around the world, who have also used monuments to demarcate territory.

This idea became popular among archaeologists in the 1980s and 1990s, and—in downplaying religion while emphasising an economic explanation for these monuments—it was influenced by Marxist ideas then popular in the European archaeological establishment. In the early 21st century, archaeologists began to challenge this idea, as evidence emerged that much of Early Neolithic Britain was forested and its inhabitants were likely pastoralists rather than agriculturalists. Accordingly, communities in Britain would have been semi-nomadic, with little need for territorial demarcation or clear markings of land ownership. Also, this explanation fails to explain why the chambered long barrows should be clustered in certain areas rather than being evenly distributed throughout the landscape.

== Later history ==
Many of the chambered long barrows have not remained intact, having been damaged and broken up during the millennia. In some cases, most of the chamber has been removed, leaving only the three-stone dolmen.

=== Iron Age and Roman use ===
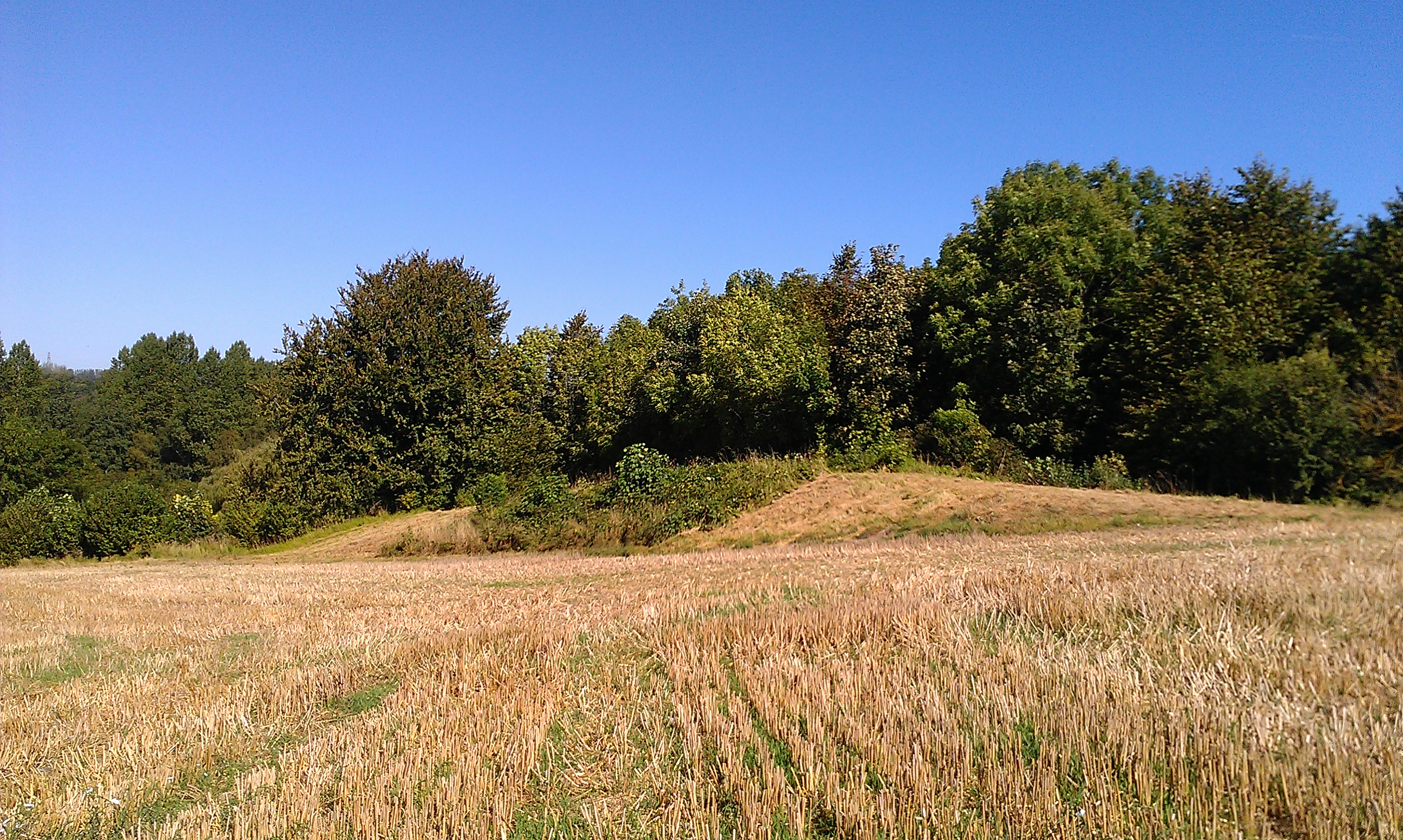
Julliberrie's Grave in Kent is an unchambered long barrow that saw various inhumation burials and a coin hoard placed around it during the Roman period

During the first half of the 1st millennium BCE, many British long barrows saw renewed human activity. At Julliberrie's Grave in Kent, southeast England, three inhumations were buried at the southern edge of the ditch around the long barrow. The barrow at Wayland's Smithy in Oxfordshire, also in southeast England, saw a cemetery established around the long barrow, with at least 46 skeletons buried in 42 graves, many having been decapitated. Seventeen Romano-British burials were discovered at Wor Barrow in Dorset, eight of which were missing their heads.

The deposition of coins around long barrows also appears to have been quite common in Roman Britain, and these may have been placed by these monuments as offerings. A hoard of Constantinian coins was for instance placed in a pot around Julliberrie's Grave. A solitary coin from the reign of Allectus was found in the ditch around the long barrow at Skendleby I.

=== Antiquarian and archaeological investigation ===
The first serious study of chambered long barrows took place in the 16th and 17th centuries, when the mounds that covered chambers were removed by agriculture. By the 19th century, antiquarians and archaeologists had come to recognise this style of monument as a form of tomb. In the late 19th and early 20th centuries, archaeologists like V. Gordon Childe held to the cultural diffusionist view that such Western European monuments had been based on tombs originally produced in parts of the eastern Mediterranean region, suggesting that their ultimate origin was either in Egypt or in Crete. In this view, the tradition was seen as having spread westward as part of some form of "megalithic religion".

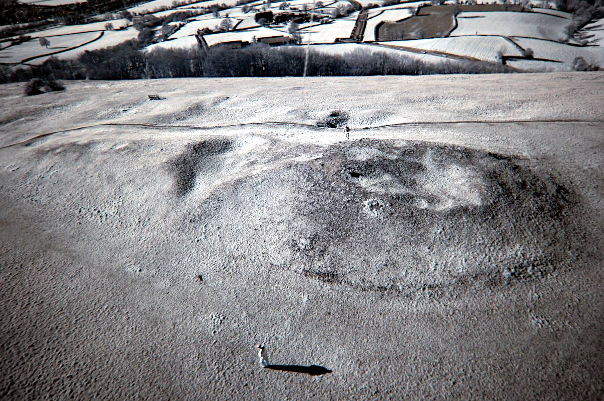
An aerial photograph of the Selsey Long Barrow in Gloucestershire, southwest England

A seminal study of the long barrows authored by Welsh archaeologist Glyn Daniel was published in 1958 as The Megalith Builders of Western Europe. In 1950, Daniel states that about a tenth of known chambered long barrows in Britain had been excavated, while regional field studies helped to list them. Few of the earlier excavations recorded or retained any human remains found in the chamber. From the 1960s onward, archaeological research increasingly focused on examining regional groups of long barrows rather than the wider architectural tradition. The meticulous excavation of various long barrows led to the widespread recognition that long barrows were often multi-phase monuments which had been changed over time. Up until the 1970s, archaeologists widely believed that the long barrows of Western Europe were based on Near Eastern models.

Archaeological investigation of long barrows has been hindered by the misidentification of other features. Long barrows have been confused with coniger mounds and rabbit warrens, sometimes termed pillow mounds, which can take on a similar shape. Rifle butts can also sometimes take on shapes similar to those of long barrows. Later landscaping has also led to misidentification; the two mounds at Stoke Park in Bristol, south-west England were for instance thought to be long barrows until an excavation in the 1950s revealed that they post-dated the Middle Ages, and thus must have been created by more recent landscaping projects. In areas which were previously impacted by glaciation, moraine deposits on valley floors have sometimes been mistaken for long barrows. At Dunham New Park in Cheshire, northwest England, for instance, a mound was initially believed to be a long barrow and only later assessed as a natural feature. Damage sustained by Neolithic long barrows can also lead to them being mistaken for other types of monuments, such as the oval barrows and round barrows which are usually of later date. Aerial photography has proven useful in identifying many more examples that are barely visible on the ground. Geophysical surveys have been found to be helpful to explore sites that are unavailable for excavation.

=== Recent activity ===
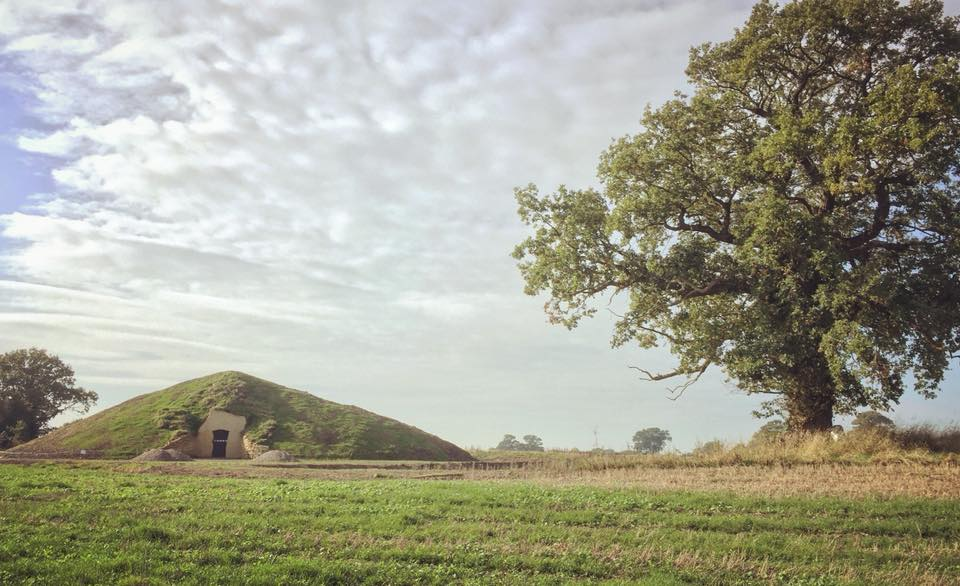
The modern Soulton Long Barrow

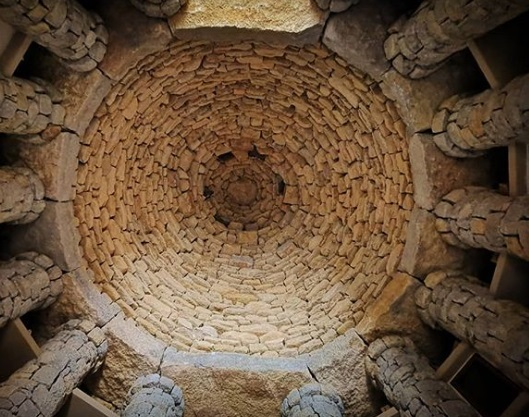
Inside one of the Chambers of the barrow

Images of the modern barrows

Long barrows such as West Kennet Long Barrow in Wiltshire have become tourist attractions. At Wayland's Smithy in Oxfordshire, visitors have lodged coins into cracks in the site's stones since at least the 1960s, while at the Coldrum Long Barrow in Kent, a rag tree has been established overhanging the barrow.

Many modern pagans view West Kennet Long Barrow as a "temple" and use it for their rituals. Some see it as a place of the ancestors where they can engage in "vision quests" and other neo-shamanic practices. Others have seen it as a womb of the Great Goddess, and as a sort of living entity. The winter solstice has been a particularly popular occasion for pagans to visit.

In 2015 the first long barrow in thousands of years, the Long Barrow at All Cannings, inspired by those built in the Neolithic era, was built on land just outside the village of All Cannings in Wiltshire. This was followed soon after by others, such as Soulton Long Barrow near Wem, Shropshire.
