= Audrey Henshall =

British archaeologist (1927–2021)

Audrey Shore Henshall OBE FSA HonFSAScot
- Born: 1927; Oldham, Lancashire, England
- Died: 14 December 2021 (aged 94); Edinburgh, Scotland
- Education: University of Edinburgh
- Occupation: Archaeologist
- Known for: Expert on Scottish chambered cairns

Audrey Shore Henshall OBE FSA FSA Scot (1927 – 14 December 2021) was a British archaeologist known for her work on Scottish chambered cairns, prehistoric pottery and early textiles.

== Life and work ==
Henshall was born in Oldham, Lancashire, in 1927. After leaving school, she moved to Scotland to study archaeology at University of Edinburgh under Stuart Piggott, graduating with an MA in 1949. She remained in Edinburgh for the rest of her life. In 1952, Audrey was appointed as an Assistant Curator at the National Museum of Antiquities of Scotland, now the National Museum of Scotland. From 1960 to 1971 she was the Assistant Keeper of Archaeology at the National Museum of Antiquities of Scotland. She was appointed Assistant Secretary of the Society of Antiquaries of Scotland in 1970. Audrey underpinned the Society's efforts in establishing the Archaeological Field Survey Team, the Urban Excavation Unit, and the Aberdeen Archaeology Unit. Following her retirement in 1986, she was awarded for her years of service by being elected an Honorary Fellow in 1987. She was also a fellow of the London Society of Antiquaries. In 1992 a Festschrift was published in her honour and in that same year she received an OBE "for services to archaeology". She has been called "a leading authority in a number of fields in early archaeology". She was awarded the Dorothy Marshall Medal by the Society of Antiquaries of Scotland in 2016 for her outstanding voluntary contribution to Scottish archaeological or related work. Henshall died in Edinburgh on 14 December 2021, at the age of 94.

=== Chambered cairns ===
Shortly after Henshall graduated with an MA from the University of Edinburgh, she returned to the Department of Archaeology, having been appointed a Research Fellow under the direction of Stuart Piggott. He proposed she should study Neolithic burial monuments, and by 1951, she had begun work on her pioneering study of Scottish chambered cairns, titled The Chambered Tombs of Scotland, 1963 and 1972. They were well received by reviewers with comments like "grand result... scholarly work of science and art", and together regarded as a "classic work of reference for the subject". These were followed by four co-authored books about chambered cairns in specific parts of northern Scotland. Between 1989 and 2001, Henshall produced four regional volumes revising her earlier works and adding numerous newly identified tombs to the ever-growing list of monuments.

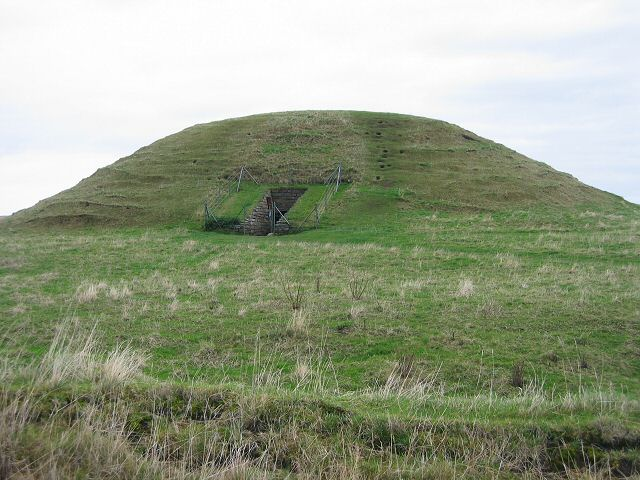
This cairn at Maes Howe gave its name to a "regional group of developed passage graves defined by Audrey Henshall".

- The chambered tombs of Scotland. Vol. 1, Edinburgh University Press 1963
- The chambered tombs of Scotland. Vol. 2, Edinburgh University Press 1972
- The chambered cairns of Orkney: an inventory of the structures and their contents, with J.L. Davidson, Edinburgh University Press, 1989
- The chambered cairns of Caithness: an inventory of the structures and their contents, with J.L. Davidson, Edinburgh University Press, 1991
- The chambered cairns of Sutherland: an inventory of the structures and their contents, with J.N.G. Ritchie. Edinburgh University Press 1995
- The chambered cairns of the Central Highlands: an inventory of the structures and their contents, with J.N.G. Ritchie. Edinburgh University Press 2001

Henshall also published:

- A Long Cist Cemetery at Parkburn Sand Pit, Lasswade, Midlothian. Proceedings of the Society of Antiquaries of Scotland; 89, 1958
- Notes: (4) A Dagger Grave from the Law of Mauldslie, Carluke, Lanarkshire. Proceedings of the Society of Antiquaries of Scotland; 95, 1964
- The Excavation of a Chambered Cairn at Embo, Sutherland with J C Wallace. Proceedings of the Society of Antiquaries of Scotland; 96, 1965
- Notes: (6) The Jet Necklace Found at Greenhowe, Pluscarden Moray. Proceedings of the Society of Antiquaries of Scotland; 98, 1967
- Scottish chambered tombs and long mounds. In Renfrew, Colin, British Prehistory, Duckworth, 1974

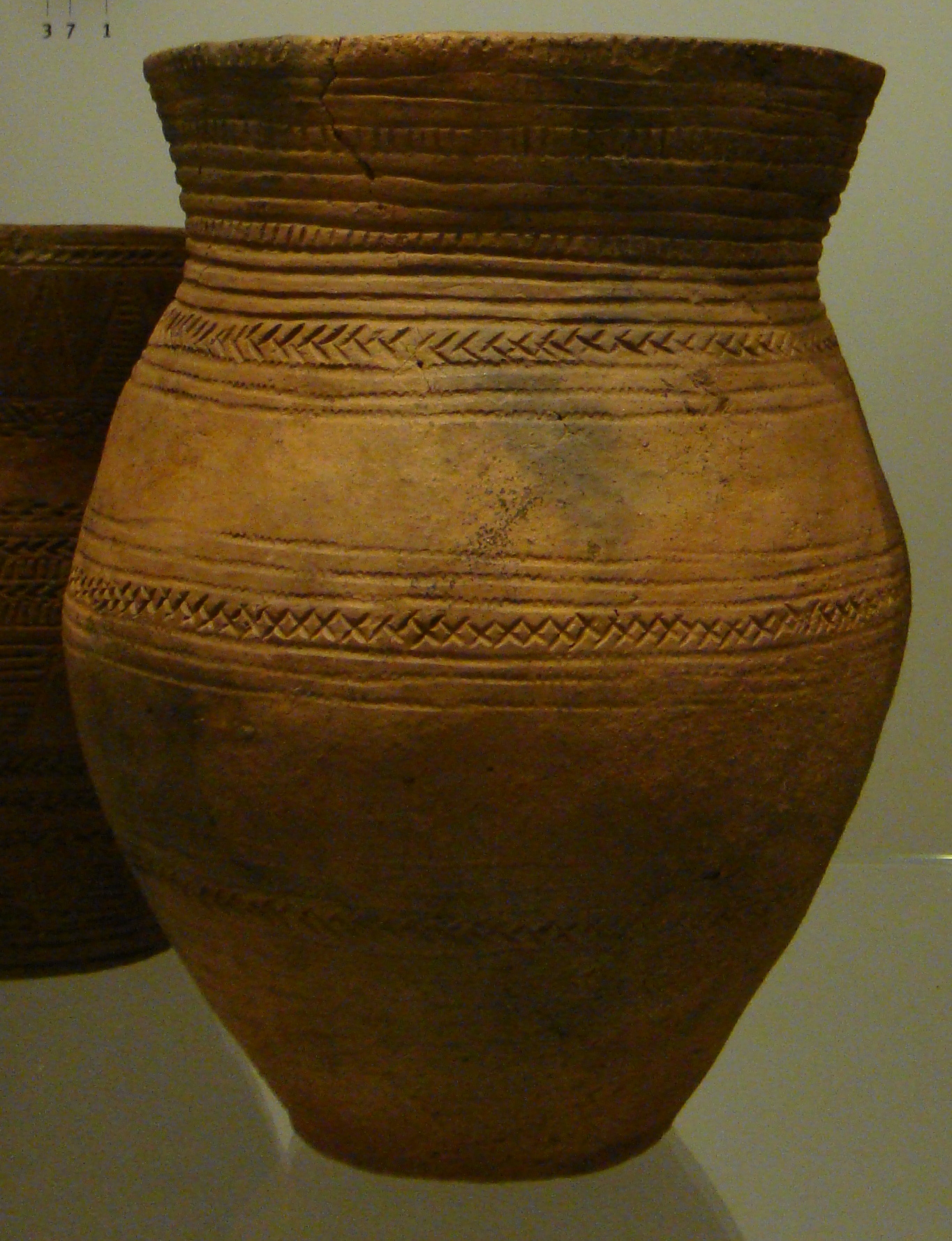
Neolithic pottery, found in Bathgate.

=== Prehistoric pottery ===
Henshall was knowledgeable about prehistoric pottery, which was found amongst the grave goods in the tombs, and described in the books on chambered cairns. One writer considers her "major contributions" have been "in the fields of funerary and ceramic studies". Some of her articles on pottery can be found in the Proceedings of the Society of Antiquaries of Scotland, for example, articles on:

- Notes: (1) Neolithic Sherds from Dalkeith (vol.98)
- Notes: (4) A Food Vessel and Part of a Jet Necklace from Ardfin Forest, Jura, Argyll. (vol.98)
- Notes: (5) A Food-Vessel from Carsegour Farm, Kinross (vol.98)
- Notes: (1) Three Beakers from Cawdor Area, Nairnshire (vol.99)

=== Early textiles ===
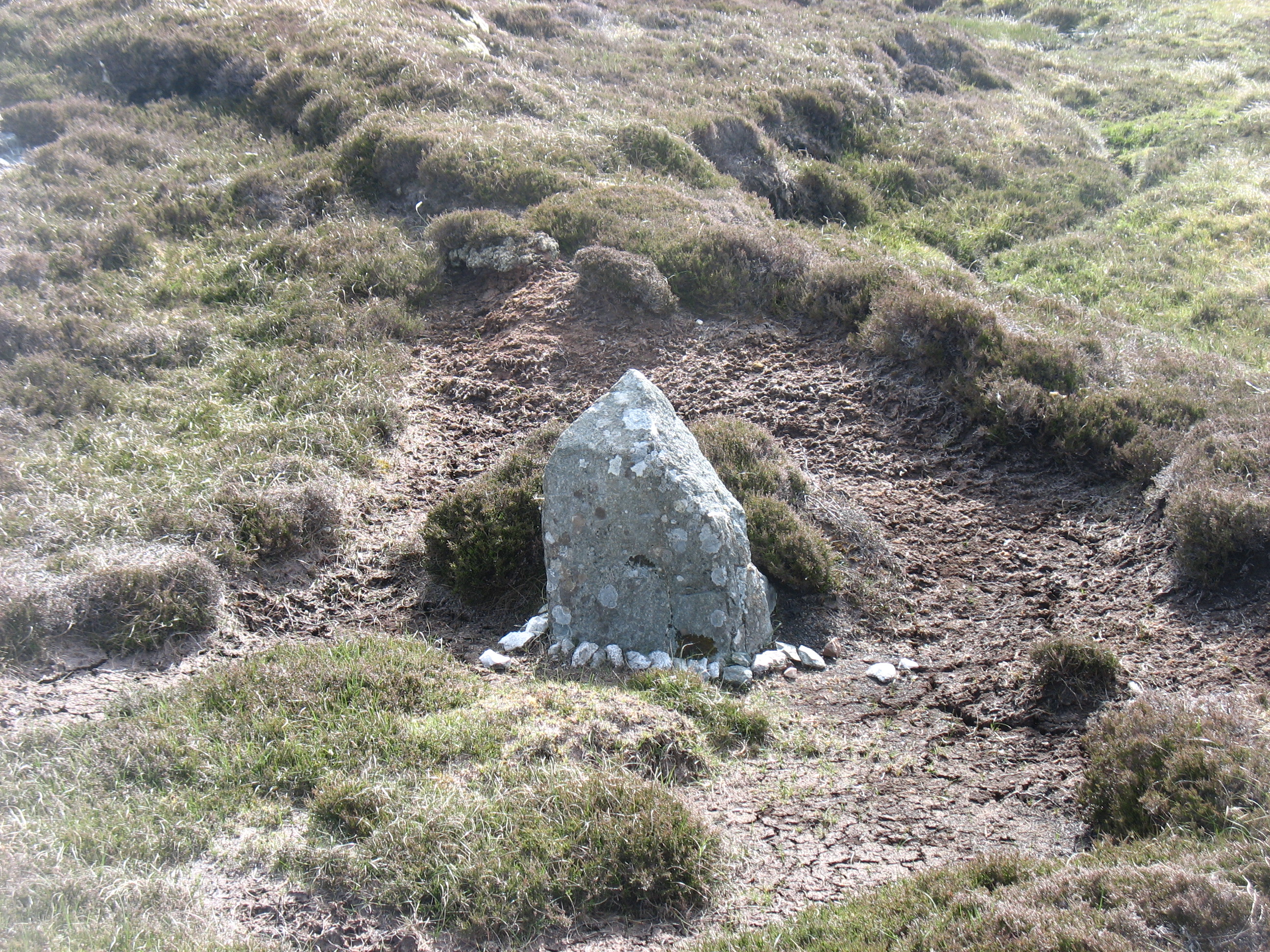
Gunnister Man's Grave

While working as Assistant Curator at the National Museum of Antiquities of Scotland, Audrey developed an interest in prehistoric and later textiles. Much of her work on textiles was published in the 1950s and 1960s. In this she was encouraged by the expert Grace Crowfoot with whom she co-authored several articles. Her work on the Gunnister Man's 300-year-old clothing found in a peat bog in Shetland attracted wide interest as did her identification of colours used in centuries-old textiles. The tartan pattern discovered at Dungiven led to the revival of "an authentic early 17th century tartan". Descriptions of early textiles and clothing designs arising from her forensic examination have been said to be amongst her "most fascinating work".

- Note on an early stocking in "sprang" technique found near Micklegate Bar, York, Yorkshire Philosophical Society 1951
- Clothing and other articles from a late 17th-century grave at Gunnister, Shetland, with Stuart Maxwell, 1954
- Early Textiles Found in Scotland. Part I: Locally Made. Proceedings of the Society of Antiquaries of Scotland; 86, 1954
- Early textiles Found in Scotland. Part II Medieval Imports with Grace M Crowfoot and John Beckworth. Proceedings of the Society of Antiquaries of Scotland; 88, 1956
- The Dungiven costume: (a study of 17th century native dress in Ulster) with Wilfred Seaby. With contributions by A.T. Lucas, A.G. Smith and A. Connor. Ulster Journal of Archaeology. vols. 24–25 (1961–62)
- Five tablet-woven seal tags, Royal Archaeological Institute 1965

More of her articles on textiles can be found in the Proceedings of the Society of Antiquaries of Scotland, for example:

- Early Textiles Found in Scotland. Part I: Locally Made (vol. 86)
- Early textiles Found in Scotland. Part II Medieval Imports with Grace M Crowfoot and John Beckworth (vol.88)
- A Long Cist Cemetery at Parkburn Sand Pit, Lasswade, Midlothian (vol.89)
- The Excavation of a Chambered Cairn at Embo, Sutherland with J C Wallace. Proceedings of the Society of Antiquaries of Scotland (vol.96)
- Clothing Found at Huntsgarth, Orkney (Vol. 101)
