= Falkner's Circle =

Neolithic stone circle in Wiltshire, England

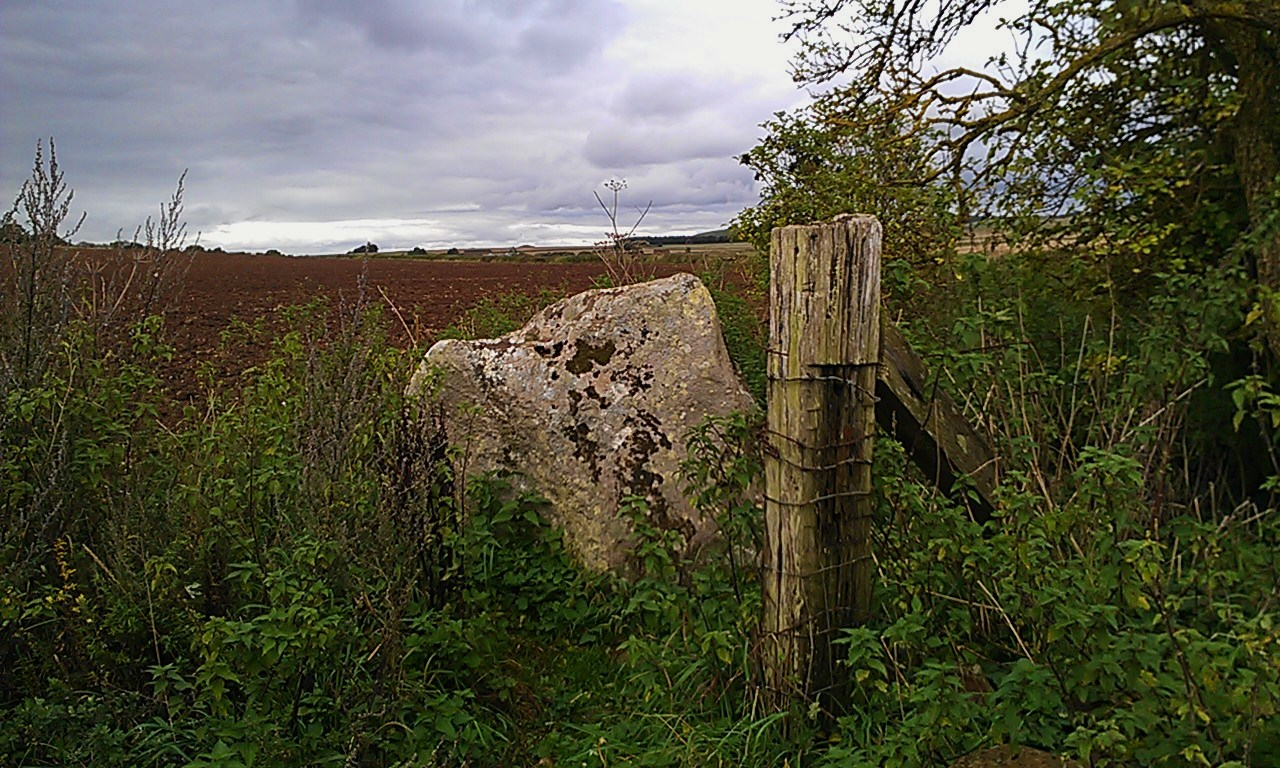
- The sole surviving stone from Falkner's Circle

- Location within Wiltshire
- 51°25′22″N 1°50′37″W
- Type: Stone circle
- Periods: Neolithic / Bronze Age
- Location: Avebury, Wiltshire, England

Falkner's Circle was a stone circle near the village of Avebury in the south-western English county of Wiltshire. Built from twelve sarsen megaliths, it measured about 37 metres (121 ft) in diameter, although only one of these stones remains standing.

The ring was part of a tradition of stone circle construction that spread throughout much of Britain, Ireland, and Brittany during the Late Neolithic and Early Bronze Age, over a period between 3300 and 900 BCE. The purpose of such monuments is unknown, although archaeologists speculate that the stones represented supernatural entities for the circle's builders.

Positioned in a dry valley, the circle was erected on the southern end of a field that contained a range of natural sarsens. It is possible that the megaliths were erected very close to where they were naturally found. The site had previously seen human activity in the Mesolithic period and may have been symbolically meaningful for local communities for a long time before the circle was created. The ring was located close to other Late Neolithic and Early Bronze Age monuments, such as the West Kennet Avenue and Avebury stone circle, although its precise relationship to these is unclear. Extensive flint knapping took place at the site during the Late Neolithic or Early Bronze Age.

Archaeological evidence indicates that in the Iron Age, a hearth was placed on the site, and in the post-medieval period a number of the stones were toppled and destroyed through burning. Most of the stones in the circle were lying prone on the ground by the seventeenth century, which might explain why it was left undiscovered by antiquarians exploring the area in that period, like John Aubrey and William Stukeley. The earliest known report of the site came from a Mr Falkner, who discovered it in 1840 while riding in the area. Due to the intensification of agriculture, all the prone stones were removed—thus destroying the circle—in either the late nineteenth or twentieth century. The site was excavated in 2002 in an archaeological project led by Mark Gillings and Joshua Pollard.

== Location ==
Falkner's Circle is 750m south-east of Avebury, at the bottom of a dry valley that runs from Avebury to West Kennett. The archaeologist Aubrey Burl described the site as being "very close" to the Avebury henge and stone circle monument. It thus forms part of the "Stonehenge, Avebury and Associated Sites" UNESCO World Heritage Site. The remaining stone from the circle is also a scheduled monument under the Ancient Monuments and Archaeological Areas Act 1979.

== Context ==
While the transition from the Early Neolithic to the Late Neolithic in the fourth and third millennia BCE saw much economic and technological continuity, there was a considerable change in the style of monuments erected, particularly in what is now southern and eastern England. By 3000 BCE, the long barrows, causewayed enclosures, and cursuses that had predominated in the Early Neolithic were no longer built, and had been replaced by circular monuments of various kinds. These include earthen henges, timber circles, and stone circles. Stone circles are found in most areas of Britain where stone is available, with the exception of the island's south-eastern corner. They are most densely concentrated in south-western Britain and on the north-eastern horn of Scotland, near Aberdeen. The tradition of their construction may have lasted for 2,400 years, from 3300 to 900 BCE, with the major phase of building taking place between 3000 and 1,300 BCE.

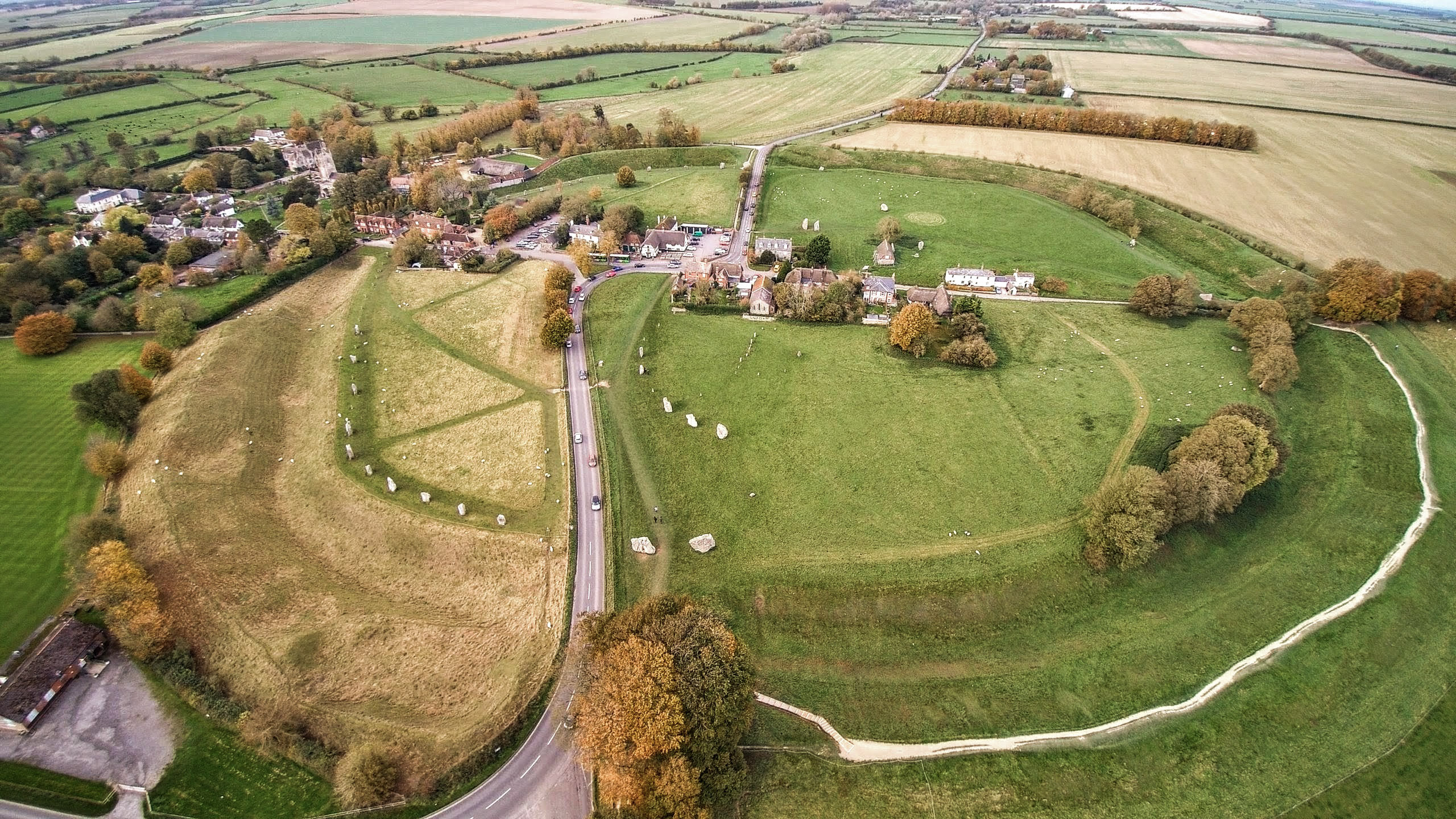
Falkner's Circle is near the Avebury stone circle (pictured), the largest known example of such a structure

These stone circles typically show very little evidence of human visitation during the period immediately following their creation. This suggests that they were not sites used for rituals that left archaeologically visible evidence, but may have been deliberately left as "silent and empty monuments". The archaeologist Mike Parker Pearson suggests that in Neolithic Britain, stone was associated with the dead, and wood with the living. Other archaeologists have suggested that the stone might not represent ancestors, but rather other supernatural entities, such as deities.

In the area of modern Wiltshire, various stone circles were erected, the best known of which are Avebury and Stonehenge. All of the other examples are ruined, and in some cases have been destroyed. As Burl noted, these examples have left behind "only frustrating descriptions and vague positions". Most of the known Wiltshire examples were erected on low-lying positions in the landscape. There are four smaller stone circles known from the area surrounding Avebury: The Sanctuary on Overton Hill, Winterbourne Bassett Stone Circle, Clatford Stone Circle, and Falkner's Circle. Archaeologists initially suggested that a fifth example could be seen at Langdean Bottom near the village of West Overton, although further investigation has reinterpreted this as evidence for a late prehistoric hut circle or a medieval feature. Burl suggested that these smaller circles related to Avebury in a manner akin to "village churches within the diocese of a cathedral".

== Description ==
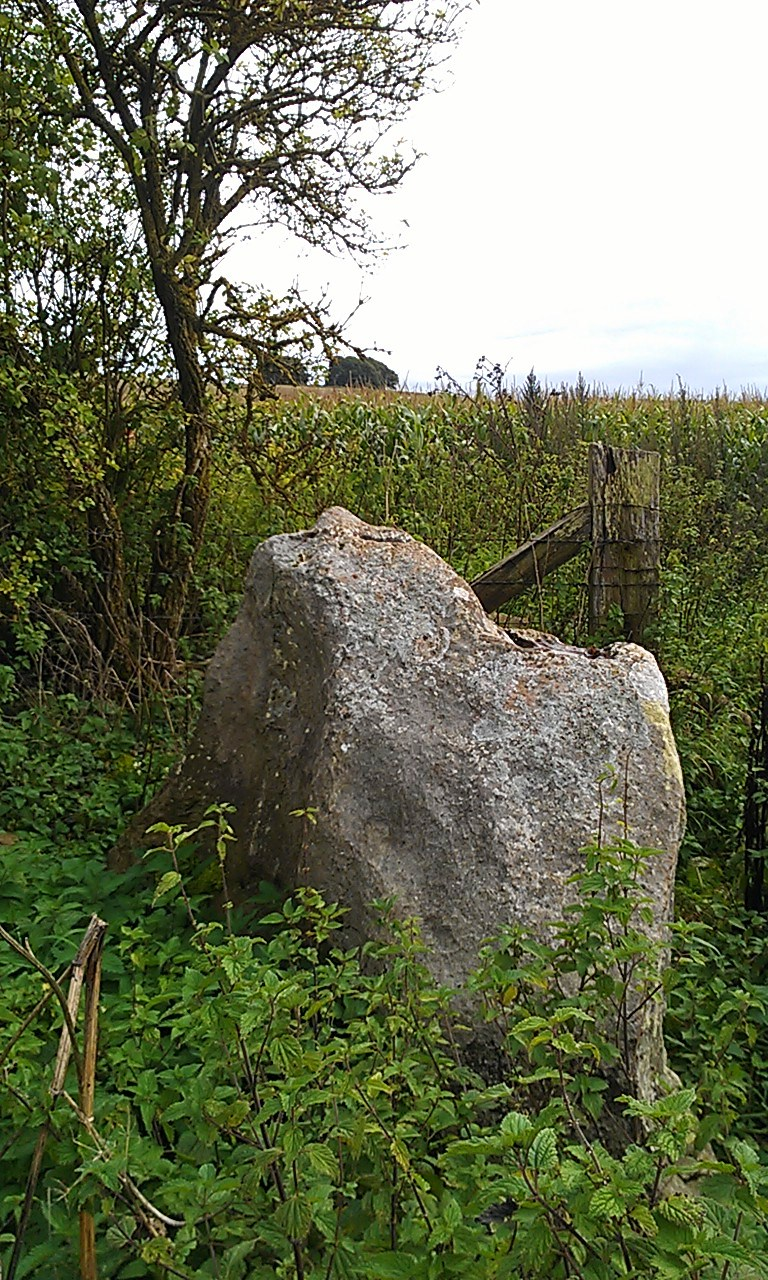
The sole surviving stone from Falkner's Circle

Falkner's Circle consisted of twelve stones, arranged in a circle with a diameter of 36.6m. Only one of these survives, the others having been destroyed due to the 20th-century expansion of intensive farming in the area. This stone has been incorporated into a hedge line, 250m east of the West Kennet Avenue. The surviving standing stone measures 1.28m high from ground level, with a maximum basal width of 2.10m. It is likely to stretch for at least another 0.5m below the ground surface, meaning that the stone is probably 2m in total length. Its long axis is aligned on an east to west direction. The stone is covered in extensive lichen growth and the top has several natural depressions.

The grey sarsen stones used at Falkner's Circle were of the type used in the Avebury stone circle and in the two avenues (West Kennet and Beckhampton) connected to it. Falkner's Circle is at the southern end of a natural scatter of sarsen stones; this scatter was recorded by the antiquarian William Stukeley in the 18th century, although they were later removed by farmers. Because of this location on the edge of the sarsen scatter, the archaeologist Mark Gillings and his team proposed that the circle's builders may have understood this as a "liminal" space that was worthy of monumentalisation. If this is the case, Gillings et al. argued, Falkner's Circle might have constituted "a monument to stones as opposed to one for people". It is possible that Falkner's Circle was created by erecting stones in the location where they were naturally found. In this scenario, Gillings et al. noted, it might have represented a "hybrid construction" that blurred the division between "nature" and "culture".

Excavations carried out at the site in 2002 revealed several worked flints of Mesolithic ("Middle Stone Age") type at the site, including one microlith and a broken tranchet axe. Gillings et al. suggested that these Mesolithic flints, which are uncommon in the region, may indicate that this specific location had "an enduring historical/mythological significance" for people from the Mesolithic right through to the Neolithic.

Falkner's Circle shares various characteristics with the Clatford Stone Circle in that both contained comparatively few stones, were built in valleys, and had a diameter akin to that of the outer ring of The Sanctuary. Unlike The Sanctuary, Falkner's Circle did not consist of a timber circle later replaced by a stone one. The relationship between Falkner's Circle and other aspects of the built prehistoric landscape around Avebury is not clear. Although it is inter-visible with a large stretch of the West Kennet Avenue, it does not directly connect to the latter. From Falkner's Circle, it is not possible to see the Avebury henge and stone circles, due to the gentle rise of the land to the north of it. Compared to many other built structures in the area, such as the Avebury henge, Silbury Hill, and West Kennet Avenue, it is diminutive. Gillings et al. thus suggested that its significance for local people might have been fleeting.

The Falkner's Circle may have served as a shrine for a single family or kin-group, marked a holy place within the landscape, or simply memorialised an important, even mythological, event that was deemed to have taken place there.

— Gillings et al, 2008

Based on his observations in the 1840s, the antiquarian Mr Falkner suggested that there had once been twelve stones in the circle. The 2002 excavation at the site discovered five pits cut into the chalky gravel, which lay on an arc with a diameter of about 44m, spaced between 13 and 17m apart. All were associated with pieces of fragmented, burnt sarsen. Projecting this arc into a circle, and considering the location of the five known stone holes, would suggest that – if the stones were evenly spaced – there would have been ten megaliths in the circle, not twelve, as Falkner had claimed. From other surviving examples of stone circles it is nevertheless known that the stones are not always spaced at even intervals throughout the whole circle, indicating that the ring could have once contained twelve megaliths.

That excavation also recovered 1074 pieces of worked flint, much of it from the topsoil. The majority of this was flake debitage of Late Neolithic or Early Bronze Age character, and suggested that flint knapping had taken place at that location. Three sherds of Grooved Ware were also recovered from the site, two of which belonged to the same vessel. Gillings et al. believed that Falkner's Circle was probably erected in the late third or early second millennia BCE.

== Later history ==
=== Iron Age and Post-Medieval activity ===
The 2002 excavation also revealed a pit at the site of Falkner's Circle that contained both sarsen fragments, which showed evidence of having fragmented under exposure to heat, and a number of carbonised seeds. These were radiocarbon dated, revealing a date between 410-340 BCE and 310-200 BCE (95.4% probability), placing this pit in the Middle Iron Age. The pit was likely a hearth base. A spread of fire-reddened clay and charcoal flecking, covering an area of circa 10m by 4m, was interpreted as having been produced in the post-medieval period during the burning and destruction of some of the stones. Excavation also revealed more recent animal burrows in the area of the circle, one of which contained the remains of at least two chickens.

=== Antiquarian and archaeological research ===
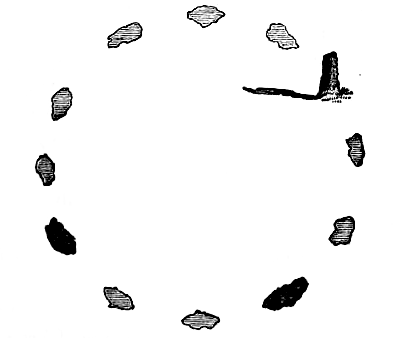
Falkner's illustration of the circle, first published in 1858

Falkner's Circle was not described by the various seventeenth- and eighteenth-century antiquarians who explored and recorded the prehistoric monuments around Avebury, such as John Aubrey, Stukeley, and Colt Hoare. This was likely because the circle was at this point largely hidden, with all but one of the stones lying prone and the standing example concealed within the adjacent hedgerow.

The earliest known account of the site came from 1840, when a Mr Falkner of Devizes wrote an account of having come upon the circle while out riding. His account was not published at the time, but was included in an 1858 publication by William Long. In that report, Falkner was quoted as saying that alongside the standing stone, he had discovered two stones lying on the ground and nine hollow places. He rejected the idea that there had once been a tumulus in the centre of the circle, stating that the ground was quite flat in that location.

Falkner's Circle was then included in an 1884 archaeological map of the area by the Reverend A. C. Smith, suggesting that it was still extant at that time. Smith related coming upon the site in the late 1870s, after which he began to investigate with Long's assistance. He probed the earth around the standing stone and then removed the turf wherever he encountered a submerged stone. In doing so, he found 22 sarsen stones, all of them of small size, believing that they had once formed parts of the stones in the circle. He related that while "the northern, southern and eastern segments are tolerably well-defined" by this sarsen scatter, he could "find scarcely a single stone on what should be the western segment to complete the circle".

In August and September 2002, the archaeologists Mark Gillings, Joshua Pollard, David Wheatley, and Rick Peterson led a four-week archaeological investigation of the circle, as part of which they carried out both geophysical examination and excavation. They cut two trenches into the site, one measuring 40m by 10m and the other 5m by 5m. They concluded that the evidence that they found supported Falkner's claims of a stone circle on the site, although acknowledged that "alternative readings of the evidence are possible".
