= Coneybury Anomaly =

Cross-cultural feasting site in Wiltshire, England

- Map showing the Coneybury Anomaly within the Stonehenge section of the Stonehenge and Avebury World Heritage Site
- Interactive map of Coneybury Anomaly
- 51.1735°N 1.8093°W
- Type: Pit
- Periods: Mesolithic / Neolithic
- Location: Near Amesbury, Wiltshire, England
- OS grid reference: SU13424160

UNESCO World Heritage Site
- Designated: 1986
- Reference no.: 373

The Coneybury Anomaly is a pit with animal and other refuse, interpreted as the remains of a cross-cultural feast, within the Stonehenge Landscape in Wiltshire, England. It was not apparent on the ground and was discovered in the 20th century by geophysical survey. Excavation has produced a large amount of early Neolithic pottery together with a large quantity of animal bone, and flint tools of both Mesolithic and Neolithic types.

== Location ==
The Coneybury Anomaly is around 1.4 kilometres east-by-southeast of the Stonehenge monument, which can be seen from the site. There are extensive views south-east across the Avon valley, and west towards Normanton Down. The pit is not obvious on the ground and was discovered as a geophysical anomaly (hence the name) as part of the excavations of the Coneybury Henge, which is some 12 metres south-west of the Anomaly.

== The finds ==
The Anomaly is a pit containing a large amount of early Neolithic pottery together with a large quantity of animal bone, and flint tools of both Mesolithic and Neolithic types. The bones included at least ten cattle, plus several roe deer, two red deer and a pig. The material was radiocarbon dated to 3980–3708 BCE, before the henge was constructed and within three centuries of the introduction of Neolithic technology to Britain.

=== Ceramics ===
The ceramic assemblage included bowls and cups, all of rather similar manufacture. Many of the fragments were large, indicating that they had not been trampled after they were discarded, and thus that a single, relatively short event led to the Anomaly.

=== Butchered cattle and deer ===
The cattle were not butchered in the same way as the roe deer; most limbs of the cattle are absent – possibly redistributed among participants – while the deer bones remained in the pit. Isotope ratios in the bones indicated that all the animals came from within 20 km of Coneybury. They included at least three groups of cattle, each from a different place and comprising individuals of several ages, while the deer all came from the immediate surroundings. The cattle were all female and had grazed on open ground; they had not eaten straw from manured cereal plots.

=== Neolithic and Mesolithic tools ===
The primary pit fill includes both Neolithic and Mesolithic tool types. There is no obvious source from which residual Mesolithic material could be derived, and no evidence of differential weathering. The blades/blade-lets must therefore be part of the event that caused the Anomaly. This intimate mixture of Neolithic and Mesolithic tools is unique, and seems to indicate a single event attended by two different cultural groups.

== Interpretation: a cross-cultural feast ==
The excavators suggest that the Coneybury Anomaly represents the material remains of a single gathering organized by a regional community, with participants from several areas. One group of attendees provided deer instead of, or in addition to, cattle. This group may have been hunter-gatherers who lived alongside farmers, engaging with them in a solidarity feast which required equivalent contributions from participants and promoted community cohesion. If this is correct, the regional feasts that have been suggested for the later causewayed enclosures were already taking place in the earliest Neolithic phase, albeit on a smaller geographical scale.
