= West Overton =

Village in Wiltshire, England

Coordinates: 51.411°N 1.812°W

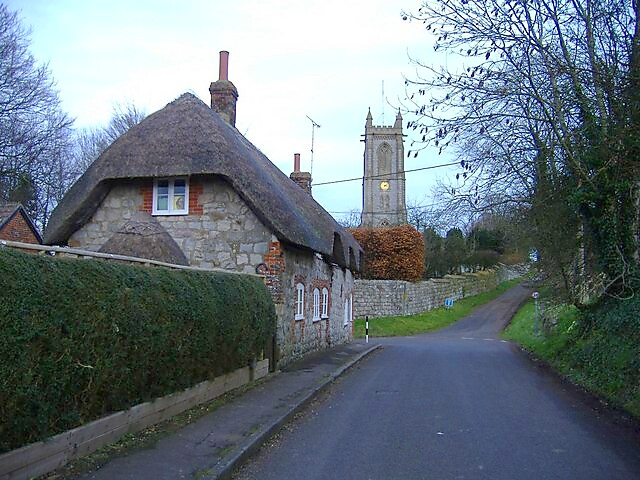
- Cottage and church tower, West Overton

- Location within Wiltshire
- Population: 637 in (2011)
- OS grid reference: SU132680
- Unitary authority: Wiltshire
- Ceremonial county: Wiltshire
- Region: South West
- Country: England
- Sovereign state: United Kingdom
- Post town: Marlborough
- Postcode district: SN8
- Dialling code: 01672
- Police: Wiltshire
- Fire: Dorset and Wiltshire
- Ambulance: South Western
- UK Parliament: East Wiltshire
- Website: Parish Council

West Overton is a village and civil parish in the English county of Wiltshire, about 3.5 miles (5.6 km) west of Marlborough. The river Kennet runs immediately north of the village, separating it from the A4 road. The parish includes the village of Lockeridge, also near the river, further east (downstream).

== History ==
The area has many prehistoric sites, and the Avebury section of the Stonehenge and Avebury World Heritage site extends into the northwest of the parish. Within that area, on the southern slopes of Overton Down, are seven Bronze Age round barrows, forming a cemetery which extends south onto Overton Hill, overlooking the river. In modern archaeology, this it the type site for the Overton Period of 2000–1650 BC.

Also on Overton Hill, just over the parish boundary, is The Sanctuary, the site of a Neolithic monument which had two concentric circles of stones and four concentric circles of timber posts, and was linked to the stone circles at Avebury, 2.5km to the northwest, by two lines of stones known as West Kennet Avenue.

North of the village, on the slopes of Overton Down, are an oval Iron Age enclosure and three Roman burial mounds, a short length of Roman road and an Anglo-Saxon inhumation cemetery. In the far north of the parish are further Bronze Age, Roman and later settlements. In the south, within West Woods, is a Neolithic long barrow.

A manor is named as Uferan Tune in a charter dated 939. In 1086, the Domesday survey recorded 13 households at (West) Ovretone, and land held by Wilton Abbey. Another 13 were at Fyfield and two at East Overton, both on land held by St. Swithun's Priory, Winchester; there were smaller settlements at Locherige (Lockeridge) and at Shaw. It is likely that in the 12th and 13th centuries the entire parish lay within Savernake forest.

The earlier manors were reflected in the later composition of Overton parish, which had tithings of East Overton, West Overton, Lockeridge and Shaw, together with the chapelry of Fyfield. The western boundary of the parish was defined by an ancient trackway on the summits of the Marlborough Downs. The parish had a detached part to the southwest, namely the chapelry of Alton Priors (its name deriving from ownership by St Swithun's Priory). The settlements at East and West Overton were adjacent, and since the later 18th century the merged village has been called West Overton.

The village of Shaw, southwest of West Overton and straddling the Wansdyke earthwork, was apparently deserted in the 15th century. Alton Priors and Fyfield became separate civil parishes in the 19th century.

The Wiltshire Victoria County History has an account of the many owners of the manors of Overton, Lockeridge and Shaw. By 1870, when the Overton estate was sold to the trustees of London brewery owner Sir Henry Meux, it encompassed land at Fyfield, Lockeridge and Clatford, and the woodland at West Woods. After the death of his son in 1900, the estate was owned for a short time by Alec Taylor of Manton House. The Forestry Commission bought West Woods in 1931.

The London to Bath road was turnpiked in 1743. In the 1970s, the opening of the M4 motorway, about 9 miles (14 km) to the north, reduced the amount of traffic on what was by then the A4.

== Local government ==
West Overton parish elects a joint parish council with the adjacent parish of Fyfield, named Kennet Valley Parish Council (the name Fyfield and West Overton was used until 2022). The parish falls within the area of the Wiltshire Council, a unitary authority which is responsible for all significant local government functions.

== Religious sites ==
=== Parish church ===
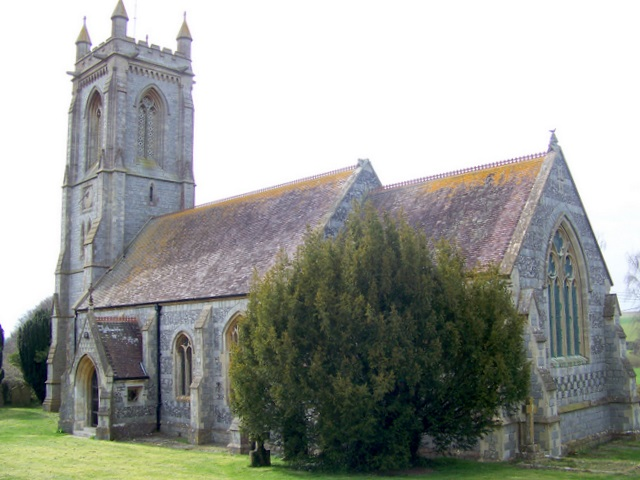
St Michael's Church

There was a church at Overton in the 12th century, and by the next century the churches at Fyfield and Alton Priors were dependent on it. St. Swithun's Priory, Winchester, appropriated Overton church and its chapels in 1291.

The parish church of St Michael and All Angels was built in 1877–8, in flint with squared sarsen banding, by C.E. Ponting, architect to the Meux estate. The tower – described by Pevsner as "just a little too thin to be genuine" was not completed until 1883. It replaced an earlier church which had become dilapidated, and the nave was built on the same foundations.

Construction was financed by Sir Henry Meux, and reused the chancel arch and three nave windows; oak beams from the nave roof were made into internal doors, a lectern and panels of the pulpit. A fragment of a Norman church survives: the head of a small 12th-century window was reset into a wall of the porch.

The church had three bells in 1553, one of which is still present. Another dates from 1606; in 1883 one old bell was recast and three made, bringing the peal to six. Ponting also designed the parish war memorial, a tall stone cross dedicated in 1921, which stands opposite the churchyard. The church was recorded as Grade II* listed in 1958.

Alton Priors was anciently a chapelry of Overton, its church being some five miles south of Overton church by road. In 1913, Alton Priors was detached from Overton vicarage and attached to the adjacent rectory of Alton Barnes.

The benefice was united with those of Fyfield and East Kennett in 1929. Today the parish is part of the Upper Kennet Benefice, created in 1978, which covers eight churches in the area.

=== Methodists ===
From 1901 to 1966 there was a Methodist chapel at West Overton.

== Amenities ==
A National School was built at Lockeridge in 1875 to serve the parishes of West Overton and Fyfield. The building (and extensions) continues in use as Kennet Valley C of E Voluntary Aided Primary School.

The parish has a village hall, Kennet Valley Village Hall, near Lockeridge.

== Landmarks ==
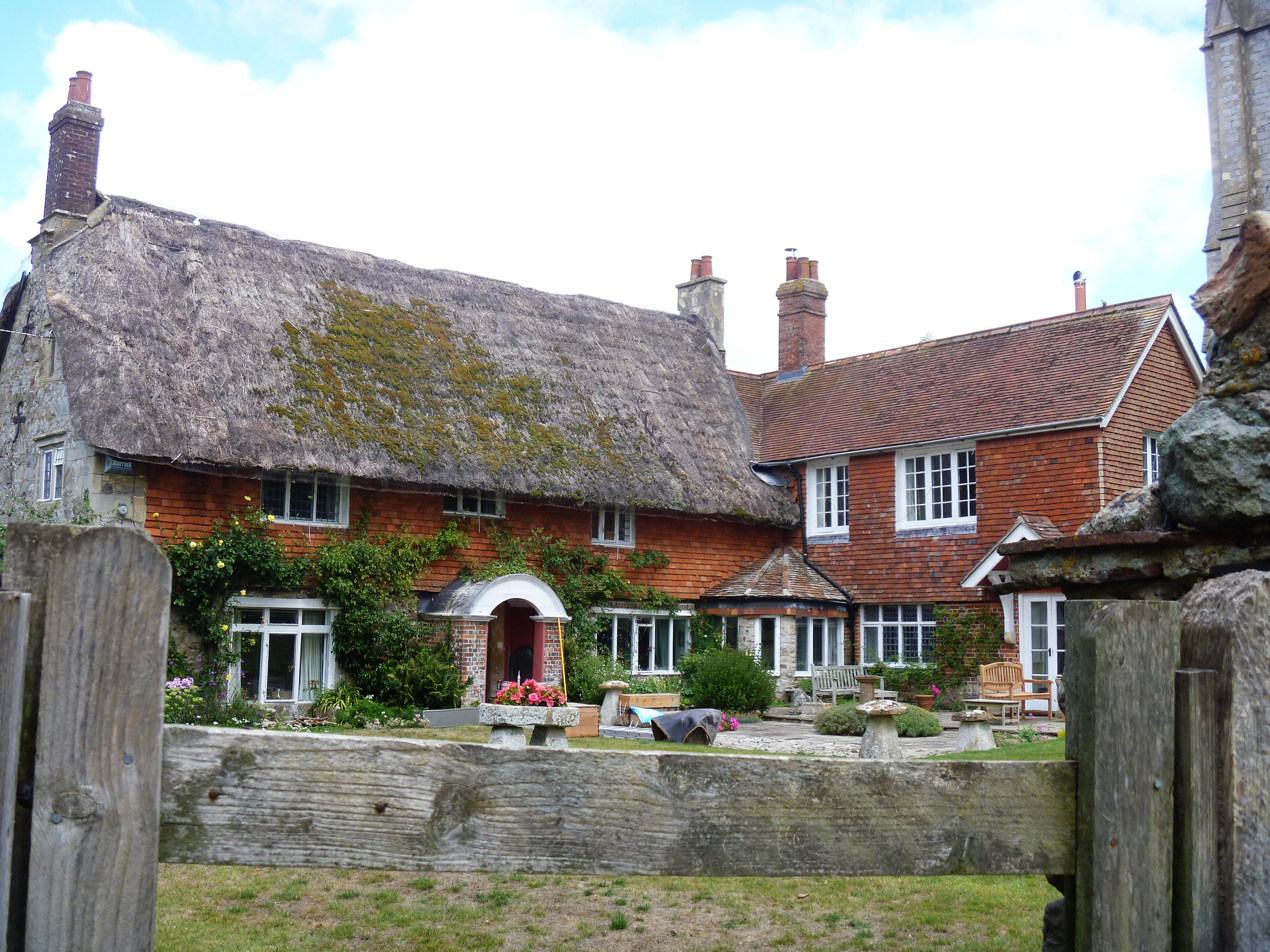
Overton manor house

Overton manor house, close to the church, is from the 16th and 17th centuries with later improvements; the main wing has a tile-hung upper floor under a thatched roof, and at right angles a former barn is in red brick. West Overton House, in the northeast of the village, is a former rectory of the late 18th century with later extensions.

Shaw House, which replaced an earlier manor house 400m to the east, was built in brick in the early 19th century. Lockeridge House, standing on the other side of the river from Lockeridge village, was built in red brick around 1740 and is Grade II* listed.

North of the A4, the parish extends onto the Marlborough Downs. On Overton Down is an earthwork built in 1960 as a long-term archaeology experiment. The Piggledene valley, with its sarsen stones, is a biological and geological Site of Special Scientific Interest managed by the National Trust.

Overton Hill, with prehistoric features including The Sanctuary, is to the west of the village and partly in Avebury parish. The ancient Ridgeway, now a national trail, begins here and follows the parish boundary northwards.

The medieval Wansdyke earthwork crosses the southernmost part of the parish.

== Gallery ==
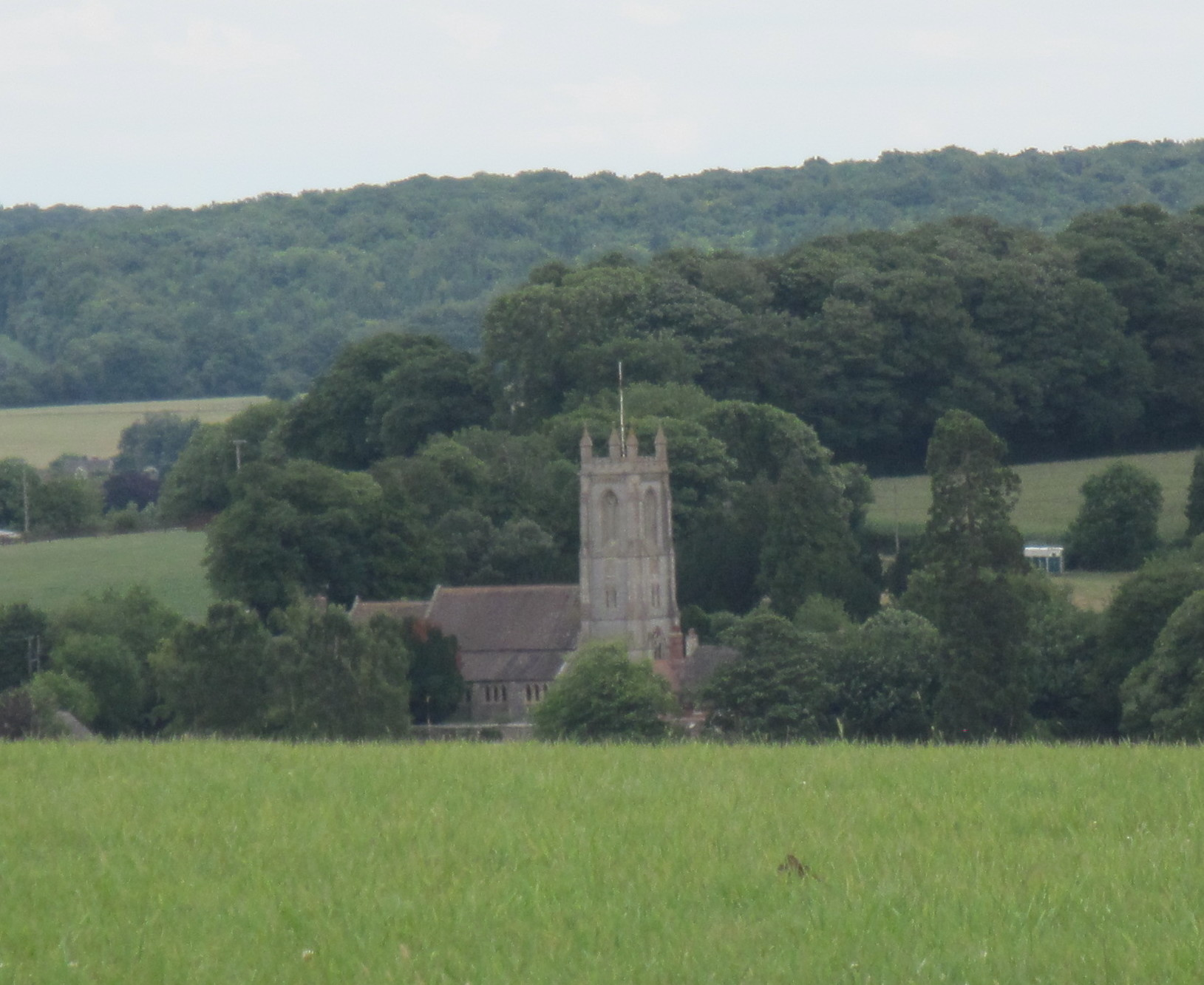
St Michael and All Angels church seen from Overton Hill

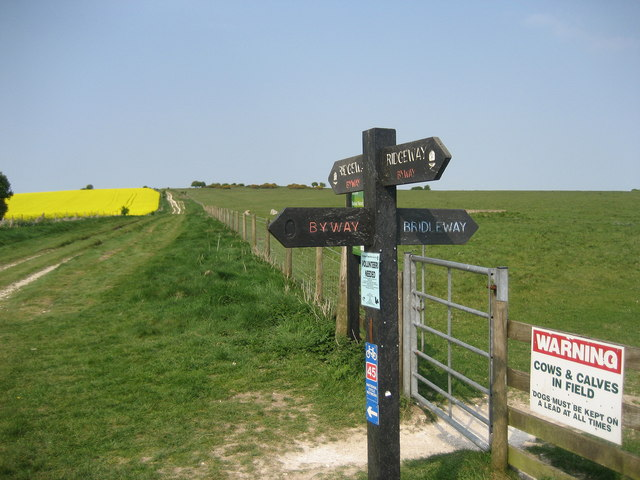
Crossing point on Overton Down of the Wessex Ridgeway and the Ridgeway National Trail

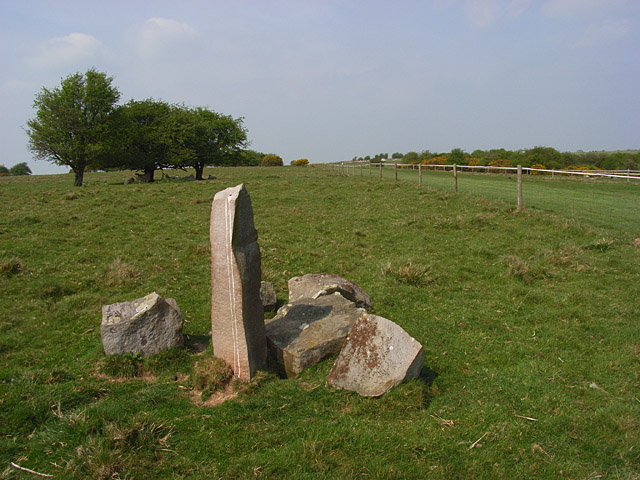
Standing stone and gallop, Overton Down

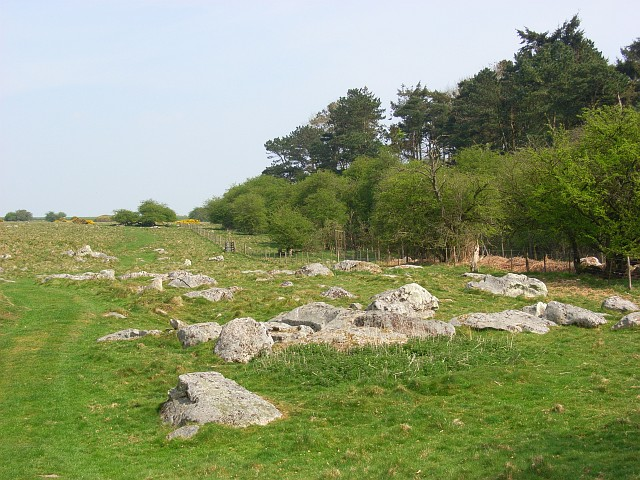
Sarsen stones beside Delling Copse
