= Joshua Pollard =

British archaeologist (born 1968)

Joshua Pollard FSA
- Born: Carl Joshua Pollard; May 1968 (age 58)

Academic background
- Education: University of Cardiff
- Thesis: Traditions of deposition in the neolithic of Wessex (1993)

Academic work
- Discipline: Archaeology
- Sub-discipline: Neolithic British Isles
- Institutions: University of Southampton
- Doctoral students: Susan Greaney

C. Joshua Pollard FSA (born May 1968) is a British archaeologist who is a professor of archaeology at the University of Southampton. He gained his BA and PhD in archaeology from the Cardiff University, and is a specialist in the archaeology of the Neolithic period in the UK and north-west Europe, especially in relation to the study of depositional practices, monumentality, and landscape. He is a Fellow of the Society of Antiquaries of London

Pollard has been involved in field projects around the Neolithic monument complexes of Avebury and Stonehenge, including the 1997–2003 Longstones Project which sought to understand the sequence and context of monument construction in the later Neolithic in the Avebury region, and which led to the rediscovery of a second megalithic avenue (the Beckhampton Avenue) leading from the Avebury henge and an unusual later Neolithic enclosure. The project also examined other key elements of the complex, such as the West Kennet Avenue, Falkner's Circle and the Avebury Cove.

He has been involved in the Stonehenge Riverside Project since 2004: a field project that he jointly directs with Dr Mike Parker Pearson, Dr Colin Richards, Dr Julian Thomas, Dr Chris Tilley and Dr Kate Welham. The project's aim is to understand the local and regional context of Stonehenge, not as a monument in isolation, but as part of a more extensive 3rd and early 2nd millennium BC ceremonial complex focused on the River Avon. Work at the henge enclosure of Durrington Walls in 2004 explored the area of the south-eastern entrance, and the relationship between the henge and River Avon.

He can be seen on 'Digging for Britain in 2017. Pollard is currently working on the "Living with Monuments” (2016–2021) project in collaboration with Prof. Mark Gillings at Bournemouth University and the National Trust at Avebury.

== Books ==
- Gillings, M., Pollard, J., Peterson, R. & Wheatley, D. 2008. Landscape of the Megaliths: excavation and fieldwork on the Avebury monuments, 1997–2003. Oxford: Oxbow Books
- Pollard, J., Howell, R., Chadwick, A. & Leaver, A. 2006. Lodge Hill Camp, Caerleon, and the Hillforts of Gwent. Oxford: British Archaeological Reports
- Gillings, M. & Pollard, J. 2004. Avebury. London: Duckworth
- Cleal, R. & Pollard, J. (eds). 2004. Monuments and Material Culture: essays on Neolithic and Bronze Age Britain. East Salisbury: Hobnob Press
- Pollard, J. & Reynolds, A. 2002. Avebury: the biography of a landscape. Stroud and Charleston, SC: Tempus
- Whittle, A., Pollard, J. & Grigson, C. 1999. The Harmony of Symbols: the Windmill Hill causewayed enclosure. Oxford: Oxbow Books
- Pollard, J. 1997. Neolithic Britain. Princes Risborough: Shire Publications
- Pollard, J. (ed). 2008. Prehistoric Britain. Oxford: Blackwell Publishing
