= Avebury (village) =

Village and civil parish in Wiltshire, England

Coordinates: 51.428°N 1.856°W

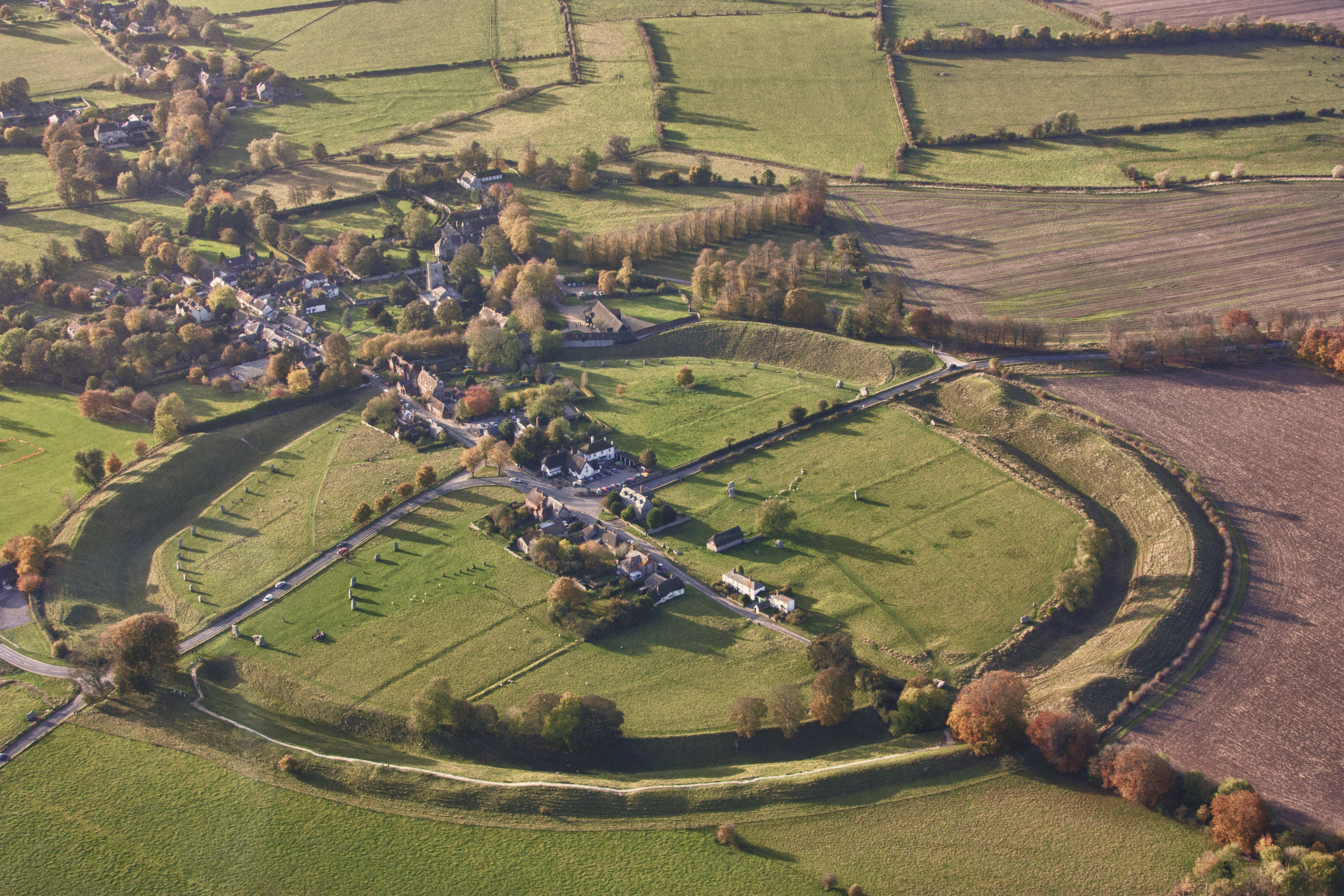
- Avebury from the air

- Location within Wiltshire
- Population: 582 (in 2021)
- OS grid reference: SU101699
- Civil parish: Avebury
- Unitary authority: Wiltshire
- Ceremonial county: Wiltshire
- Region: South West
- Country: England
- Sovereign state: United Kingdom
- Post town: Marlborough
- Postcode district: SN8
- Dialling code: 01672
- Police: Wiltshire
- Fire: Dorset and Wiltshire
- Ambulance: South Western
- UK Parliament: East Wiltshire
- Website: Parish Council

Avebury (/ˈeɪvbəri/) is a village and civil parish in Wiltshire, England, United Kingdom. The village is about 5.5 miles (9 km) west of Marlborough and 8 miles (13 km) northeast of Devizes. Much of the village is encircled by the prehistoric monument complex also known as Avebury. The parish also includes the small villages of Avebury Trusloe and Beckhampton, and the hamlet of West Kennett.

== Prehistory ==
=== Stone circles ===
The Avebury monument is vast, and consists of several smaller sites of varying dates. The earliest of these, the earthworks, dates to between 3400 and 2625 BC. Later additions include a henge and several stone circles. Starting in around the 14th century, locals began dismantling the stone circles for one reason or another: to clear land, to provide material for other building projects, or simply to efface a pagan monument. In 1648 John Aubrey visited the site and found most of the stones still standing or lying nearby:

These Downes looke as if they were Sown with great Stones, very thicke; and in a dusky evening they looke like a flock of Sheep: from whence it takes its name. One might fancy it to have been the Scene where the Giants fought with stones against the Gods... I was wonderfully surprised at the sight of those vast stones, of which I had never heard before; as also at the mighty Banke and Graffe [ditch] about it. I observed in the Inclosures some segments of rude circles, made with these stones, whence I concluded, they had been in old time complete.

In the 18th century, William Stukeley visited the site and chronicled the further damage that had been done. In 1872, the banker and Liberal MP, Sir John Lubbock, bought part of the village and protected the monuments. He later promoted the Ancient Monuments Protection Act 1882 to ensure the British government protected ancient monuments.

In the 1930s, the archaeologist Alexander Keiller re-erected many of the fallen stones, partially restoring the circle to its original condition. In 1943 the government took possession of the monument and the village; they are currently administered by the National Trust. In 1986 UNESCO added Avebury, along with Stonehenge, Silbury Hill, and associated local sites, to its World Heritage List.

=== Other sites ===
The earliest occupied site in the area is on Windmill Hill in the north-west of the parish, where a causewayed enclosure with three concentric ditches was built c.3700 BC on an earlier field system.

Two avenues of standing stones radiate from Avebury henge. Kennet Avenue runs south-east for about 2.3 kilometres (1.4 mi) from the south entrance of the henge to Overton Hill, just beyond West Kennett hamlet. Originally there were around 100 pairs of stones, and many survive although some are buried or have been re-erected. On the hill stood a stone and timber circle, destroyed in the 18th century, known as The Sanctuary. The second avenue, known as Beckhampton Avenue, consisted of pairs of stones running south-west for about 1.2 kilometres (0.75 mi) from the west entrance of the henge to a cove known as The Longstones near Beckhampton. Of this avenue, only one stone remains (one of the Longstones); the rest are either buried or missing.

Other prehistoric sites in the parish include Silbury Hill, south of the henge, a chalk and earth mound about 40 metres (130 ft) high. Further south (on the other side of the A4) is West Kennet Long Barrow, a chambered long barrow. Falkner's Circle, 750 metres (820 yards) south-east of the henge, was a stone circle of which one stone remains.

== Modern history ==
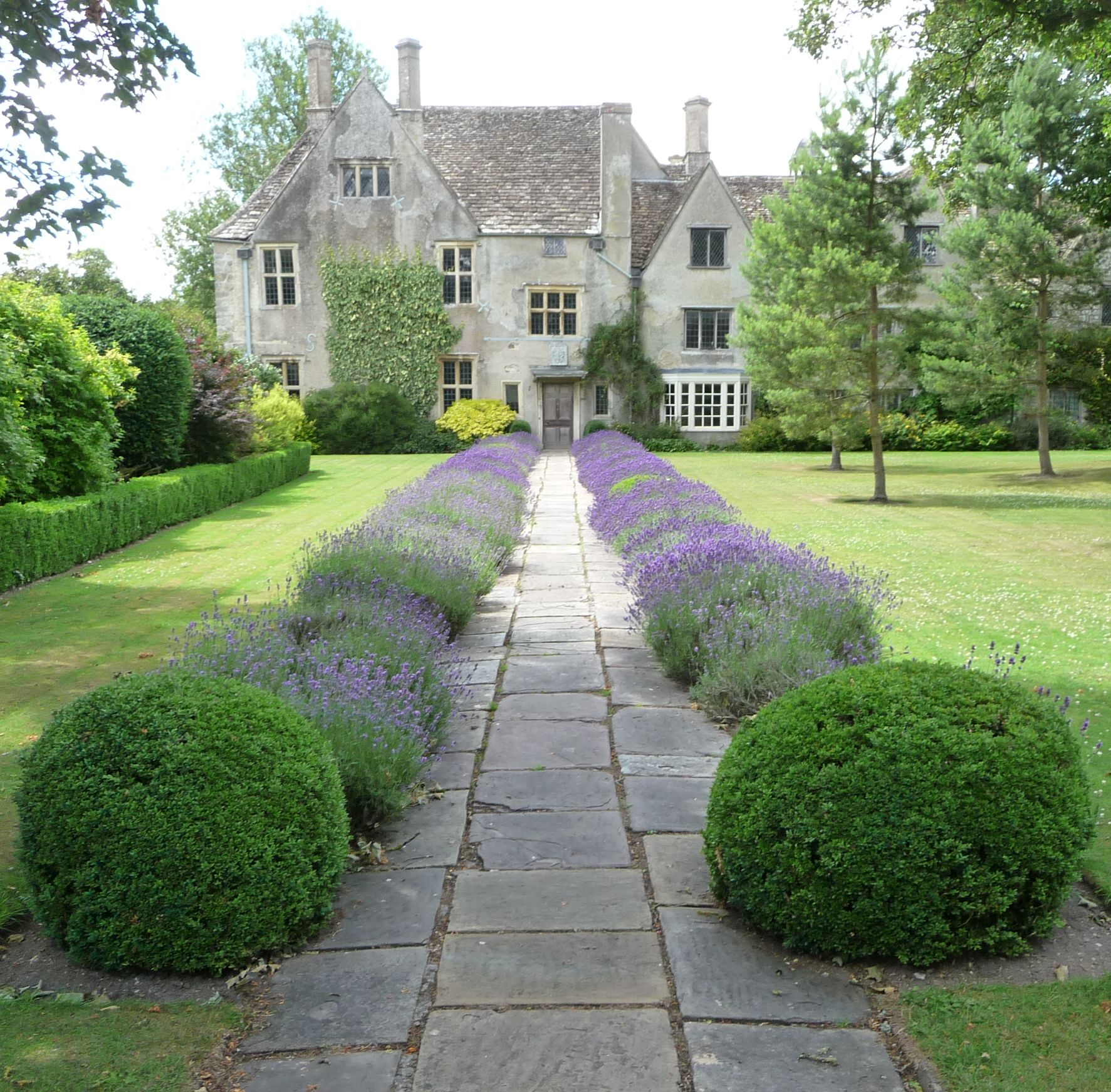
Entrance to Avebury Manor

The Roman road from Silchester to Bath followed the Kennet valley west from Cunetio (near Marlborough), then continued over West Down. A section of the agger, some 300 metres (yards) long and up to 1 metre (3.3 ft) high, is visible south-west of Beckhampton.

The name Avebury possibly derives from the Old English Afaburh meaning 'Afa's fortification'. Alternatively, it may possibly mean 'fortification on the River Avon'.

Domesday Book in 1086 recorded a church at Avreberie but no further details; the population of the settlement may have been recorded under another estate name. Fourteen households were recorded at Backentone, on land held by Gilbert of Bretteville. The village grew around the church and the manor houses of Avebury and Avebury Trusloe. In 1377 there were 134 poll-tax payers in the village, making it one of the largest settlements in Selkley hundred, together with 31 at Beckhampton and 24 at West Kennet.

Henry I granted an estate at Avebury to his chamberlain William de Tancarville, who in 1114 granted it to the Abbey of Saint-Georges, Boscherville, Normandy, leading to the establishment of Avebury Priory. After the expulsion of the alien priories, in 1411 the manor was granted to the collegiate church at Fotheringhay, Northamptonshire. The college exchanged the land with the Crown in 1545, and in 1547 the manor was granted to the courtier Sir William Sharington, who had extensive landholdings in Wiltshire and neighbouring counties. Later owners included William Dunche (from 1551); John Stawell (from 1640); his son Ralph, created Baron Stawell in 1683; Adam Williamson (d.1798), governor of Jamaica; Sir Henry Meux (from 1873), MP and brewery owner, and his son, also Henry. Manor Farm (excluding the manor house) was sold off in 1902, and bought by the National Trust in 1943. The house, Avebury Manor, was bought in 1955 by Sir Francis Knowles, who restored it and began to open it to the public in 1956. After passing through several hands following his death in 1974, the house was bought by the National Trust in 1991.

The land held by the church at the time of the Domesday survey was granted to Cirencester Abbey by Henry III in 1133. In 1604 the rectory estate was granted to the Dunche family, and probably merged with the manor estate.

=== Avebury Trusloe ===
Another manor held by the abbey was bought by Joan Trusloe in 1563, and around 1628 the estate known as Avebury Trusloe was held by William Dunche; he sold it to Sir Edward Baynton in 1633. The Victoria County History traces the later owners including Alexander Keiller, who bought a farm in the 1920s and sold it to the National Trust in 1943. The house known as Trusloe Manor began as a rebuilding c.1520, was later reduced in size to four bays, and in the 1980s gained a large rear wing.

=== Beckhampton ===
Racehorses have been trained at Beckhampton House, using gallops on West Down, since the mid 19th century. Notable trainers include Sam Darling and his son Fred Darling who had nine Derby winners between them in the first half of the 20th century; then Noel Murless between 1948 and 1952, followed by Jeremy Tree, and since 1990 Roger Charlton.

== Geography ==
The River Kennet flows south through the parish, passing just west of Avebury village before turning east near Silbury Hill on its journey towards Marlborough. Higher ground includes Windmill Hill in the northwest corner of the parish, and Avebury Down in the east.

Beckhampton, Avebury Trusloe and Avebury are on the A4361, a renumbered section of the A361 between Devizes and Swindon. The Calne–Marlborough section of the A4 crosses the A361 at Beckhampton and continues east through West Kennet.

== Religious sites ==
=== Parish church ===
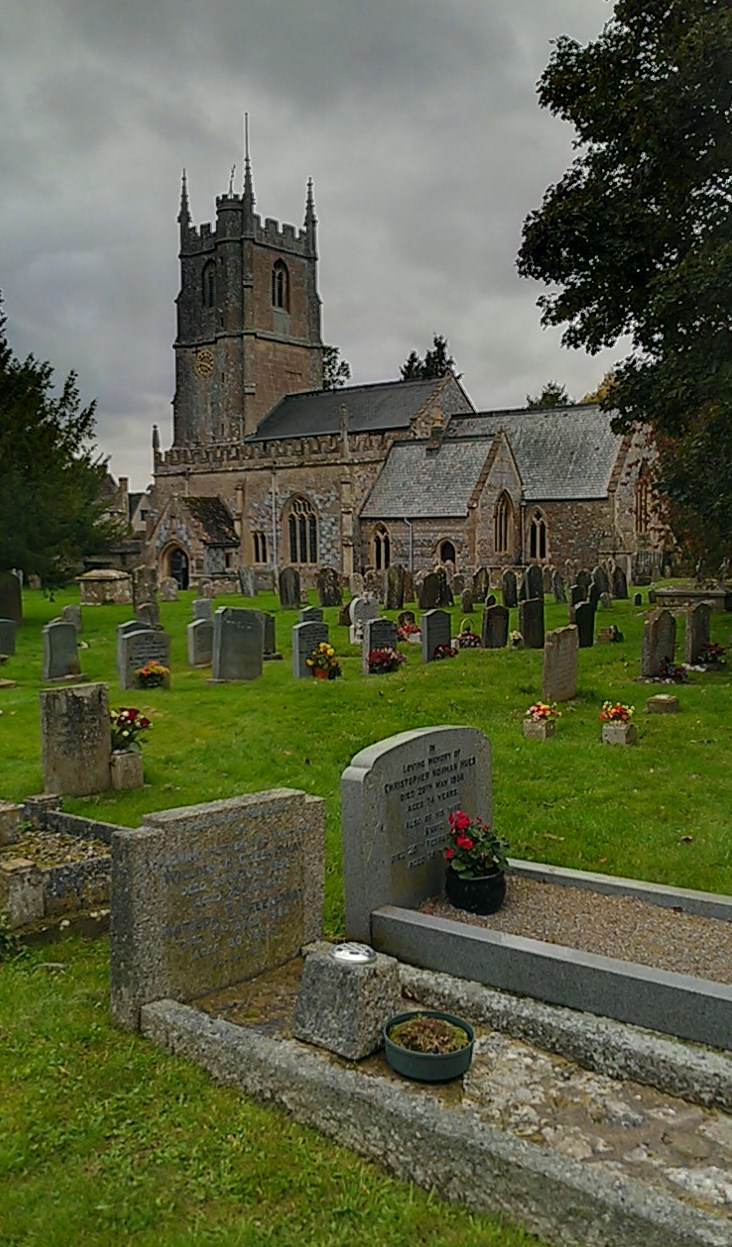
St James' Church

Pevsner describes the Church of England parish church of St James as "archaeologically uncommonly interesting". There was a stone church on this site, just west of the prehistoric earthwork, in the 10th century; it had a high and narrow nave without aisles, similar in its proportions to St Laurence's Church, Bradford-on-Avon. Parts of this building survive, in quoins at the north-west corner and two small windows at the west end (now internal to the church), which had external shutters rather than glazing. Three circular clerestory windows in the north wall are also Anglo-Saxon.

Aisles were added in the 12th century, the nave walls being pierced by low arches; the aisles were widened in the 15th century and in 1812 the arches were rebuilt to let in more light, but fragments of 12th-century work remain. Pevsner called the newer Tuscan columns "a surprise, but not an unpleasant one". In the 14th century the south porch was rebuilt, using a 12th-century doorway having two carved orders and a hood mould. The three-stage west tower, with stair-turret, was built around the same time.

The chancel was rebuilt in the 13th century, and again in 1879 during restoration by R. J. Withers. The church was designated as Grade I listed in 1966.

The stone font has carving which is probably from two periods. The lower part has an arcade of intersecting arches with a somewhat chaotic layout, while the upper decoration has foliage scrolls, two serpents or dragons, and a skirted figure which may be Saint Michael, holding a crozier. The font may be Saxon with Norman carving over-cut.

The chancel screen is a design of 1884 by C.E. Ponting, and above it is a 15th-century rood loft with coloured and gilded panels, complete and therefore described as "rare" by Historic England. The timbers of the loft were concealed behind a wall after the Reformation in the 16th century, remained undiscovered until 1810, and then were reinstalled by Ponting in 1878–1884. Monuments inside the church include an elaborate marble wall memorial to Susanna Holford (died 1772).

In 1979 there were five bells in the tower, dating from the 17th and 18th centuries; after the peal was restored in 1981 there were six cast at Whitechapel, and two more were added in 2009. The old tenor bell, cast in 1719 by Richard Phelps (born in Avebury and master of the Whitechapel foundry from 1701 to 1738) now strikes the hours.

The lychgate at the south entrance to the churchyard was designed by Ponting and erected in 1899. A heavy timber frame on low limestone walls, under a tiled roof, it is described by Historic England as a good example of its type.

The benefice was united with Winterbourne Monkton from 1747 to 1864, and again from 1929, although the parishes remained distinct. From 1952 and again from 1963, the incumbent also held the benefice of Berwick Bassett. In 1975 a team ministry was created for the area, and today the parish is part of the Upper Kennet Benefice, alongside seven others around Avebury.

=== Chapels ===
A nonconformist chapel was built inside the stone circle circa 1670, then extended in the 18th century and again in 1830. In the 20th century the congregation joined the United Reformed Church and in 1977 the building was designated as Grade II listed. The building was bought by the National Trust in 2017, regular worship having ceased by 2015, and is operated as an information centre.

A Strict Baptist chapel was built in 1873, replacing a building from the 1820s. The chapel closed circa 1953.

== Notable buildings ==
The parish has three Grade I listed buildings: St James' church, Avebury Manor, and the Great Barn at Manor Farm, north-east of the church. The late 17th-century barn has nine bays under a thatched roof; it was restored in 1978 and is used as a museum by the National Trust.

Beckhampton House began c.1745 as a large coaching inn on the Bath road; alterations in the 19th century included the addition of a stone porch. Built in brick with limestone sills, the house has three storeys and a five-bay front. Since 1855 it has been the farmhouse for the racehorse stables. A nearby 17th-century house, two storeys in stone with a thatched roof, is now the Waggon and Horses pub; additions in the late 19th century and early 20th are described as picturesque by Historic England.

West Kennett House was built c.1800. A three-storey house with a five-bay brick front and columned porch, it is described by Orbach as "rather urban Late Georgian".

=== Avebury Manor ===
Avebury Manor and Garden is a National Trust property in the village, near the church, consisting of the manor house and its garden. The house was begun c.1557 by William Dunch, extended in 1601 and partly rebuilt c.1907; it is Grade I listed. Since 1938 its 18th-century stables have housed a museum, now the Alexander Keiller Museum. A well-preserved 16th-century circular dovecote in the grounds is Grade II* listed.

== Governance ==
Avebury is a civil parish with an elected parish council. It is in the area of Wiltshire Council unitary authority, which is responsible for all significant local government functions. For Westminster elections, the parish is within the East Wiltshire constituency.

== Amenities ==
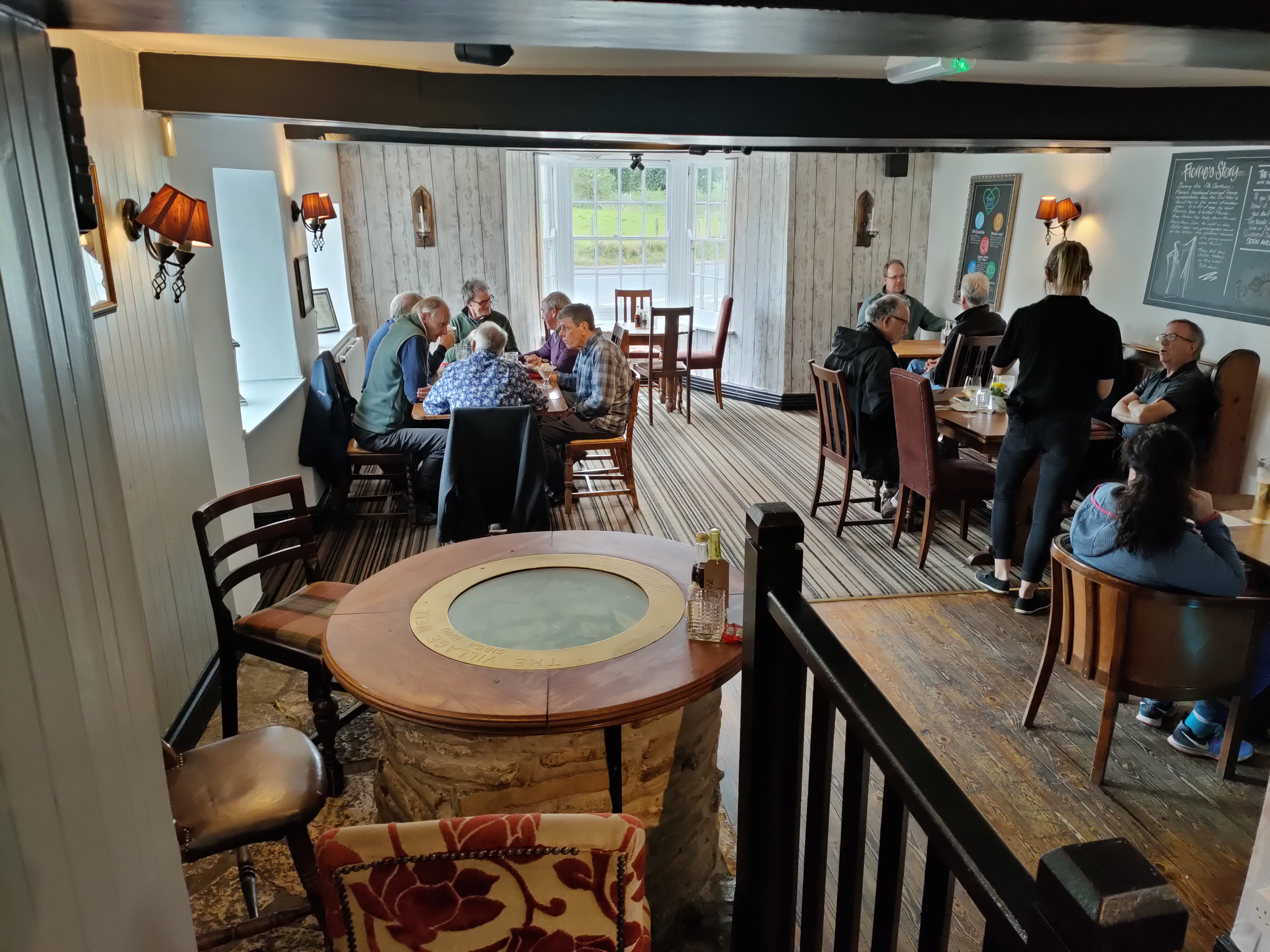
Table built over ancient well in Red Lion pub

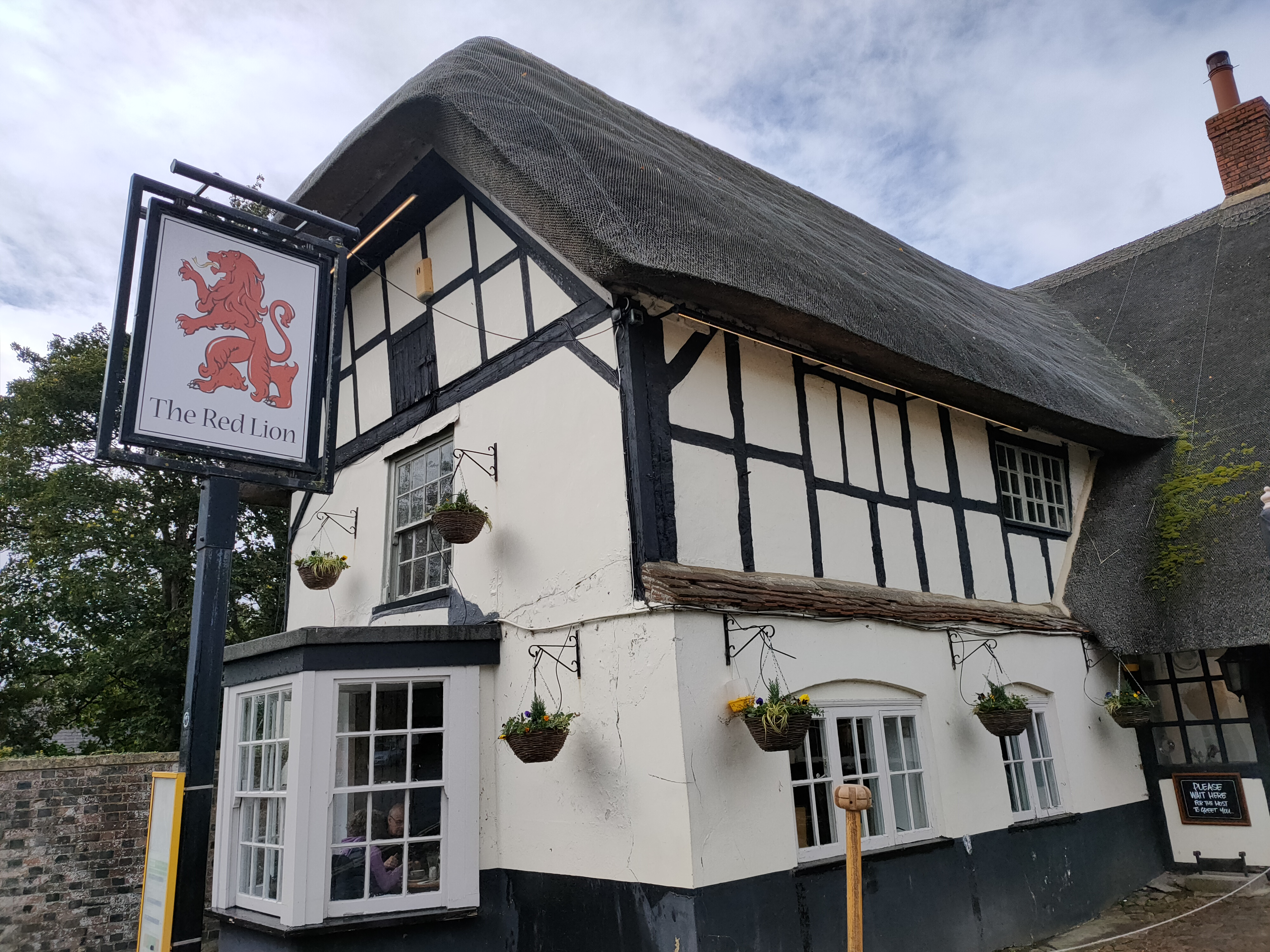
Red Lion public house

The village pub, The Red Lion, a former farmhouse from the late 16th century, claims to be the only pub in the world to be enclosed by a stone circle. It was built around the 86-foot deep village well which has been covered over with glass and now features as a dining table. Another pub, the Waggon and Horses, is about one mile south-west of the village at Beckhampton. The National Trust has a restaurant for visitors in converted farm buildings.

The village has no school, following closure of the primary school in 2007. This school, on the High Street opposite the church, began as a National School in 1844, then was rebuilt in 1849 and enlarged in 1873. In 1970 a new school was built behind the original and the old building became a social club for the community.

== In media ==
The stone circle has been used several times as a filming location. It was used in the short film Lucifer Rising (1972), and for the 1998 film Still Crazy.

Avebury was also the setting for the 1977 cult HTV West series Children of the Stones that depicts Avebury (renamed "Millbury") as a town controlled by the stones. Also in 1977, it was the location for the BBC's A Ghost Story for Christmas episode "Stigma".

In 2002, the stones and the Red Lion were the subject of an episode of Most Haunted, first shown on Living TV.

Avebury is the setting for Robert Goddard's thriller novel, Sight Unseen (2005).

Avebury, in particular, The Cove, is the setting for some of the action in and is referred to throughout Elly Griffiths' novel, The Stone Circle (Ruth Galloway, No.11) (2019).

== Sources ==
- Orbach, Julian; Pevsner, Nikolaus; Cherry, Bridget (2021). Wiltshire. The Buildings Of England. New Haven, US and London: Yale University Press. ISBN 978-0-300-25120-3. OCLC 1201298091.
