= Winterbourne Bassett Stone Circle =

Neolithic stone circle in Wiltshire, England

Coordinates: 51.4785°N 1.86649°W

Winterbourne Bassett Stone Circle is the remains of a stone circle near the village of Winterbourne Bassett in Wiltshire, South West England. Investigations in the 18th and 19th centuries found evidence of an outer and inner ring, and a single central stone; today six stones are visible although none remain upright.

== Description ==
Winterbourne Bassett Stone Circle was part of a tradition of stone circle construction that spread through much of Great Britain, Ireland, and Brittany between 3,300 and 900 BCE, during the Late Neolithic and Early Bronze Age. The stone circle tradition was accompanied by the construction of timber circles and earthen henges, reflecting a growing emphasis on circular monuments. The purpose of such rings is unknown, although archaeologists speculate that the stones represented supernatural entities for the circle's builders.

Burl called the monument "the most problematical of the Wiltshire rings", but also "the most impressive of the lesser" stone circles found in the area around Avebury. The site is 5.5 km to the north of Avebury, and thus would have been approximately an hour's walk from there. The circle would have been approximately two-thirds the size of the Avebury Stone Circle.

The circle site is on an eastern spur of a low ridge, about 1 kilometre (0.6 mi) northwest of Winterbourne Bassett village. By 1881, all of the circle's stones were lying prone. The Reverend A. C. Smith visited that year, and probed the ground to determine the location and dimensions of the stones; he returned the following year, accompanied by the Reverend W. C. Lukis. The only physical evidence of the monument left are a "jumble of stones" in a field located at the corner of two lanes between the eastern downs and the land to its west. An earthen long barrow was found nearby.

The site was designated as a scheduled monument in 1924.

== Context ==
While the transition from the Early Neolithic to the Late Neolithic in the fourth and third millennia BCE saw much economic and technological continuity, there was a considerable change in the style of monuments erected, particularly in what is now southern and eastern England. By 3000 BCE, the long barrows, causewayed enclosures, and cursuses which had predominated in the Early Neolithic were no longer built, and had been replaced by circular monuments of various kinds. These include earthen henges, timber circles, and stone circles. Stone circles are found in most areas of Britain where stone is available, with the exception of the island's south-eastern corner. They are most densely concentrated in south-western Britain and on the north-eastern horn of Scotland, near Aberdeen. The tradition of their construction may have lasted for 2,400 years, from 3300 to 900 BCE, with the major phase of building taking place between 3000 and 1,300 BCE.

These stone circles typically show very little evidence of human visitation during the period immediately following their creation. This suggests that they were not sites used for rituals that left archaeologically visible evidence, but may have been deliberately left as "silent and empty monuments". The archaeologist Mike Parker Pearson suggests that in Neolithic Britain, stone was associated with the dead, and wood with the living. Other archaeologists have suggested that the stone might not represent ancestors, but rather other supernatural entities, such as deities.

In the area of modern Wiltshire, various stone circles were erected, the best known of which are Avebury and Stonehenge. All of the other examples are ruined, and in some cases have been destroyed. As noted by the archaeologist Aubrey Burl, these examples have left behind "only frustrating descriptions and vague positions". Most of the known Wiltshire examples were erected on low-lying positions in the landscape. There are four smaller stone circles known from the area surrounding Avebury: The Sanctuary, Winterbourne Bassett Stone Circle, Clatford Stone Circle, and Falkner's Circle. Archaeologists initially suggested that a fifth example could be seen at Langdean Bottom near the village of West Overton, although further investigation has reinterpreted this as evidence for a late prehistoric hut circle or a medieval feature. Burl suggested that these smaller circles related to Avebury in a manner akin to "village churches within the diocese of a cathedral".

It was noted that while Falkner's Circle and Clatford Stone Circle bore many similarities in location and design, the Winterbourne Bassett Stone Circle was "distinctly different in setting and magnitude". It is possible that these three rings might have begun as timber circles before being changed to stone ones, or that the stone circles themselves included wooden elements.

== Antiquarian and archaeological investigation ==
Knowledge of Winterbourne Bassett Stone Circle derives almost entirely from antiquarian sources. Stukeley recorded two concentric sarsen rings, with an outlying stone to the west of these. Smith's plan, produced in the 1880s, proposed a diameter of c.71m for the outer circle and 45m for the inner circle.

The archaeologists Joshua Pollard and Andrew Reynolds stated that there was a "real need" for archaeologists to establish whether Winterbourne Bassett Stone Circle really was a human-built structure or whether it had been a scatter of natural stones mistaken for the former.

A geophysical survey in 1998 confirmed at least seven of the stones at the places indicated by Smith, although the results were described as being "very ambiguous".
