= Clatford Stone Circle =

Neolithic stone circle in Wiltshire, England

Clatford Stone Circle, also known as The Broadstones, was a stone circle located in the village of Clatford in the south-western English county of Wiltshire.

Clatford Stone Circle was part of a tradition of stone circle construction that spread through much of Great Britain, Ireland, and Brittany between 3,300 and 900 BCE, during the Late Neolithic and Early Bronze Age. The stone circle tradition was accompanied by the construction of timber circles and earthen henges, reflecting a growing emphasis on circular monuments. The purpose of such rings is unknown, although archaeologists speculate that the stones represented supernatural entities for the circle's builders.

The circle was visited and described by the antiquarian William Stukeley. By 1890, the stones that had comprised the circle had been removed.

== Description ==
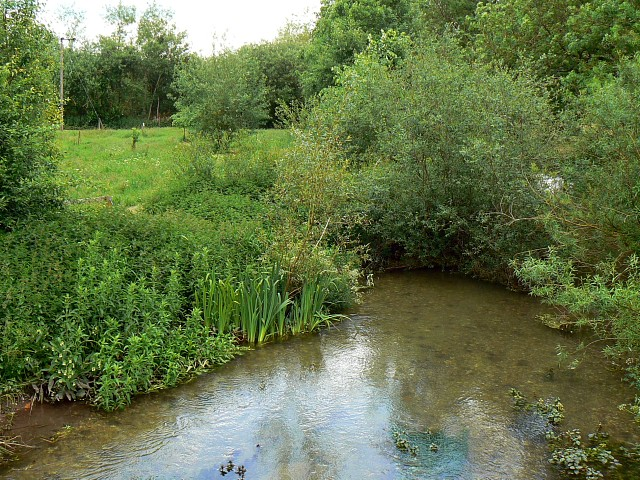
The stone circle was sited near the River Kennet as it passes through Clatford

Clatford Stone Circle stood at Clatford Bottom in the valley of the River Kennet, close to a flex in the river. Burl stated that it was probably in Broadstone West Meadows which would have made it approximately an hour's walk from Avebury. The site was overlooked by a number of barrows dating from the Early Bronze Age.

Stukeley described how, "over against Clatford at a flexture in the river, we met with several great stones" that were "flat upon the ground". The site was destroyed in the 1880s, for none of the stones remained by 1890.

== Context ==
Peasants, warriors, women with their children, the brightly-clothed and glittering chieftain once came to this ring of stones by the river where the land sloped, spread with sarsens, from the downs, the people coming at a time of death, bringing the body here, or at harvest, or to avert a feared danger. Their voices and movements gave the ring meaning. Now the stones themselves are gone and the only sound and motion is the slow flowing of the Kennet.

— Burl's imagined reconstruction of the Clatford Stone Circle, 1979

While the transition from the Early Neolithic to the Late Neolithic in the fourth and third millennia BCE saw much economic and technological continuity, there was a considerable change in the style of monuments erected, particularly in what is now southern and eastern England. By 3000 BCE, the long barrows, causewayed enclosures, and cursuses which had predominated in the Early Neolithic were no longer built, and had been replaced by circular monuments of various kinds. These include earthen henges, timber circles, and stone circles. Stone circles are found in most areas of Britain where stone is available, with the exception of the island's south-eastern corner. They are most densely concentrated in south-western Britain and on the north-eastern horn of Scotland, near Aberdeen. The tradition of their construction may have lasted for 2,400 years, from 3300 to 900 BCE, with the major phase of building taking place between 3000 and 1,300 BCE.

These stone circles typically show very little evidence of human visitation during the period immediately following their creation. This suggests that they were not sites used for rituals that left archaeologically visible evidence, but may have been deliberately left as "silent and empty monuments". The archaeologist Mike Parker Pearson suggests that in Neolithic Britain, stone was associated with the dead, and wood with the living. Other archaeologists have suggested that the stone might not represent ancestors, but rather other supernatural entities, such as deities.

In the area of modern Wiltshire, various stone circles were erected, the best known of which are Avebury and Stonehenge. All of the other examples are ruined, and in some cases have been destroyed. As noted by the archaeologist Aubrey Burl, these examples have left behind "only frustrating descriptions and vague positions". Most of the known Wiltshire examples were erected on low-lying positions in the landscape. There are four smaller stone circles known from the area surrounding Avebury: The Sanctuary, Winterbourne Bassett Stone Circle, Clatford Stone Circle, and Falkner's Circle. Archaeologists initially suggested that a fifth example could be seen at Langdean Bottom near the village of West Overton, although further investigation has reinterpreted this as evidence for a late prehistoric hut circle or a medieval feature. Burl suggested that these smaller stone related to Avebury in a manner akin to "village churches within the diocese of a cathedral". Clatford Stone Circle shares various characteristics with Falkner's Circle in that both contained comparatively few stones, were located in valleys, and had a diameter akin to that of the outer ring of The Sanctuary.

== Antiquarian and archaeological investigation ==
Knowledge of Clatford Stone Circle derives almost entirely from antiquarian sources. The archaeologists Joshua Pollard and Andrew Reynolds thought that the documentation of Clatford Stone Circle had been "marginally better" than that at Falkner's Circle. Pollard and Reynolds stated that there was a "real need" for archaeologists to establish whether Clatford Stone Circle really was a human-built structure or whether it had been a scatter of natural stones mistaken for the former.
