= Coneybury Henge =

Henge in Wiltshire, England

- Map showing Coneybury Henge within the Stonehenge section of the Stonehenge and Avebury World Heritage Site
- Interactive map of Coneybury Henge
- 51.1735°N 1.8093°W
- Type: Henge
- Periods: Neolithic / Bronze Age
- Location: OS SU13424160
- Region: Wiltshire

Site notes
- Excavation dates: 1980
- Archaeologists: Stonehenge Environs Project

UNESCO World Heritage Site
- Designated: 1986
- Reference no.: 373

Coneybury Henge is a henge which is part of the Stonehenge Landscape in Wiltshire, England. The henge, which has been almost completely flattened, was only discovered in the 20th century. Geophysical surveys and excavation have uncovered many of its features, which include a northeast entrance, an internal circle of postholes, and fragments of bone and pottery.

== Location ==
Coneybury Henge is around 1.4 kilometres east-by-southeast of Stonehenge, which can be seen from the site. The location has extensive views southeast across the Avon valley, and west towards Normanton Down. The henge is difficult to identify on the ground, having been levelled by ploughing, but has been identified on aerial photographs, geophysical survey, and by excavation. The absence of any mention of the henge in historical records suggests that it may have been levelled in medieval times or soon after, and this theory is supported by ridge and furrow marks visible on some aerial photographs.

== Discovery and excavation ==
The site was first noted from the air in the 1920s and thought to be a disc barrow. Later aerial photographs gave strong indications it was a Class I henge. The photographs show an oval ditch, around 45 metres by 55 metres in diameter. The entrance is on the longer axis on the northeast side. Traces of an external bank are said to be visible.

The henge was excavated in 1980 as part of the Stonehenge Environs Project. The excavations revealed a broad oval ditch around 4 metres wide by 3 metres deep defining the henge. Excavation of internal features included a few pits and postholes, numerous stakeholes, and an arc of postholes inside the inner edge of the enclosure ditch which may have represented a post circle. Some of the internal features may pre-date the henge. Finds included pottery ranging from the early Neolithic to middle Bronze Age, as well as animal bone and a human cremation.

== Coneybury Anomaly ==
Around 12 metres northwest of Coneybury Henge, evidence suggests a unique cross-cultural feast held long before the Henge was built. The Anomaly is a pit containing a large amount of early Neolithic pottery together with a large quantity of animal bone, and flint tools of both Mesolithic and Neolithic types. The excavators suggest that the Coneybury Anomaly represents the material remains of a gathering organized by a regional community, with participants coming from different cultures and locations.
