= Overton Hill =

Hill in Wiltshire, England

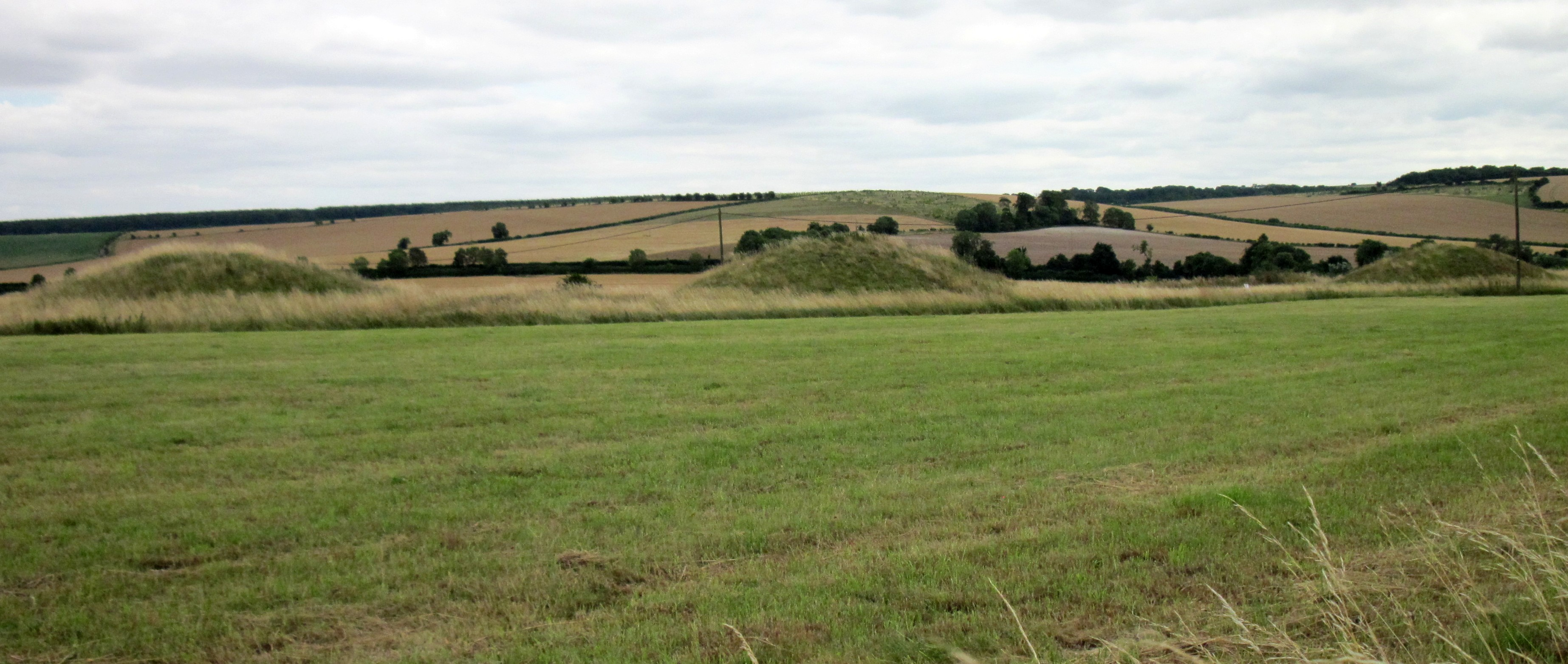
- Round tumuli on Overton Hill

Highest point
- Elevation: 174 m (571 ft)
- Coordinates: 51°24′36″N 1°49′54″W

Geography
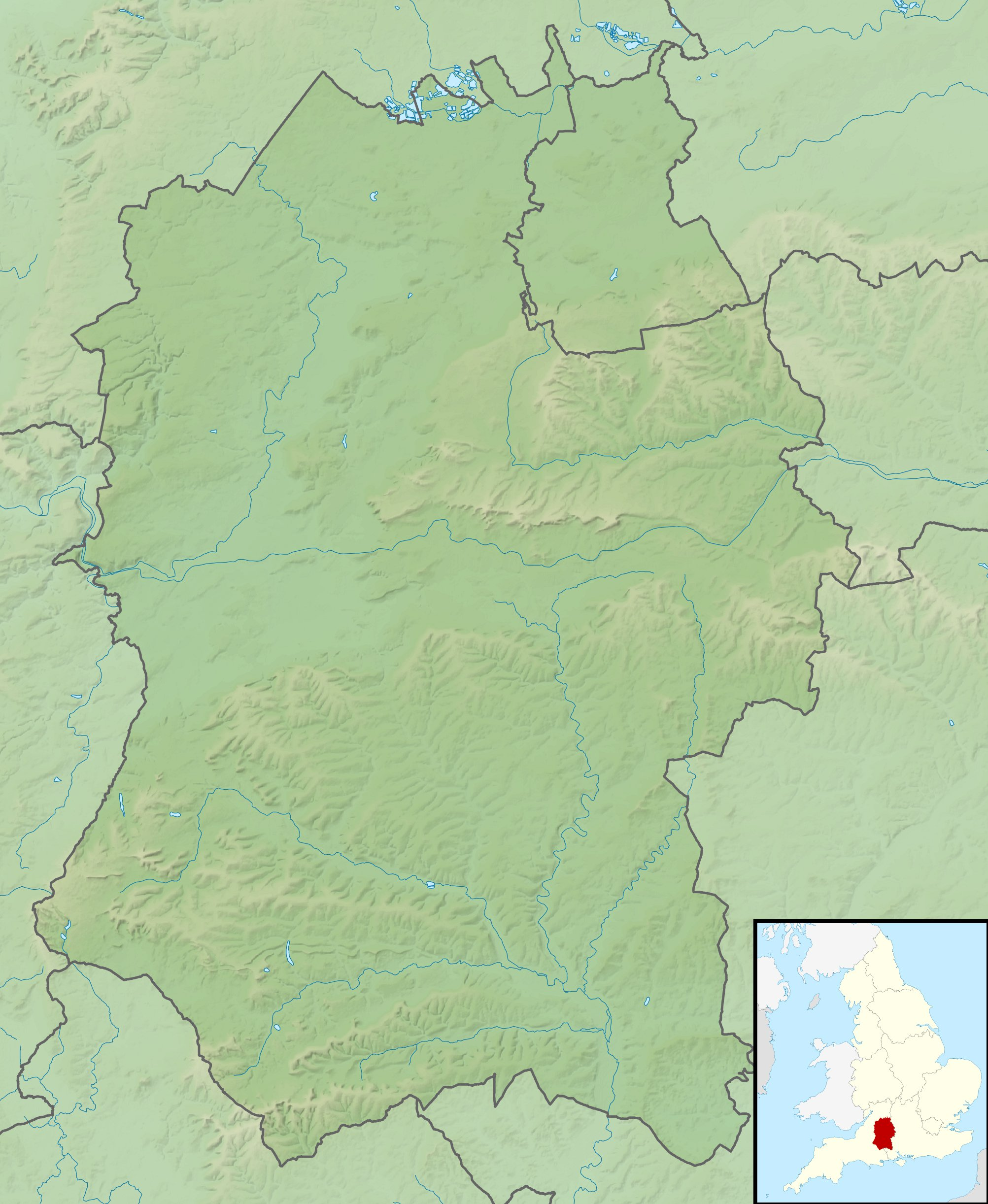
- Location within Wiltshire
- Location: Wiltshire, England
- OS grid: SU118679
- Topo map: OS Explorer 157

Overton Hill is a 571 ft (174 m) hill at the southern edge of the Marlborough Downs in Wiltshire, England. It lies just west of the village of West Overton and about 4 miles (6 km) west from the town of Marlborough. The A4 road passes close to the north, and to the south is the River Kennet.

The hill is notable for being the start point of the Ridgeway National Trail, which follows an ancient trackway. There several scheduled archaeological sites including several round barrows (burial mounds) on it, and the site of an Iron Age wooden circle known as The Sanctuary, indicating human activity for thousands of years. The hill is part of the Avebury section of the Stonehenge and Avebury World Heritage Site.
