= Beckhampton Avenue =

Archaeological site in England

UNESCO World Heritage Site
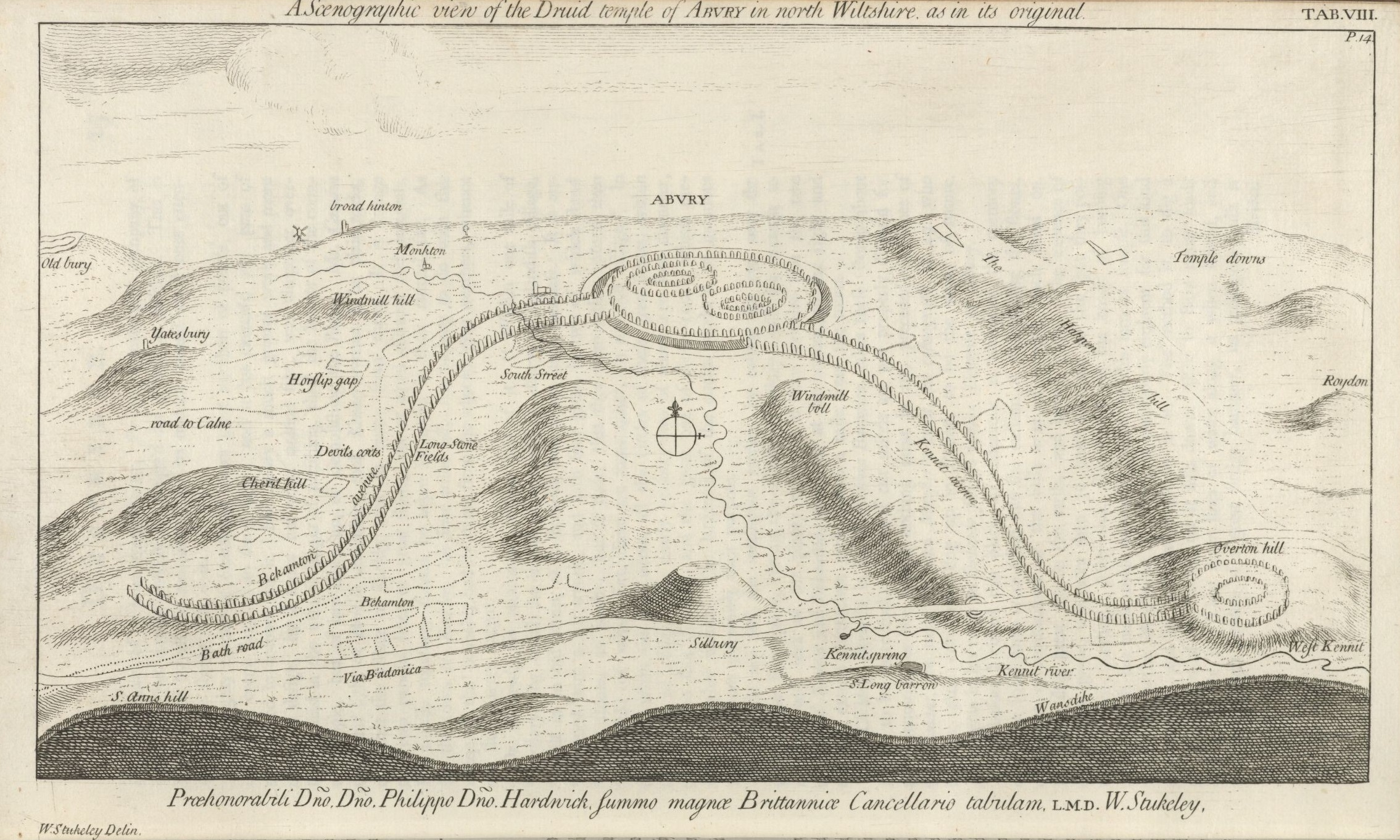
- Stukeley's vision of the complete Beckhampton Avenue
- Interactive map of Beckhampton Avenue
- Location: Wiltshire, United Kingdom
- Part of: Avebury Section of Stonehenge, Avebury and Associated Sites
- Criteria: Cultural: (i), (ii), (iii)
- Reference: 373bis-002
- Inscription: 1986 (10th Session)
- Extensions: 2008
- Coordinates: 51.425°N 1.870°W

The Beckhampton Avenue was a curving prehistoric avenue of stones that ran broadly south west from Avebury towards The Longstones at Beckhampton in the English county of Wiltshire. It probably dates to the late Neolithic and early Bronze Age.

== Description ==
Only one stone, known as "Adam", remains standing and even in William Stukeley's time (early 18th century) there was little evidence on the surface of the avenue. The other stones were probably broken up and sold by local landowners in the post-medieval era. Excavations by the University of Southampton in 2000, however, revealed the parallel rows of holes that held the stones. 120 metres (390 ft) of the avenue was uncovered and indicated that the avenue consisted of a double row of stones placed at 15 metres (49 ft) intervals in a similar pattern to those at Kennet Avenue.

Stukeley's theory was that the two avenues were part of a giant 'snake' winding across the landscape with its head at The Sanctuary and also incorporating the Avebury monument.

The avenue may have originally extended further past the Longstones, with Adam being part of the 'cove', or standing stone arrangement, sited along its course. "Eve" is a known part of the avenue leading back to the western gateway of the henge, which included what is now the village high street.

== Earlier history ==
Before the avenue was built, the site was host to an earlier Neolithic causewayed enclosure.
