= Mark Gillings =

British archaeologist and anthropologist

Mark Gillings is a British archaeologist.

Gillings is a professor of anthropology and archaeology at the University of Bristol. His specialization is landscape archaeology, in particular prehistoric sites; spatial analysis using geographic information systems (GIS) and archaeological theory. He has performed fieldwork at Orkney, Exmoor, and Avebury among other sites.

Gillings was educated at the University of Bradford in archaeological science and received his PhD in chemical analysis. During his post-doctorate research he worked on landscape archaeology using GIS when it was still a developing field. He has been teaching since 1992, and has taught at the University of Leicester, the University of Newcastle upon Tyne, among other institutions.

== See also ==
Joshua Pollard
