= Kennet Avenue =

Prehistoric site in Wiltshire, England

UNESCO World Heritage Site
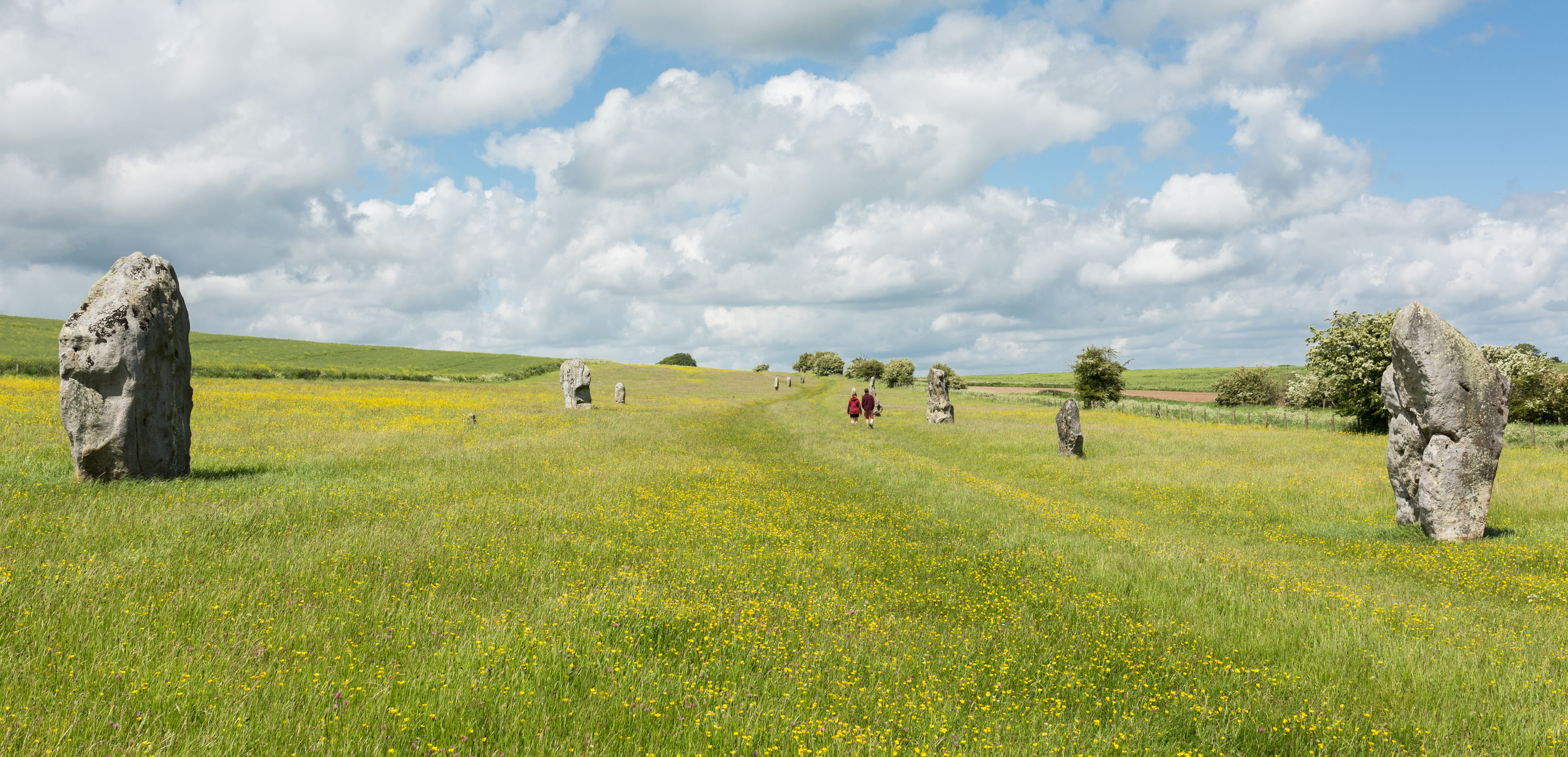
- Kennet Avenue in 2014

- Location within Wiltshire
- Location: Wiltshire, United Kingdom
- Part of: Avebury Section of Stonehenge, Avebury and Associated Sites
- Criteria: Cultural: (i), (ii), (iii)
- Reference: 373bis-002
- Inscription: 1986 (10th Session)
- Extensions: 2008
- Coordinates: 51°25′23″N 1°50′53″W

Kennet Avenue or West Kennet Avenue is a prehistoric site in the English county of Wiltshire. It was originally an avenue of two parallel lines of stones 25m wide and 2.5km in length, which ran between the Neolithic sites of Avebury and The Sanctuary. There are currently 27 upright stones and 37 concrete pillars marking original stone locations.

Excavations directed by Alexander Keiller and Stuart Piggott in 1934 and 1935 indicated that around 100 pairs of standing stones had lined the avenue, dated to around 2200 BC from finds of Beaker burials beneath some of them. The missing stones had been pushed over and buried, or broken up for building materials, between the 13th and 17th centuries.

The avenue is within the Avebury section of the Stonehenge and Avebury World Heritage Site. It is in the freehold ownership of the National Trust, and a scheduled monument in English Heritage guardianship. It is managed by the National Trust on behalf of English Heritage, and the two organisations share the cost of managing and maintaining the property.

A second avenue, called Beckhampton Avenue, led west from Avebury towards Beckhampton Long Barrow, with the 'Adam and Eve' long stones still standing west of the village of Avebury Trusloe.

== Archaeological excavations ==
=== 20th century excavations ===
Wiltshire Archaeological and Natural History Society committee member Maud Cunnington re-erected Stone 33a during her work there in 1911.

Alexander Keiller and Stuart Piggott directed a programme of stone "restoration" on the northern third of the avenue in 1934–1935, beginning at Stone 37a and Stone 37b in the south and finishing where the Avenue joins Avebury stone circle. Their team re-erected stones which had been buried through the medieval to early modern periods, and placed cast concrete 'pylons' or pyramids in the place of missing stones. The stone holes of missing stones were identified as patches of differently-coloured and disturbed earth during excavations.

In November 1960, William Young (who had served as foreman for Keiller's excavations) and Isobel Smith excavated at the site of Stone Hole 79B sponsored by the Ministry of Works. The site is along the Bath Road, at a midpoint between the last standing stones of the Avenue and the Sanctuary on Overton Hill.

=== Occupation site excavations in 2010s ===
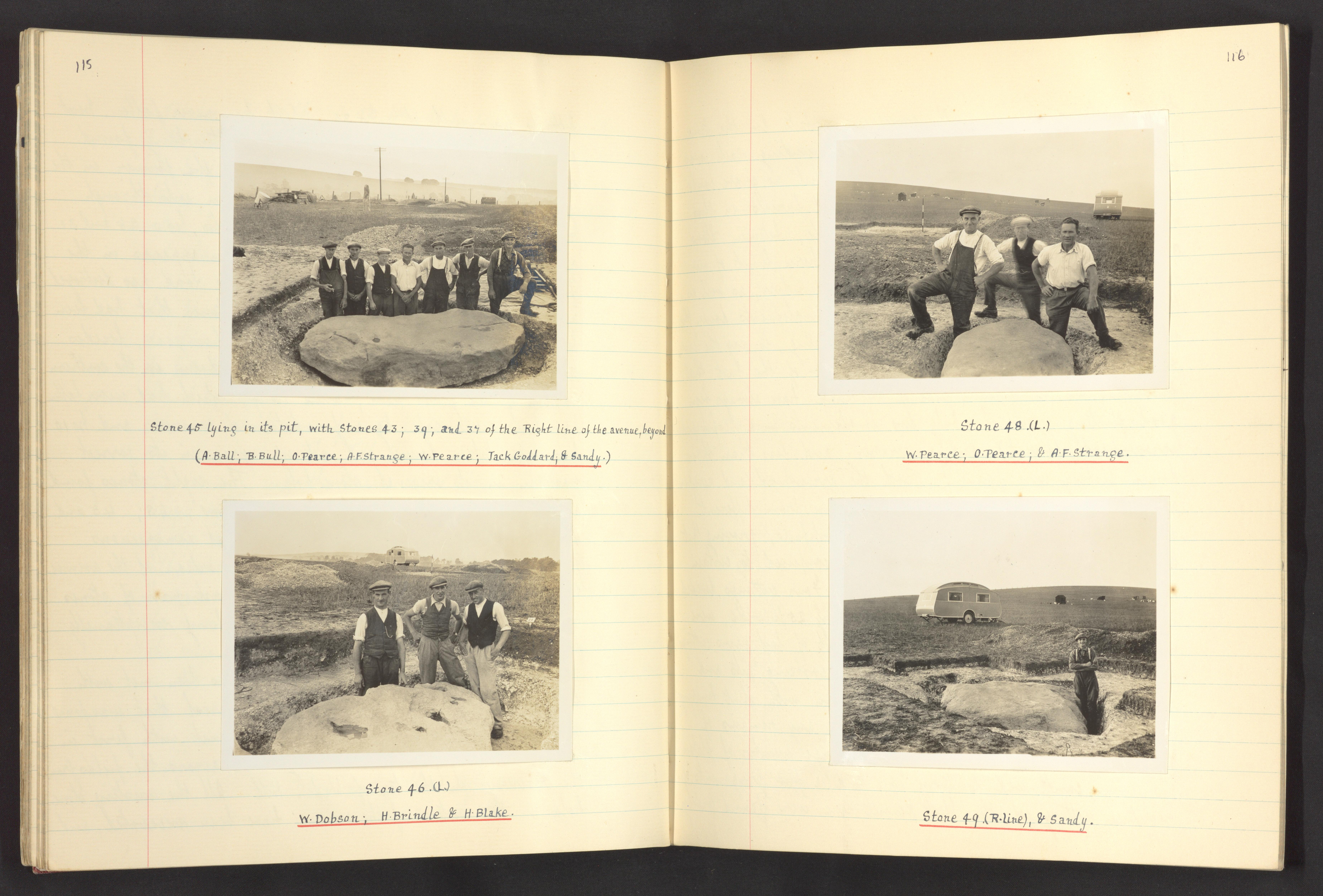
Photographs from William Young's 'Leaves from My Journal' volume 7 held at Wiltshire Museum, showing Archaeological workers at West Kennet Avenue in 1935.

The West Kennet Avenue occupation site, discovered by Keiller in 1934 and re-excavated by Joshua Pollard and Mark Gillings in 2013–15, is the remains of Neolithic settlement activity. The more recent excavations recovered 16,399 pieces of worked flint with dating ranging from the Mesolithic to the Early Bronze Age.

== Stone naming conventions ==
Alexander Keiller and Stuart Piggott assigned numbers to stones on the section of West Kennet Avenue that they excavated during 1934 and 1935. What they called numbers 1 and 2 (now 37B and 37A) marked their most southerly point. In their working documents, Keiller and Piggott called the east side of the Avenue the 'left' side, while the west was the 'right' side, which assumes viewing the Avenue facing away from Avebury.

Seven workers pose with a stone on West Kennet Avenue during the 1935 excavation season directed by Alexander Keiller and Stuart Piggott.

Isobel Smith, who was commissioned to write up and consolidate the Keiller-Piggott excavations by Gabrielle Keiller, renumbered the stones across Avebury and West Kennet Avenue. Her system for naming is still in place, starting with Stone 1A closest to Avebury, with paired A and B stones extending out towards the Sanctuary.

== Images ==
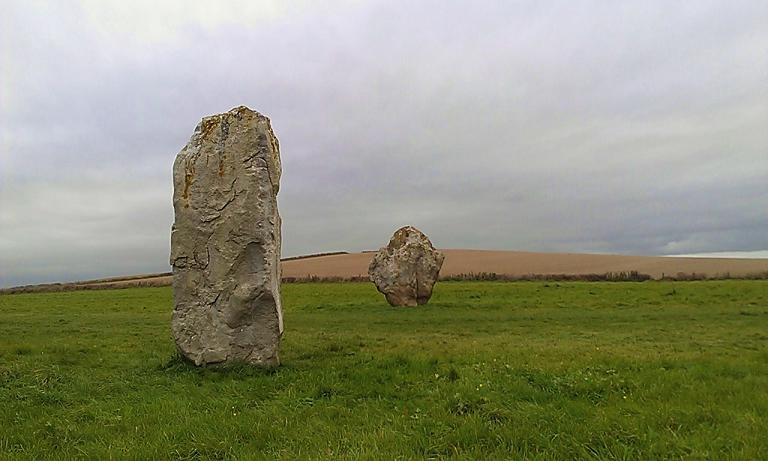
Stones on the Avenue, demonstrating the contested 'male' and 'female' shapes.

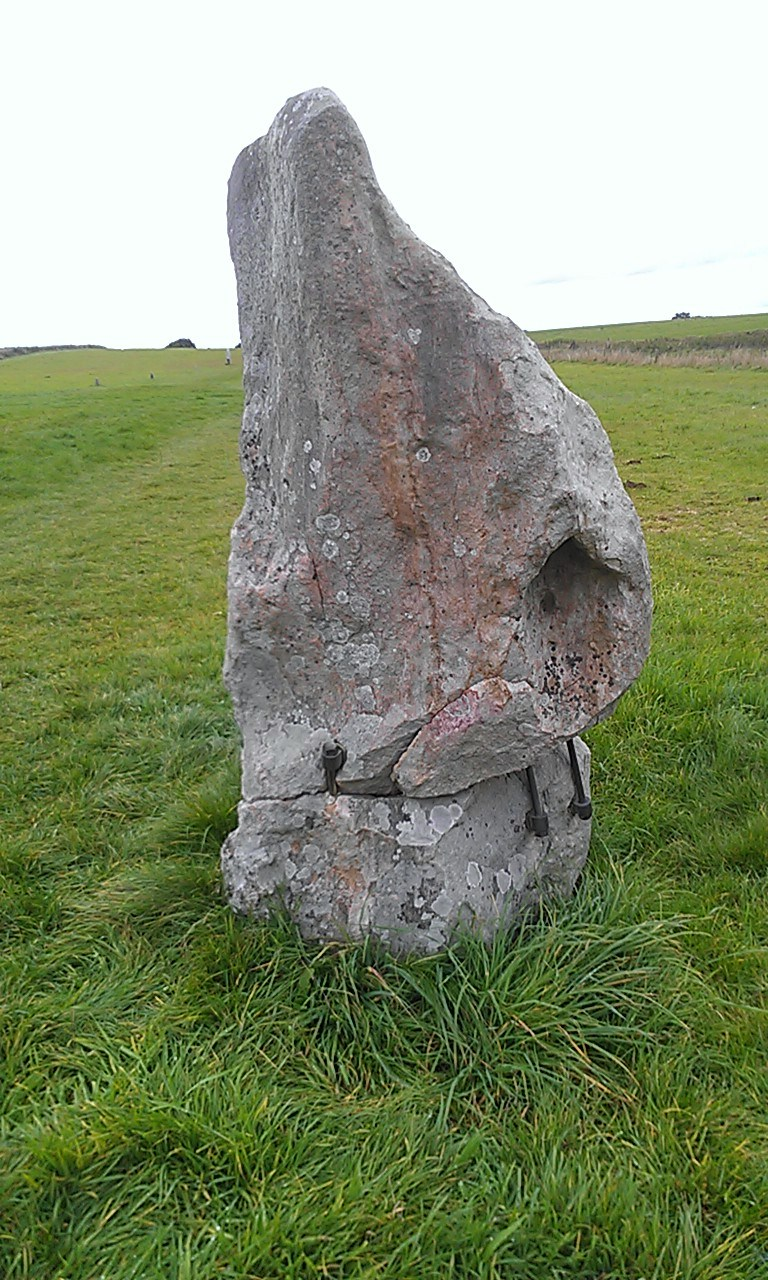
A megalith showing repairs

A view of the Avenue with concrete markers set in the place of missing stones by Alexander Keiller's excavation team.
