= Stonehenge, Avebury and Associated Sites =

World Heritage site in Wiltshire, England

UNESCO World Heritage Site
- Avebury and Stonehenge in Wiltshire

- Location within the United Kingdom
- Location: Wiltshire, England
- Includes: Stonehenge; Avebury
- Criteria: Cultural: (i), (ii), (iii)
- Reference: 373bis
- Inscription: 1986 (10th Session)
- Extensions: 2008
- Area: 4,985.4 ha (12,319 acres)
- Coordinates: 51°10′44″N 1°49′31″W

Stonehenge, Avebury and Associated Sites is a UNESCO World Heritage Site (WHS) in Wiltshire, England. The WHS covers two large areas of land separated by about 24 kilometres (15 mi), rather than a specific monument or building. The sites were inscribed as co-listings in 1986. Some large and well known monuments within the WHS are listed below, but the area also has an exceptionally high density of small-scale archaeological sites, particularly from the prehistoric period. More than 700 individual archaeological features have been identified. There are 160 separate scheduled monuments, covering 415 items or features.

== Stonehenge and associated monuments ==
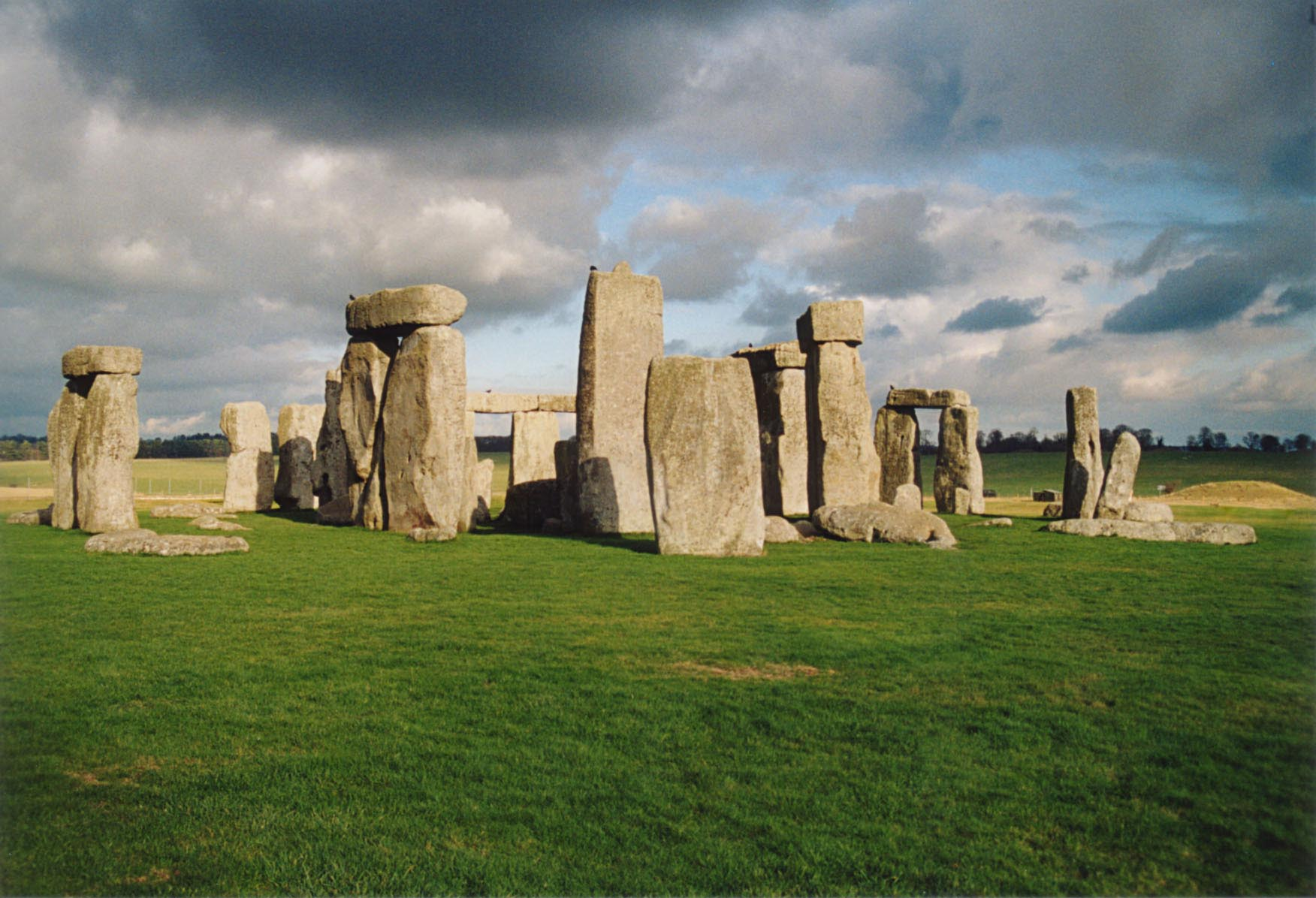
Stonehenge

Boundary and key sites for the Stonehenge section of the Stonehenge and Avebury World Heritage Site

The Stonehenge area of the WHS is in south Wiltshire. It covers an area of 26 square km and is centred on the prehistoric monument of Stonehenge. Ownership is shared between English Heritage, the National Trust, the Ministry of Defence, the RSPB, Wiltshire Council, and private individuals and farmers.

=== Monuments in the Stonehenge WHS ===
- Stonehenge
- Stonehenge Avenue
- Stonehenge Cursus
- The Lesser Cursus
- Cursus Barrows
- Durrington Walls
- Woodhenge
- Cuckoo Stone
- Coneybury Henge (has been ploughed flat)
- King Barrow Ridge
- Winterbourne Stoke Barrows
- Normanton Down Barrows, including Bush Barrow
- Vespasian's Camp
- Robin Hood's Ball (an associated monument just north of the WHS boundary)
- West Amesbury Henge, also known as Bluestonehenge

== Avebury and associated monuments ==
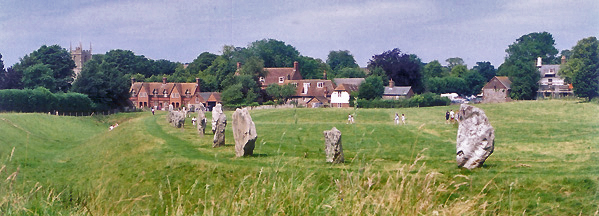
Avebury Henge and village

Boundary and key sites for the Avebury section of the Stonehenge and Avebury World Heritage Site

The Avebury area of the WHS covers an area of 22.5 km^{2} and is centred on the prehistoric Avebury Henge, about 17 miles (27 km) north of Stonehenge.

=== Monuments in the Avebury WHS ===
- Avebury Henge
- West Kennet Avenue
- Beckhampton Avenue
- West Kennet Long Barrow
- The Sanctuary
- Silbury Hill
- Windmill Hill

== Museum and archive collections ==
The main museums are the Alexander Keiler Museum at Avebury, Salisbury Museum, and Wiltshire Museum in Devizes.

Other museums with material from Stonehenge and Avebury include the British Museum, National Museum of Wales, Cambridge University Museum of Archaeology and Anthropology and the Ashmolean Museum. Other archives include the Historic England Archive in Swindon, the Wiltshire and Swindon History Centre in Chippenham, and the Bodleian Library at Oxford.

== See also ==
- Stonehenge Landscape – the land owned by the National Trust
- History of Wiltshire
