= Stonehenge Cursus =

Neolithic monument in Wiltshire, England

- Greater Cursus and Lesser Cursus
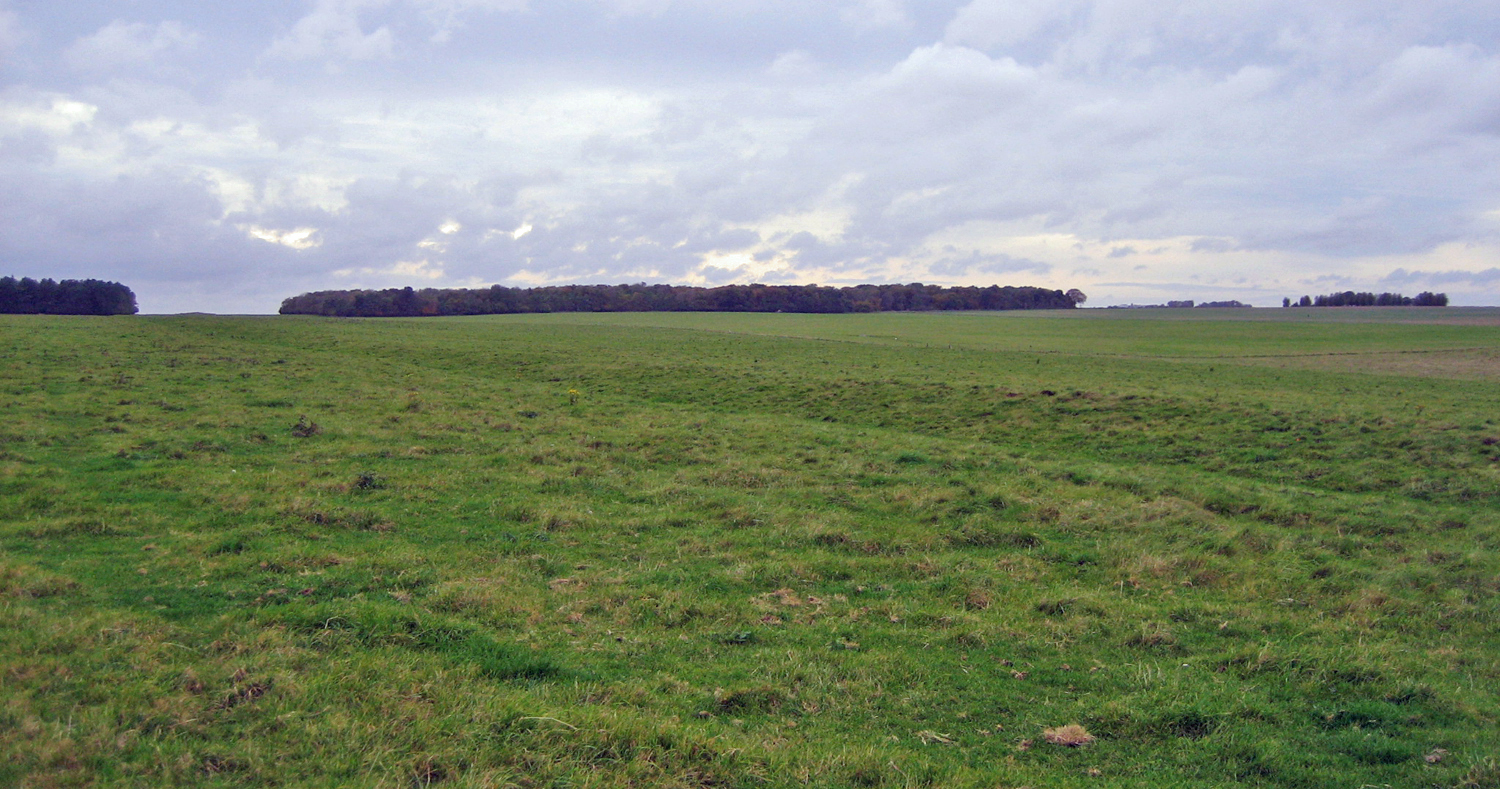
- The southern ditch and bank of the Cursus. It runs west to the gap in the trees.

- 51.186°N 1.826°W
- Type: Cursus
- Periods: Neolithic
- Location: Wiltshire
- Region: Salisbury Plain

History
- Built: 4th millennium BCE

Site notes
- Length: 2.76 kilometres (1.71 mi)
- Excavation dates: 1947, 2007
- Archaeologists: John FS Stone, Stonehenge Riverside Project
- Condition: Excellent
- Public access: Yes
- Website: National Trust

UNESCO World Heritage Site
- Designated: 1986
- Reference no.: 373

Scheduled monument
- Designated: 1952
- Reference no.: 1009132

The Stonehenge Cursus (sometimes known as the Greater Cursus) is a large Neolithic cursus monument on Salisbury plain, near to Stonehenge in Wiltshire, England. It is roughly 3 kilometres (1.9 mi) long and between 100 metres (330 ft) and 150 metres (490 ft) wide. Excavations in 2007 dated the construction of the earthwork to between 3630 and 3375 BCE, several hundred years before the earliest phase of Stonehenge in 3000 BC. The cursus, along with adjacent barrows and the nearby 'Lesser Cursus' are part of the National Trust's Stonehenge Landscape property, and is within the Stonehenge and Avebury World Heritage Site.

== Etymology ==
Cursus comes from the Latin for 'racecourse'. Early antiquarians who first discovered cursuses believed them to be Roman racing tracks.

== Context ==
Radiocarbon dating of a red deer antler pick discovered at the bottom of the western terminal ditch suggests that the Stonehenge Cursus was first constructed between 3630 and 3375 BCE. It is just under 3 km long, and is roughly 100 m wide. Because of a slight difference in the alignment of its north and south ditches, it widens to a point nearly 150 m near its western end. It is roughly aligned east–west and is oriented toward the sunrise on the spring and autumn equinoxes. There is a (later) Bronze Age round barrow inside the western end of the enclosure, and a large Neolithic long barrow was constructed at its east terminal. The Stonehenge Riverside Project excavated the remains of the long barrow in 2008 to determine if the barrow predated, or was contemporary with the cursus itself. The ditches of the cursus are not uniform and vary in width and depth. The eastern ditch is fairly shallow, as is the southern ditch – being only 0.75 m deep and 1.8 m wide at the top. At the western terminal, the ditch is 2 m deep and 2.75 m wide.

Like most cursuses, its function is unclear, although it is believed to be ceremonial. The length of the cursus, running roughly east west, crosses a dry river valley known as Stonehenge Bottom. This may have been a winterbourne during the Neolithic era. If so, this would give it similar characteristics to other cursus, such as the Dorset Cursus, and it may be related to a ceremonial function. It has also been suggested that the Stonehenge Cursus acts as a boundary between areas of settlement and ceremonial activity. The cursus is also aligned on the equinox sunrise which rises over the eastern long barrow.

Two artificial pits have been found near the east and west ends of the cursuses. It has been found that lines of sunrise and sunset at midsummer through these pits are aligned with Stonehenge.

== Excavation ==
William Stukeley was the first antiquarian to identify and record the Stonehenge Cursus, although he incorrectly assumed it to be Roman in origin. In 1947 John FS Stone excavated a small area of the southern ditch toward the west end of the cursus. He discovered a small chipping of bluestone and an antler pick in a specially dug recess that dated from approximately 2500 BCE.

In 2007, the Stonehenge Riverside Project dug three trenches at the western end of the cursus, discovering the antler pick at the western terminus ditch. A trench in the northern ditch uncovered a sherd of pottery tentatively dated to the 4th millennium BCE. A trench at the southern ditch found evidence of recuts into the original ditch, c. 2500 BCE (when Stone's antler was deposited), and again between 2000 and 1500 BCE.

== Amesbury 42 Long Barrow ==
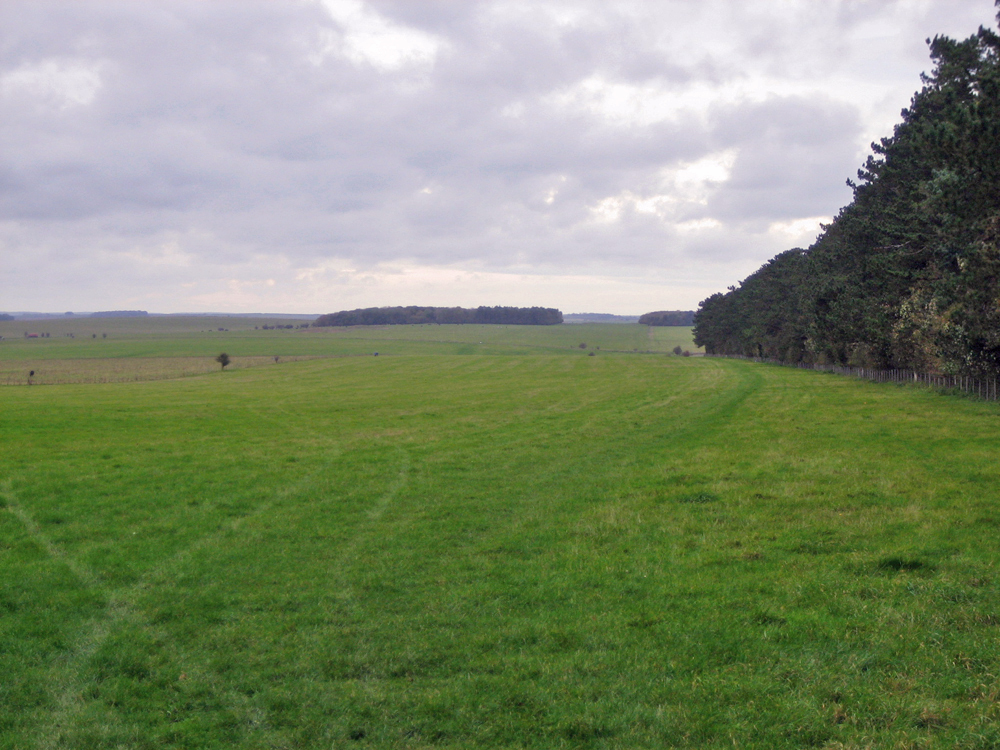
The cursus viewed from its eastern end. The gap in the trees on the horizon marks its western end.

Just beyond the eastern terminal of the Cursus is a Neolithic long barrow, oriented north–south. It was noted by William Stukeley in 1723 and Richard Colt Hoare in 1810, and was excavated by John Thurnam in 1868, recovering an ox skull and some secondary inhumations. The barrow has since been levelled and is now underneath a bridleway running along King Barrow Ridge. The 2 m deep eastern ditch of the barrow was excavated once in the 1980s by Julian Richards and his team for the Stonehenge Environs Project, although they failed to find any dateable material. The Stonehenge Riverside Project excavated the ditch once more in 2008.

In 1979 the Royal Commission on Historical Monuments recommended that the barrow should be better protected, by diverting the bridleway around it and clearing the woodland between it and the cursus, but the recommendation has yet to be implemented.

== Cursus round barrow cemetery ==
The Cursus Barrows Group is a round barrow cemetery located mostly south of the western end of the Stonehenge Cursus. It extends 1200 metres west-to-east along a ridge and measures 250 metres wide. It comprises the round barrows recorded as Amesbury 43 to 56 and Winterbourne Stoke 28 to 30, plus the Fargo hengiform.

== Lesser Cursus ==
750 m northwest of the western end of the Stonehenge Cursus lies the Lesser Cursus, a 400 m long and 60 m wide earthwork oriented west-southwest and east-northeast. Although its banks and ditches survived into the 20th century, ploughing since World War II has levelled it and it is only visible today as a cropmark. The Lesser Cursus has been a Scheduled Monument since 1925, and was excavated in 1983 as part of the Stonehenge Environs Project. They discovered that the original earthworks was only half its current length, but was then extended. They also confirmed, as had previously been suspected, that it had no eastern terminal. The ditches and banks simply stop leaving the eastern end open. The project also discovered several red deer antler picks that have dated the monument to approximately 3000 BCE.

== Access ==
The Stonehenge Cursus is entirely located in the Stonehenge Landscape property's open access land and is therefore free to visit. It is located 700 metres north of Stonehenge and is easily accessed via the public bridlepaths. The Lesser Cursus is on arable land, although a permissive path goes near it. However, as the Lesser Cursus is only visible as a cropmark, there is nothing to see. Amesbury 42 long barrow is under a bridleway at the far eastern end of the Greater Cursus.

== See also ==
- Stonehenge
- Stonehenge Landscape
