= Dorset Cursus =

Neolithic monument in southwest England

Coordinates: 50.9434°N 1.9752°W

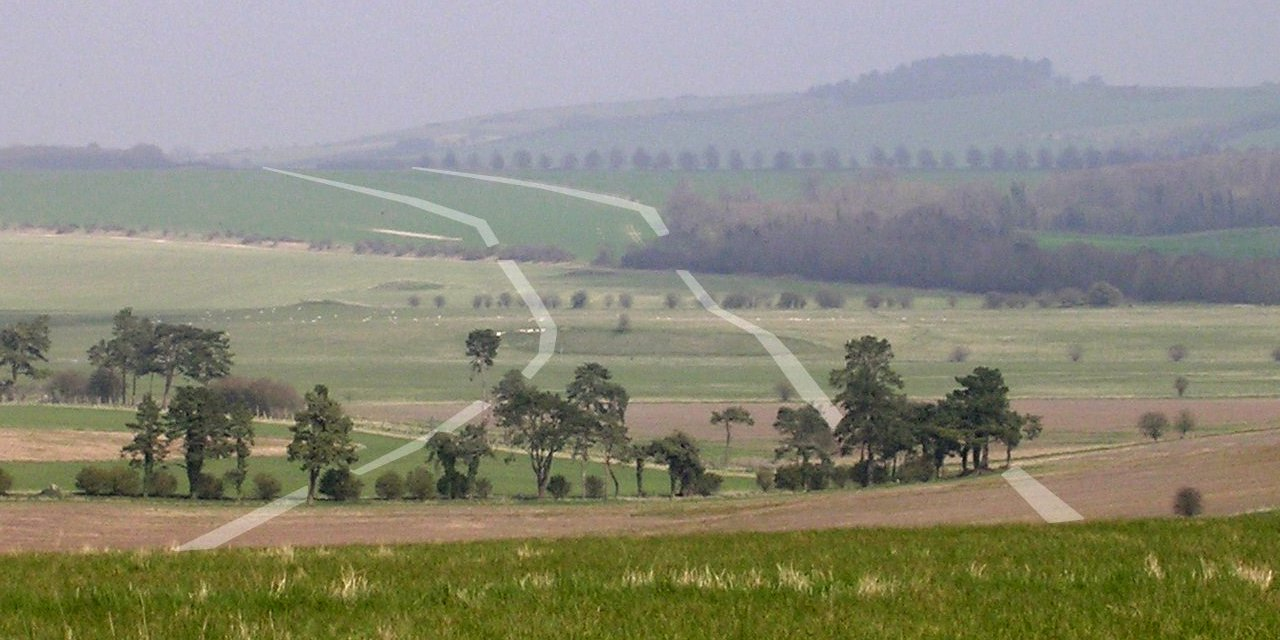
A view northeast from Gussage Down towards Bottlebush Down - the approximate course of the Cursus banks are superimposed in white. The round barrows on Wyke Down can be seen in the centre of the photo. The cursus has a slight change of direction as it climbs Bottlebush Down and it is thought that the original terminal of the cursus was at this point (and was later extended another 4.5 km north-east to Martin Down).

The Dorset Cursus is a Neolithic cursus monument that spans across 10 km (6¼ miles) of the chalk downland of Cranborne Chase in east Dorset, United Kingdom. Its extreme length makes it a notable example of this class of linear earthwork; it is better interpreted as a pair of same-length cursus constructed end to end, with the more southerly cursus (the Gussage Cursus) pre-dating the northerly one (the Pentridge Cursus).

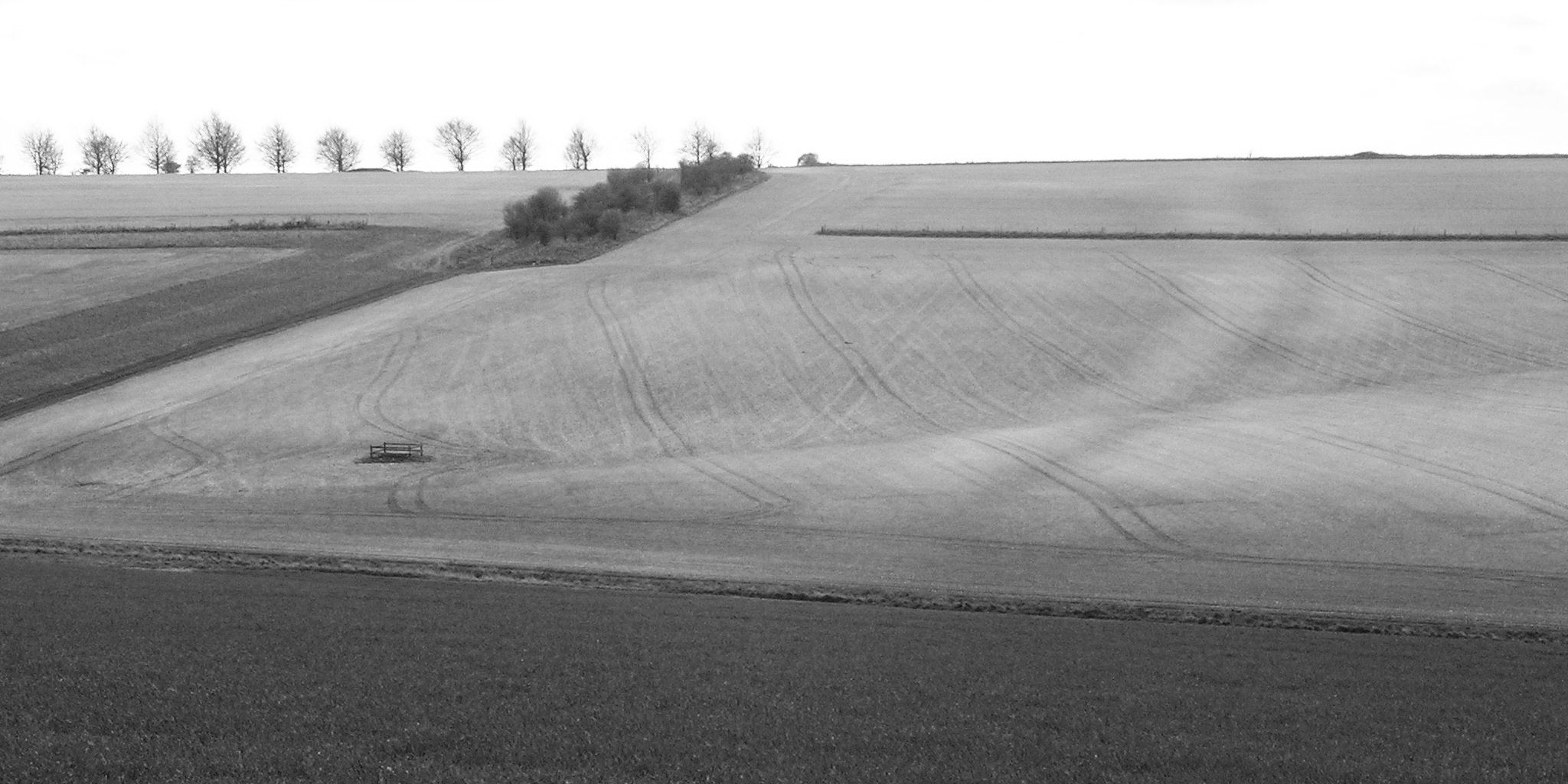
Most of the cursus earthworks have long since been destroyed and its course is only visible as soilmarks when conditions are favourable. Looking southwest from the edge of Salisbury Plantation, the course of the northern bank and ditch is visible as a dark stripe gently meandering down the hillslope (towards the right of this photo). The southern bank is just inside the field boundary (towards the left of the photo).

== Context ==
Very little remains above ground of the Dorset Cursus, which once stretched for 10 km (6¼ miles) through the undulating chalkland of Cranborne Chase in east Dorset, from Martin Down to Thickthorn Down (both near the A354 road). It is by far the largest example of this class of ancient monument: it is over three times longer than the archetypical Great Cursus near Stonehenge. Most of the current knowledge about the course of this ancient earthwork comes from aerial photography (where its course can be seen as cropmarks or soil marks) and other geophysical surveying techniques. However, there are a few locations (mentioned below) where the banks, much reduced in size, are still visible; the best-preserved earthworks are those of the southwestern terminal on Thickthorn Down (grid reference ST969124).

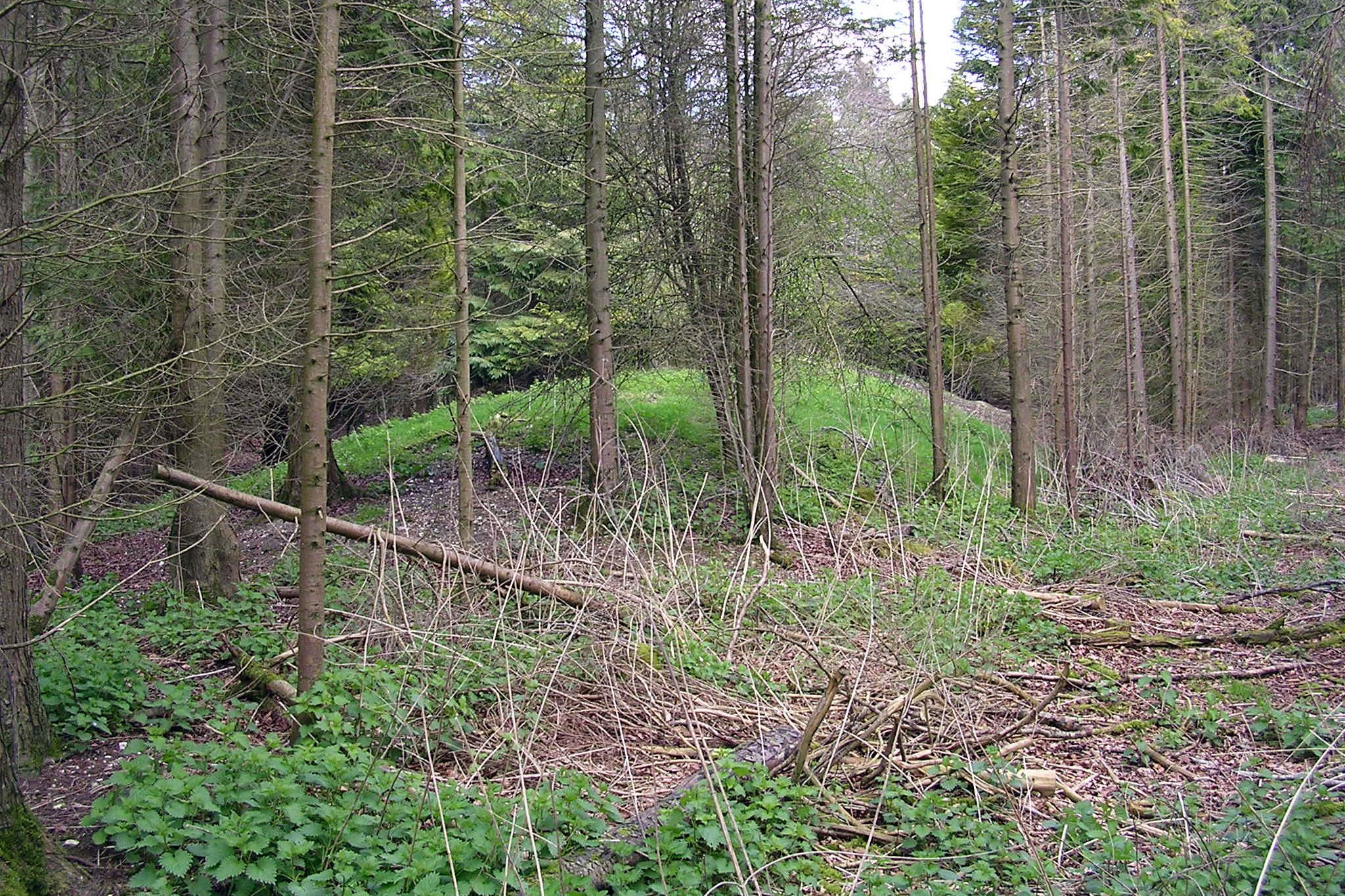
This long barrow at grid reference SU025169 is intimately related to the Dorset Cursus, in that it is incorporated into the northern bank. The barrow is very closely aligned with the Cursus (NE-SW) but its greater prominence would have made it clearly distinguishable from the bank. It is suggested that the barrow pre-dates the Cursus, and its direct inclusion into the structure of the Cursus implies a strong connection between the long barrows and the purpose of the Cursus.

The Cursus dates from 3300 BCE which makes it contemporary with the earthen long barrows on Cranborne Chase: many of these are found near, on, or within the Cursus and since they are still in existence they help trace the Cursus' course in the modern landscape. The relationship between the Cursus and the alignment of these barrows suggests that they had a common ritual significance to the Neolithic people who spent an estimated 0.5 million worker-hours in its construction.

Diagram showing a longitudinal section along the route of the Dorset Cursus.

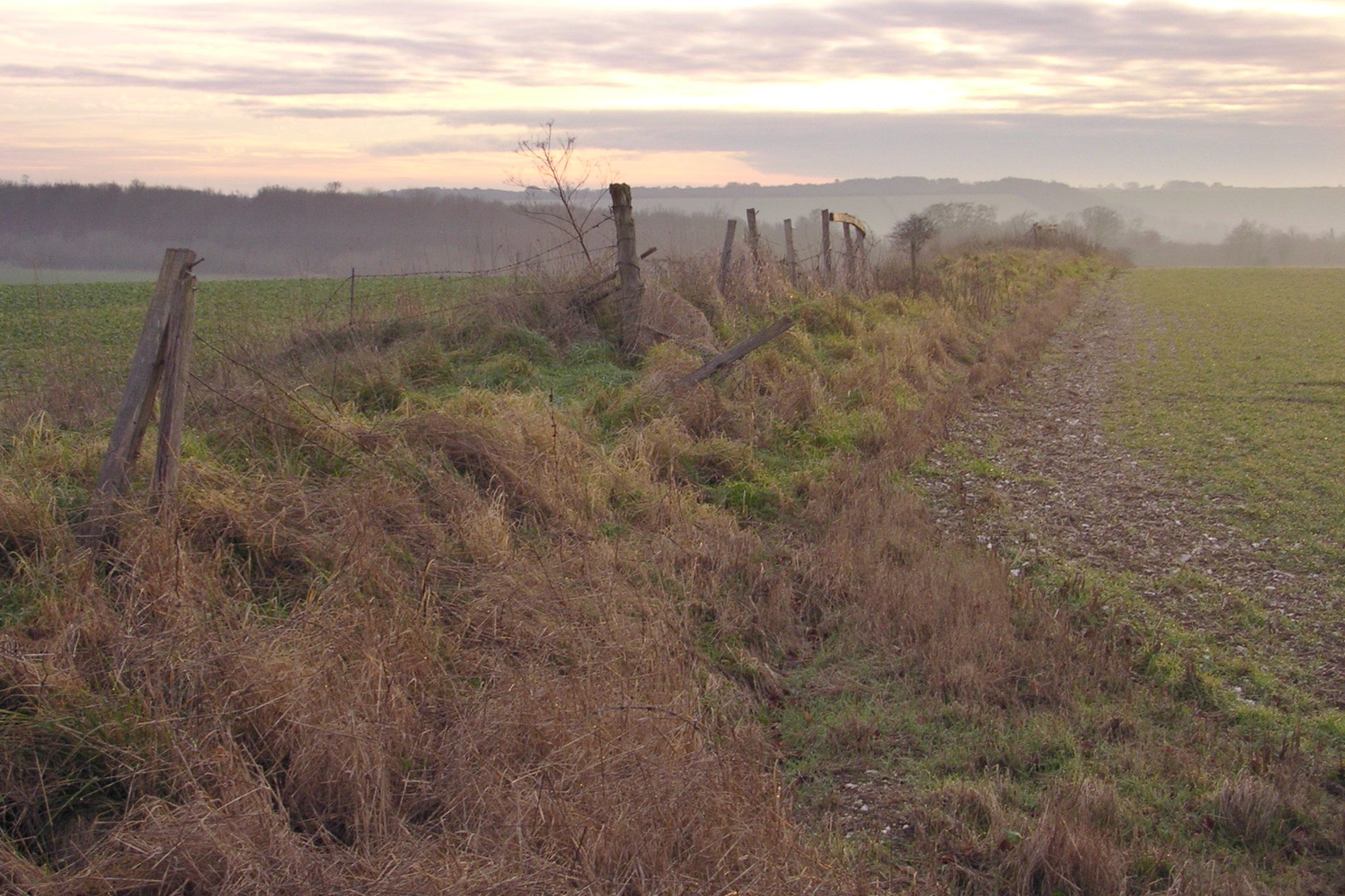
A surviving section of the Cursus' southern bank on the ridge of Bottlebush Down (grid reference SU016163), at right angles to the B3081 road.

== Physical details ==
The Cursus consisted of a pair of parallel banks (1.5 m tall) running about 82 m apart, with external ditches 1.5 m deep and 2 m wide. One bank is regular, whilst the other meanders, suggesting that the former was laid out first and the latter was dug using the former as a reference. The remains of these banks are still visible within Salisbury Plantation on Oakley Down, where a long barrow is built into the northwest bank (grid reference SU025169). A 250 m length of the south-east bank remains on the northeast-facing slope of Bottlebush Down (grid reference SU019161, at right angles to the B3081 road). These banks were linked together by cross-banks at the terminals; of these only the southwestern terminal bank on Thickthorn Down remains (grid reference ST969124), the north-eastern terminal on Martin Down (grid reference SU040191) has been removed by centuries of ploughing.

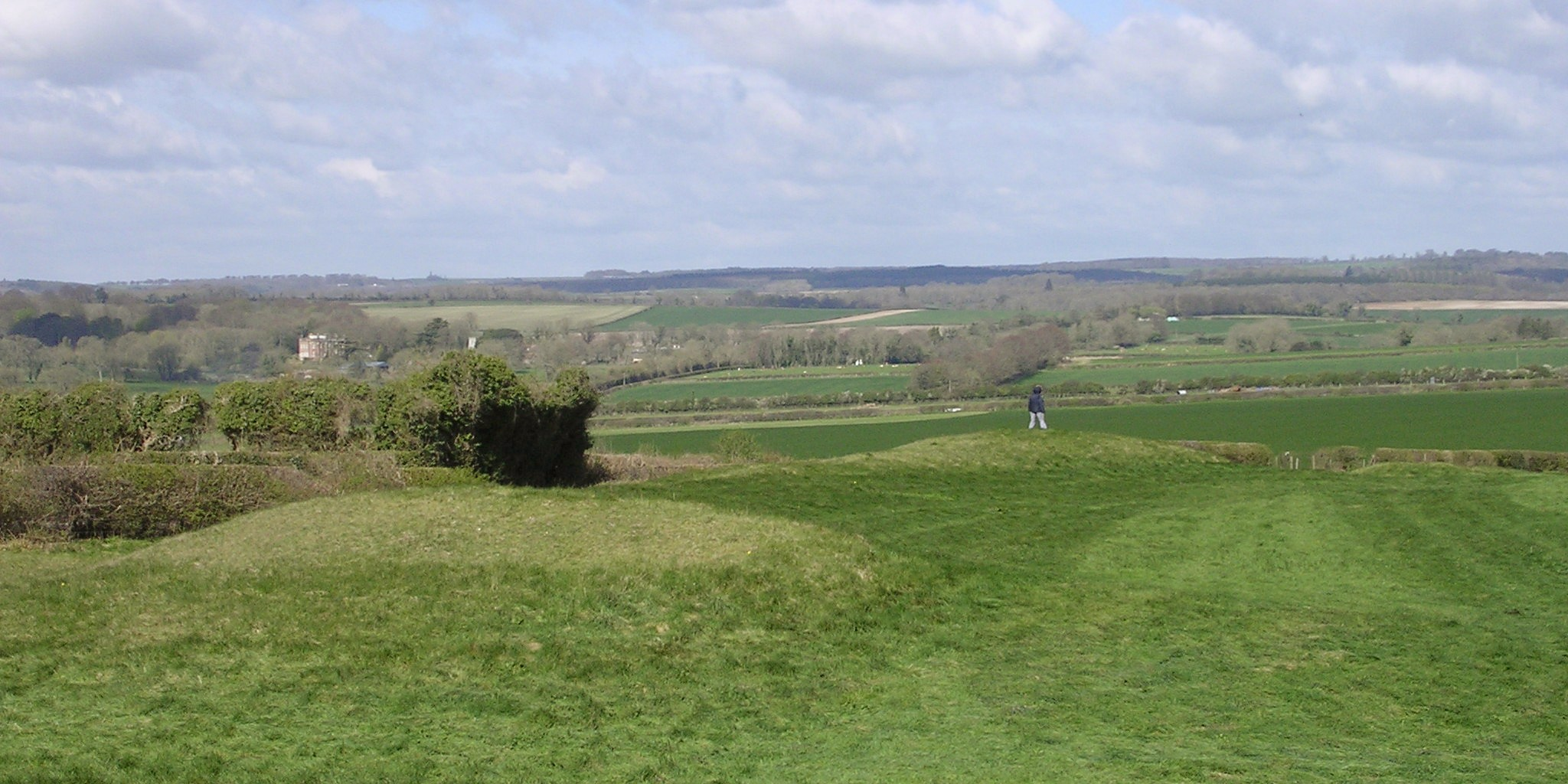
The earthworks of the Cursus' southwestern terminal on Thickthorn Down. The enlarged bank ends can be clearly seen, and the end of the cursus is squared off with a terminal bank about 100 m in length. The course of the Cursus heads off to the right of the photo.

The overall orientation of the Cursus is northeast–southwest; it does not follow a perfectly straight line between its terminals, but consists of several straight sections (of varying lengths) with abrupt but small changes in direction. It is believed that the cursus was built in two separate phases. First the 5.6 km (3.5 mi) southwesterly section from Thickthorn Down to Bottlebush Down, sometimes referred to as the Gussage Cursus. This was later extended another 4.3 km (2.7 mi) northeast, from Bottlebush Down to the terminal on Martin Down.

The quasi-linear course of the Cursus means that it ignores topographical features of the landscape. It is by no means flat, and there is also no overall 'downhill' direction. In fact the vertical profile of the Gussage Cursus is quite symmetric: it has the ridge of Gussage Down in the middle, with river valleys on either side and the terminals near the summits of the neighbouring ridges. The later Pentridge Cursus has one steep valley crossing (between Bottlebush Down and Salisbury Plantation) and beyond that it stops traversing the contours and follows them instead, gently undulating its way towards the terminal on Martin Down.

== Interpretation ==
In the absence of any evidence for a more mundane purpose, it is assumed that the Cursus served a religious or ceremonial function. There is considerable speculation about the links between the 'ritual landscape' and the course of the Cursus. The Cursus' only significant astronomical alignment is related to its southwesterly orientation: an observer at the Gussage Cursus terminal on Bottlebush Down would see the midwinter sun set behind the long barrow lying across the Cursus on the ridge of Gussage Down. It has been suggested that any processions along the Cursus would take place from the Martin Down terminal in a southwesterly direction for maximum visual impact (of natural and artificial features) along the route.

Archaeological excavation of the eastern ditch indicated that it was permitted to silt up rapidly and may therefore have fallen out of use quite soon after being built before being re-appropriated by later peoples. Later Bronze Age sites such as the barrow cemeteries on Oakley and Wyke Downs appear to have respected the presence of the Cursus. This is in contrast to the Roman engineers who built the Ackling Dyke road across the middle of the cursus on Wyke Down, and also cut across the barrows in the Oakley Down cemetery.
