= Cursus (disambiguation) =

Cursus (Latin: way):

- Cursus — a type of Neolithic monuments on British islands
- Cursus or Cursus publicus — governmental transportation system in Ancient Rome, preimage of modern post
  - Cursus velox — quick transport
  - Cursus clabularis — heavy transport
- Cursus — a rhythmic pattern in the end of the sentence in Late Latin (— means stressed syllables):
  - Cursus planus — pattern "— x x — x".
  - Cursus tardus — pattern "— x x — x x".
  - Cursus velox — pattern "— x x x x — x"
- Cursus — race type in Ancient Rome

== Other ==
- Cursus honorum — a sequence of magistracies for Roman politician.
- Cursus mathematicus — Latin-French course in mathematics.
