= Cundrovec =

- Location in Slovenia
- Coordinates: 45°55′27.88″N 15°36′27.07″E
- Country: Slovenia
- Traditional region: Styria
- Statistical region: Lower Sava
- Municipality: Brežice

Area
  - Total: 1.9 km^{2} (0.73 sq mi)
- Elevation: 152.1 m (499 ft)

Population (2020)
  - Total: 132
  - Density: 69/km^{2} (180/sq mi)

Cundrovec (pronounced [ˈtsuːndɾɔʋəts], German: Zundrovetz) is a settlement north of Brežice in eastern Slovenia. The area is part of the traditional region of Styria. It is now included in the Lower Sava Statistical Region.

Aerial surveys have shown a large rectangular area enclosed by walls that indicates the presence of a Roman military camp in the area.
