= Crop mark =

Crop mark may refer to:

- Crop marks, marks placed at the corners of a printed page to indicate where the page is to be trimmed
- Cropmark, in archaeology, differential growth indicating buried sites, also spelt 'crop mark'
- Crop circle
