= Shadow marks =

Archaeological feature, visible from the air

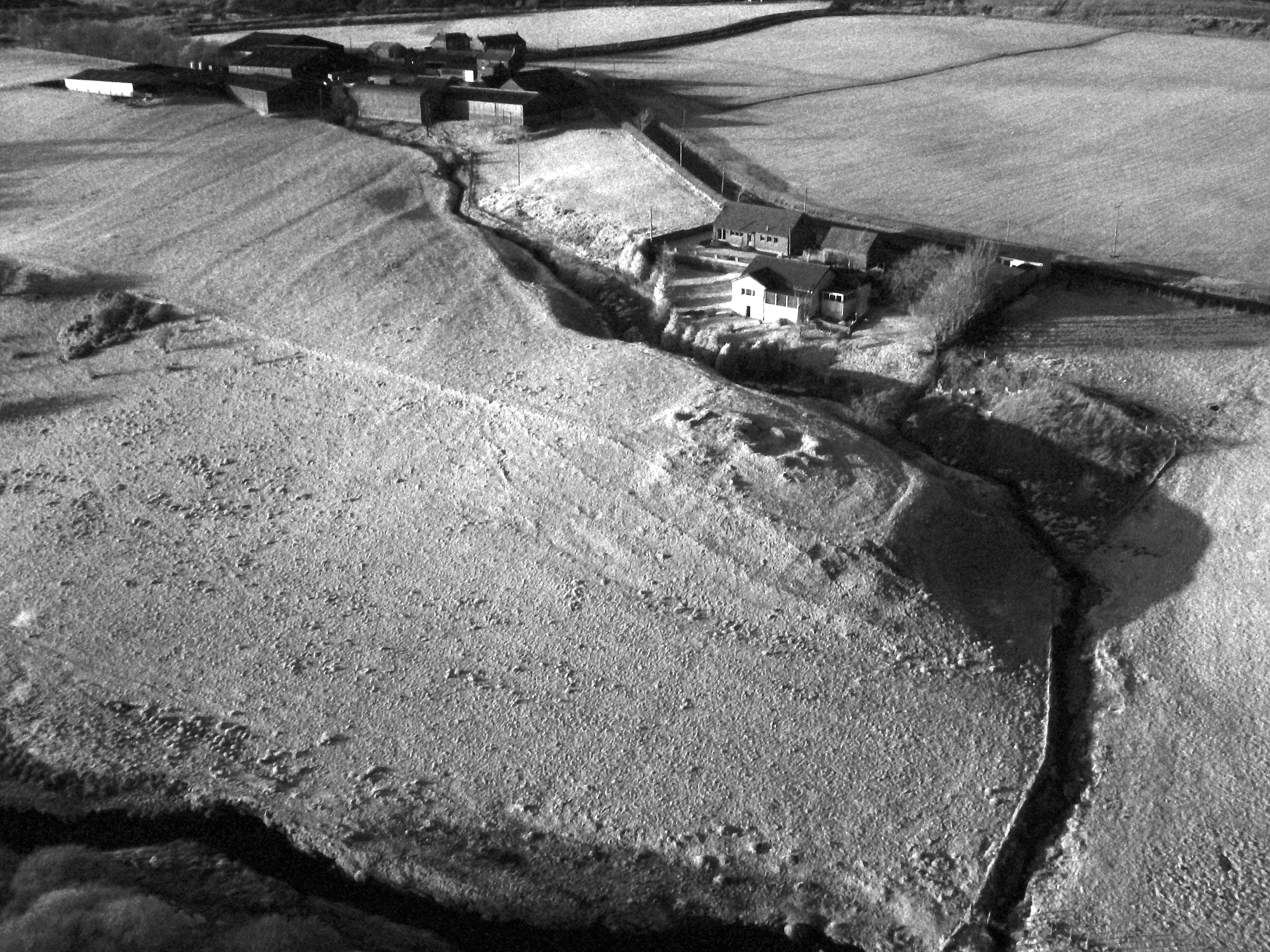
Kite aerial photo of the site of Ogilface Castle, Woodend, West Lothian in low sunlight

Shadow marks (shadow relief) are a form of archaeological feature visible from the air. Unlike cropmarks, frost marks and soil marks, they require upstanding features to work and are, therefore, more commonly seen in the context of extant sites rather than previously undiscovered buried ones.

They are caused by the differences in height on the ground produced by archaeological remains. In the case of ancient, eroded earthworks, these differences are often small and they are most apparent when viewed from the air, when the sun is low in the sky. This causes long shadows to be cast by the higher features, which are illuminated from one side by the sun, with dark shadows marking hollows and depressions.

Artificial shadow marks can be created easily by constructing a virtual model of a site, by merging aerial images (photogrammetry) and then vectoring in a virtual light source from any direction and at any angle.

== See also ==
- Archaeological field survey
- Cropmark
- Aerial archaeology
