= J. F. S. Stone =

British archaeologist (1899–1957)

John Frederick Smerdon Stone (20 July 1899 – 12 May 1957) was a British archaeologist, most famous for his work in and around Wiltshire, especially at Stonehenge and the Woodhenge area.

Stone was born in Bath, Somerset. In 1947, Stone excavated the first ever trench across the Stonehenge cursus, at a site near the Fargo Plantation a little north west of the stone circle. This permitted its dating for the first time and Stone was able to establish its prehistoric date and that it had been constructed using antler picks in irregular sections. In the cursus ditch fill, he also found a piece of Welsh stone, incorrectly described as a fragment from the Cosheston Beds of Milford Haven. Coupled with the finds of bluestone fragments found between the cursus and Stonehenge, Stone hypothesised that an earlier bluestone monument, predating the megalithic stages of Stonehenge, had stood near the cursus and been subsequently moved and re-erected on its current spot.

In 1950, Stone joined R. J. C. Atkinson and Stuart Piggott in an excavation at Stonehenge itself. Commissioned by the Society of Antiquaries, their work recovered many cremations and developed the phasing that still dominates much of what is written about Stonehenge.
