= Nile Clumps =

The Nile Clumps
- Forest
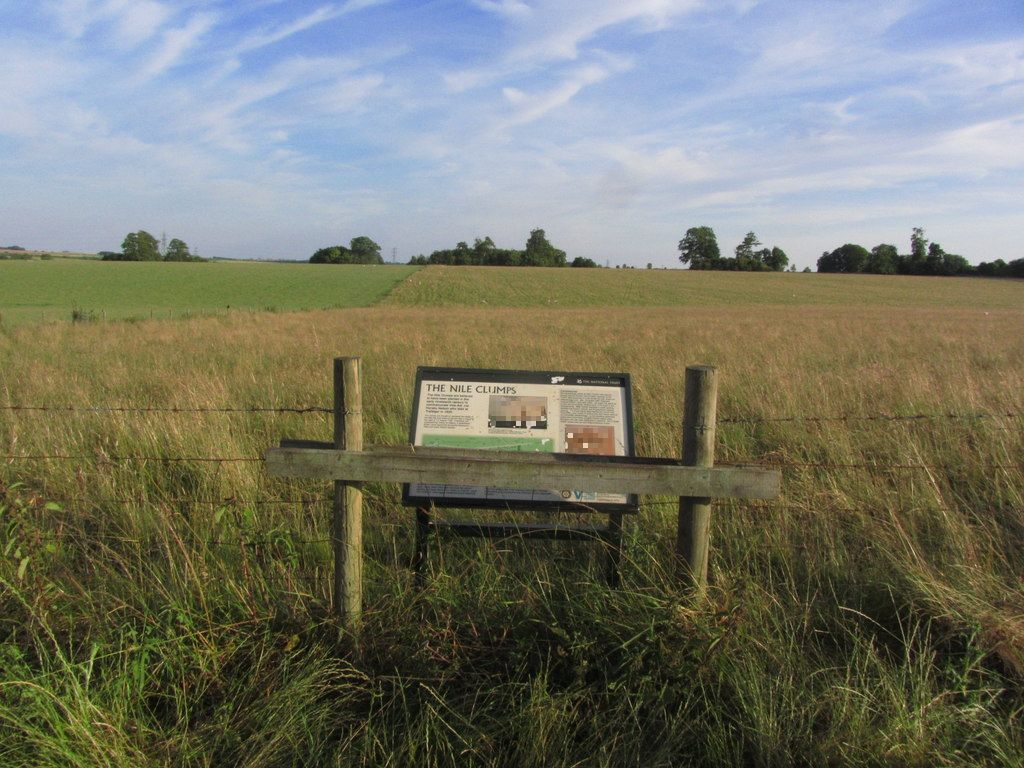
- The Nile Clumps (which are on private land) seen from an information board on a public bridleway

- Location in Wiltshire
- Coordinates: 51.178°N 1.803°W
- Location: Wiltshire, England, UK

The Nile Clumps are a series of tree clumps just west of Amesbury on Salisbury Plain in Wiltshire, England, planted in the early 19th century purportedly to commemorate the Battle of the Nile.

== Planting ==
Between 1 and 3 August 1798 a British fleet, under Admiral Horatio Nelson, defeated a French fleet, under François-Paul Brueys d'Aigalliers, in Aboukir Bay, in the Battle of the Nile. The French fleet consisted of thirteen ships of the line and four frigates, while Nelson had fourteen ships of the line. All but four of the French ships were destroyed or captured; no British ships were lost.

After Nelson's death at the Battle of Trafalgar, it is believed that Charles Douglas, 6th Marquess of Queensberry – a friend of Nelson's mistress, Emma Hamilton – planted clumps of beech trees on his Amesbury Abbey estate to commemorate him, as part of an expansion of the parkland to the north and west of the house. Each clump represented the location of a British or French ship at a particular point in the battle.

There may have been as many as twenty-six clumps originally, spread out over three-quarters of a mile.

== Today ==
Seventeen clumps remain today and are under preservation orders. However, as beech has a natural life of some 200 years, many are dying off. Around 2005, several clumps were replanted by local volunteers, each with about 200 mixed trees including beech, maple and hawthorn. Amongst the clumps that have been replanted are those for Swiftsure, Defence, L'Orient and Bellerophon.

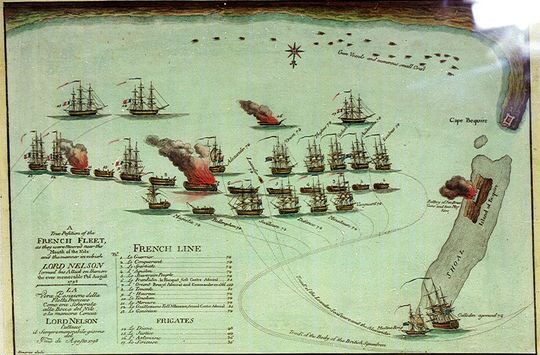
The map by Robert Dodd from which the clumps layout is said to be taken.

The evidence that the clumps were planted to commemorate the battle is based on local lore and a similarity between the layout of the woods and the position of ships shown in Robert Dodd's map of the battle. The UK National Maritime Museum has also suggested that the link between the Battle of the Nile and the clumps is "quite likely".

Most of the surviving clumps stand on the north side of the A303 to the west of Amesbury and inside the Stonehenge World Heritage Site, although several used to stand south and along the course of the road. Several of the remaining clumps stand on land owned by the National Trust's Stonehenge Landscape property.

== Other memorial woods ==
A plaque on the Nelson Memorial at Swarland, Northumberland mentions a line of trees in the shape of the coastline of the Nile Delta, with other trees in the positions of the British and French ships, to the west of the monument. Aerial photographs suggest that the trees may be at 55°19′10.72″N 1°44′20.25″W.

The Nile Clumps are sometimes incorrectly referred to as the Trafalgar Clumps. In 2005, a Trafalgar Woods project organised by the Woodland Trust and the Society for Nautical Research aimed to plant 250,000 trees in a series of woods across the UK, to commemorate the 2005 bicentenary of the Battle of Trafalgar. The 27 new woods each represented a ship which took part in the battle, the largest being Victory Wood in Kent.

== See also ==
- Monuments and memorials to Horatio Nelson, 1st Viscount Nelson
