= Thickthorn Down Long Barrows =

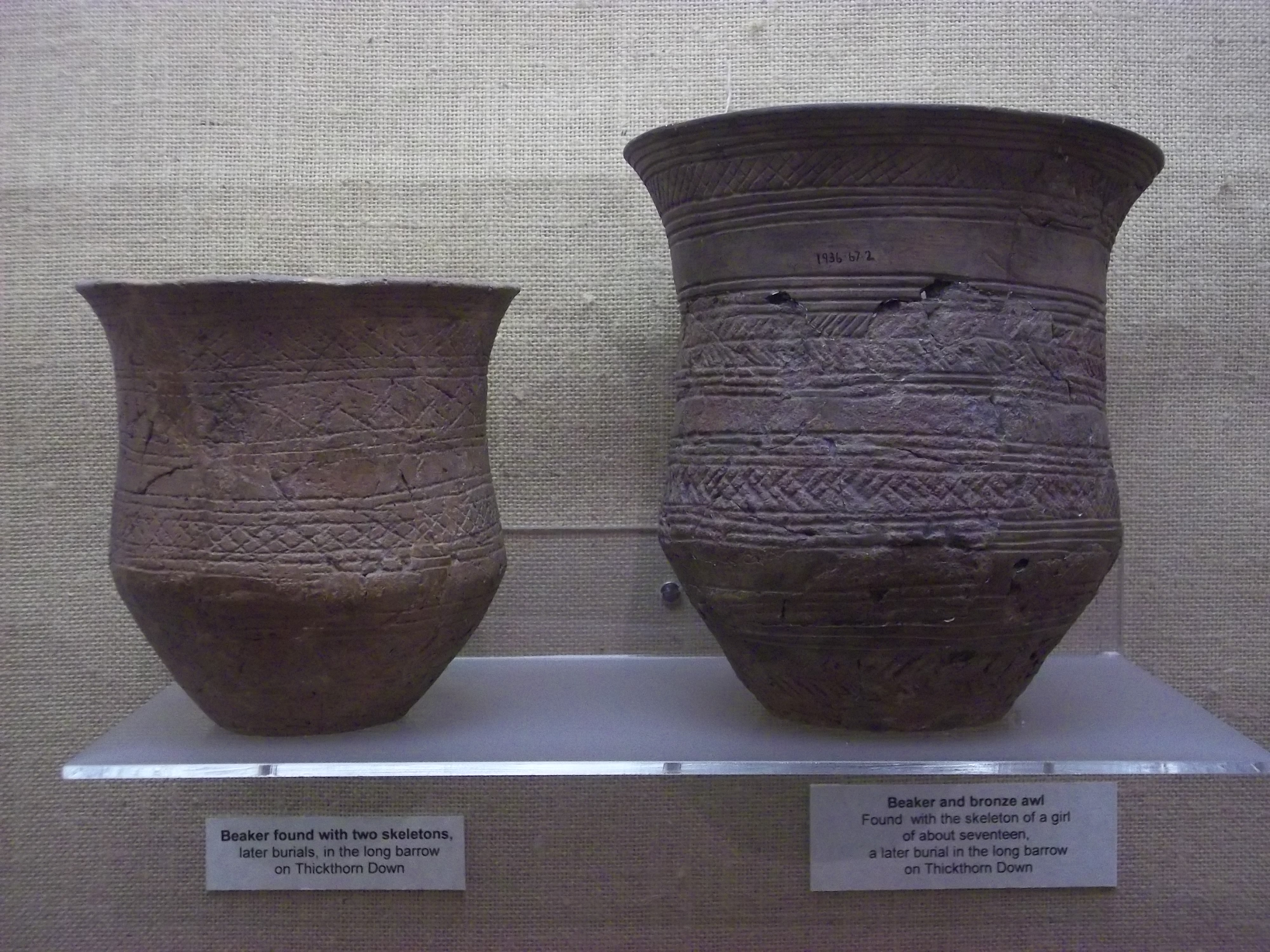
- Bell-beakers found with secondary burials in the excavated barrow on Thickthorn Down. In the Dorset Museum.

- Location within Dorset
- 50°54′36″N 2°2′31″W
- Periods: Neolithic
- Location: near Gussage St Michael, Dorset
- OS grid reference: ST 971 123

Site notes
- Excavation dates: 1933
- Archaeologists: Stuart Piggott, C. D. Drew

Scheduled monument
- Designated: 24 March 1958
- Reference no.: 1002708

The Thickthorn Down Long Barrows are two Neolithic long barrows, near the village of Gussage St Michael in Dorset, England. They are near the south-western end of the Dorset Cursus, a Neolithic feature. The long barrows are a scheduled monument.

== Description ==
The long barrows are situated on a ridge on Thickthorn Down. The barrow to the north-west, which is unexcavated, is rectangular, 44 by 18 metres (144 by 59 ft), and 2.4 metres (7 ft 10 in) high; there is an incomplete ditch around the barrow. It is aligned north-west to south-east, and is immediately south-east of the south-western terminus of the Dorset Cursus. It is thought that the bank at the end of the cursus, which is at an oblique angle to its sides but is aligned with the barrow, was designed to link to the existing monument.

The second barrow, a short distance along the ridge to the south-east, is also aligned north-west to south-east. It is rectangular, 30 by 18 metres (98 by 59 ft), and 2.4 metres (7 ft 10 in) high. There is a ditch around all except the south-east end, where there is a causeway.

=== Excavation ===
The south-eastern barrow was excavated in 1933 by C. D. Drew and Stuart Piggott, and carefully restored. There were three post-holes on the causeway, one being on the central axis of the mound. There were no primary burials, but in the centre there was a structure consisting of two turf walls with a filling between of chalk rubble. The excavators suggested that the mound had been preceded by this structure, but it has more recently been suggested that the monument was constructed as a series of bays divided by hurdles.

There were three secondary burials in the south-west side, two of them accompanied by beakers. In the ditch, mostly at the ends near the causeway, there were stratified finds including pottery of the Early Neolithic period and later Peterborough ware.
