= Cursus =

Neolithic earthwork

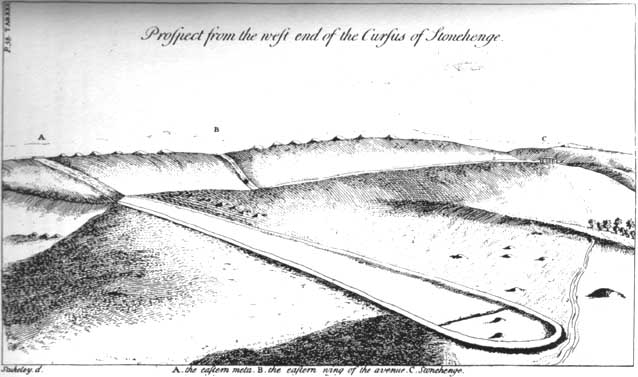
A view of the Stonehenge Cursus, drawn by the documenter and namer of the structures, William Stukeley, in 1740

A Cursus is a monumental Neolithic enclosure structure comprising parallel banks with external ditches or trenches. Found only in the islands of Great Britain and Ireland, relics within them indicate that they were built between 3400 and 3000 BC, making them among the oldest monumental structures on the islands. The name 'cursus' was suggested in 1723 by the antiquarian William Stukeley, who compared the Stonehenge cursus to a Roman chariot-racing track, or circus.

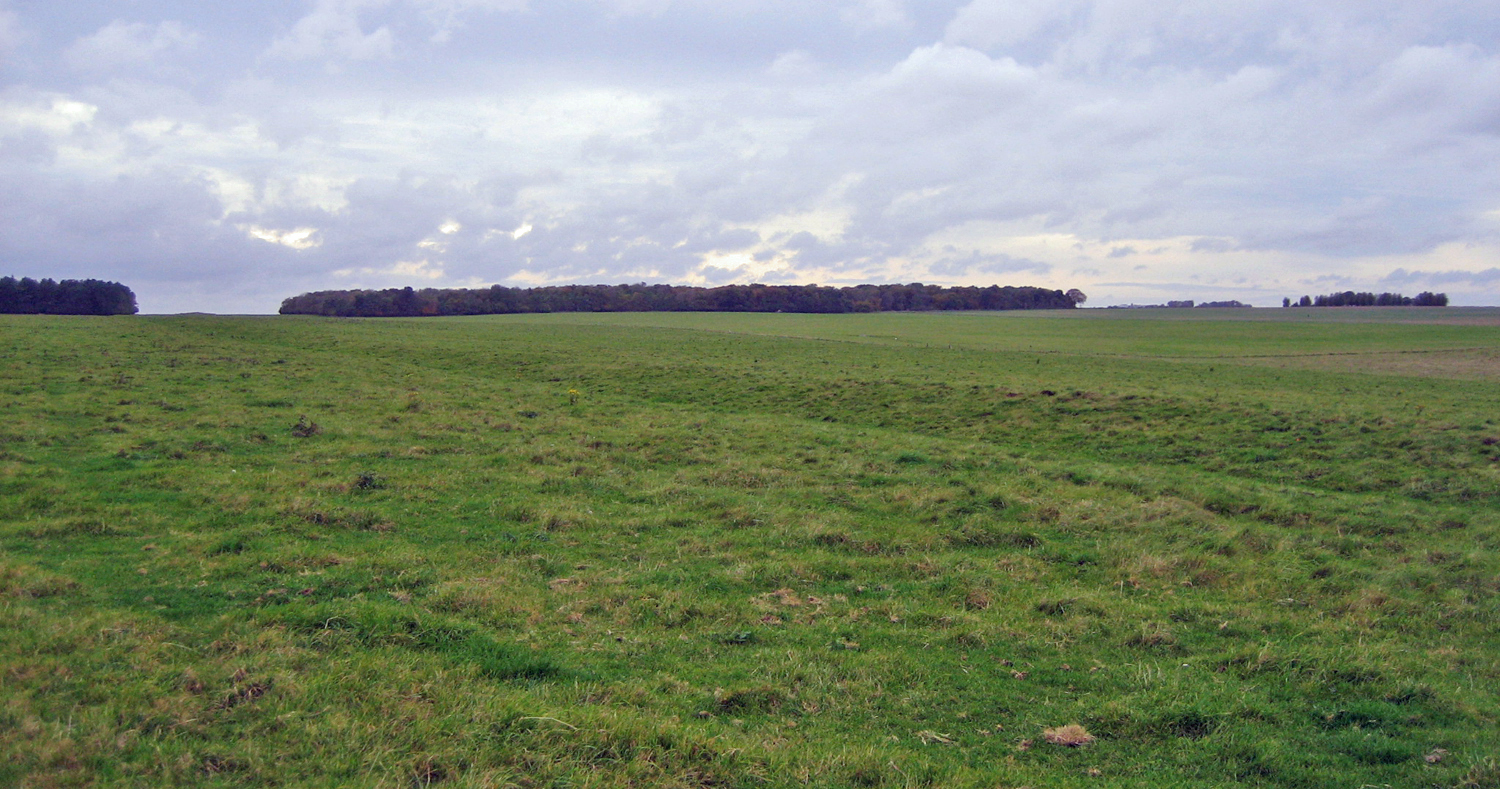
Stonehenge Cursus, Wiltshire

Cursuses range in length from 50 yards (46 m) to almost 6 miles (9.7 km). The distance between the parallel earthworks can be up to 100 yards (91 m). Banks at the terminal ends enclose the cursus. Over fifty have been identified via aerial photography while many others have doubtless been obliterated by farming and other activities.

The Stonehenge Cursus is a notable example within sight of the more famous Stonehenge stone circle. Other examples are the four cursuses at Rudston in Yorkshire, that at Fornham All Saints in Suffolk, the Cleaven Dyke in Perthshire and the Dorset cursus. The Bures cursus and the Metlands cursus are in Bures St Mary, Suffolk, and were detected from cropmarks. They are situated just above the floodplain of the north bank of the River Stour, Suffolk. On 21 December each year the sun rises over Lodge Hills, Wormingford, and shines down the length of the Metlands cursus.

In the summer of 2023 excavation began at a cursus discovered near Drumadoon on the Isle of Arran in 2019. It is believed to be the only complete example in Britain. Archaeologists from Glasgow University co-led by Dr Kenneth Brophy and local volunteers began excavating at the site in August. Brophy judged the Arran cursus the most significant he had seen in his career.

== Function ==
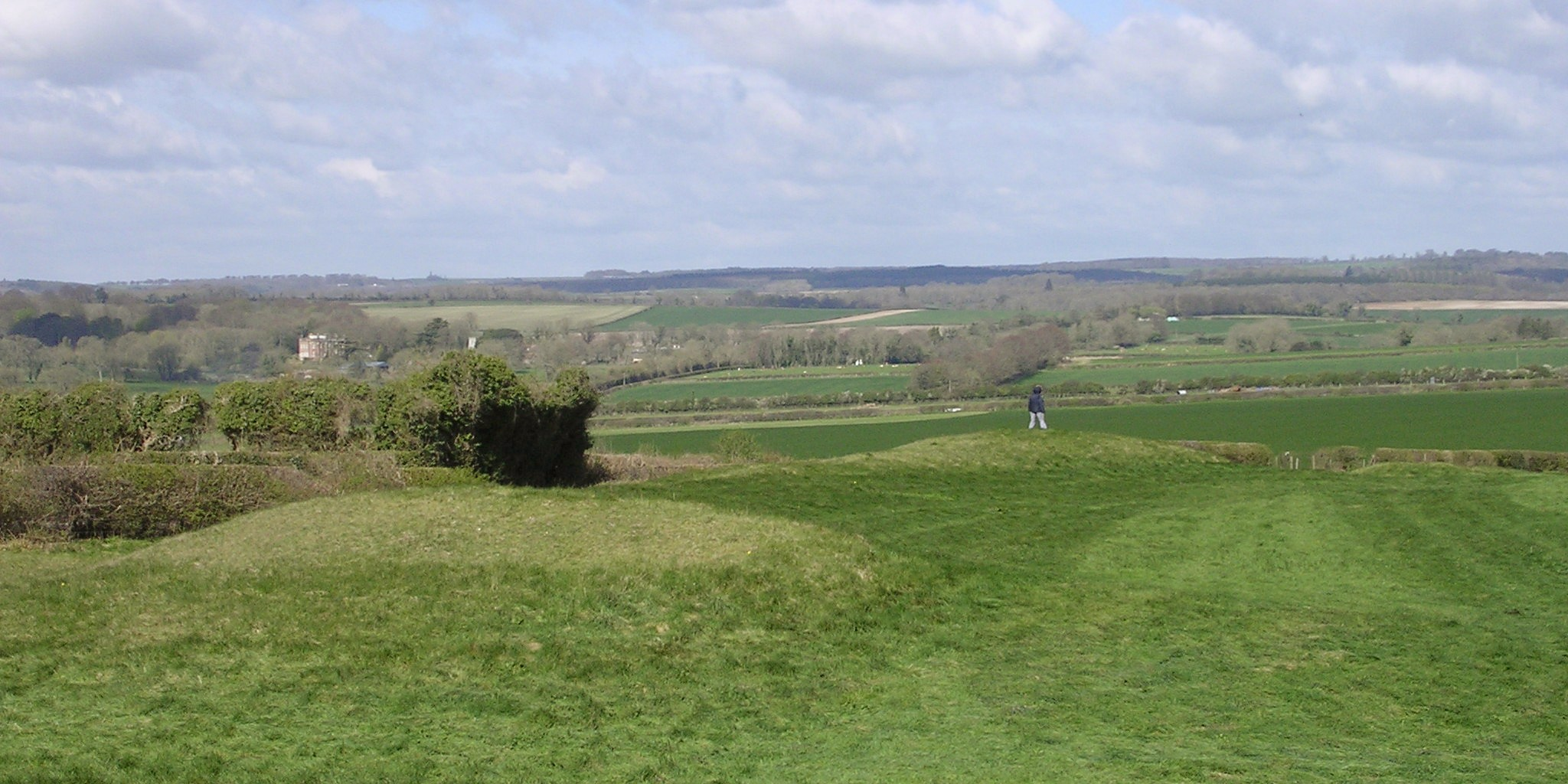
Dorset Cursus terminal on Thickthorn Down, Dorset

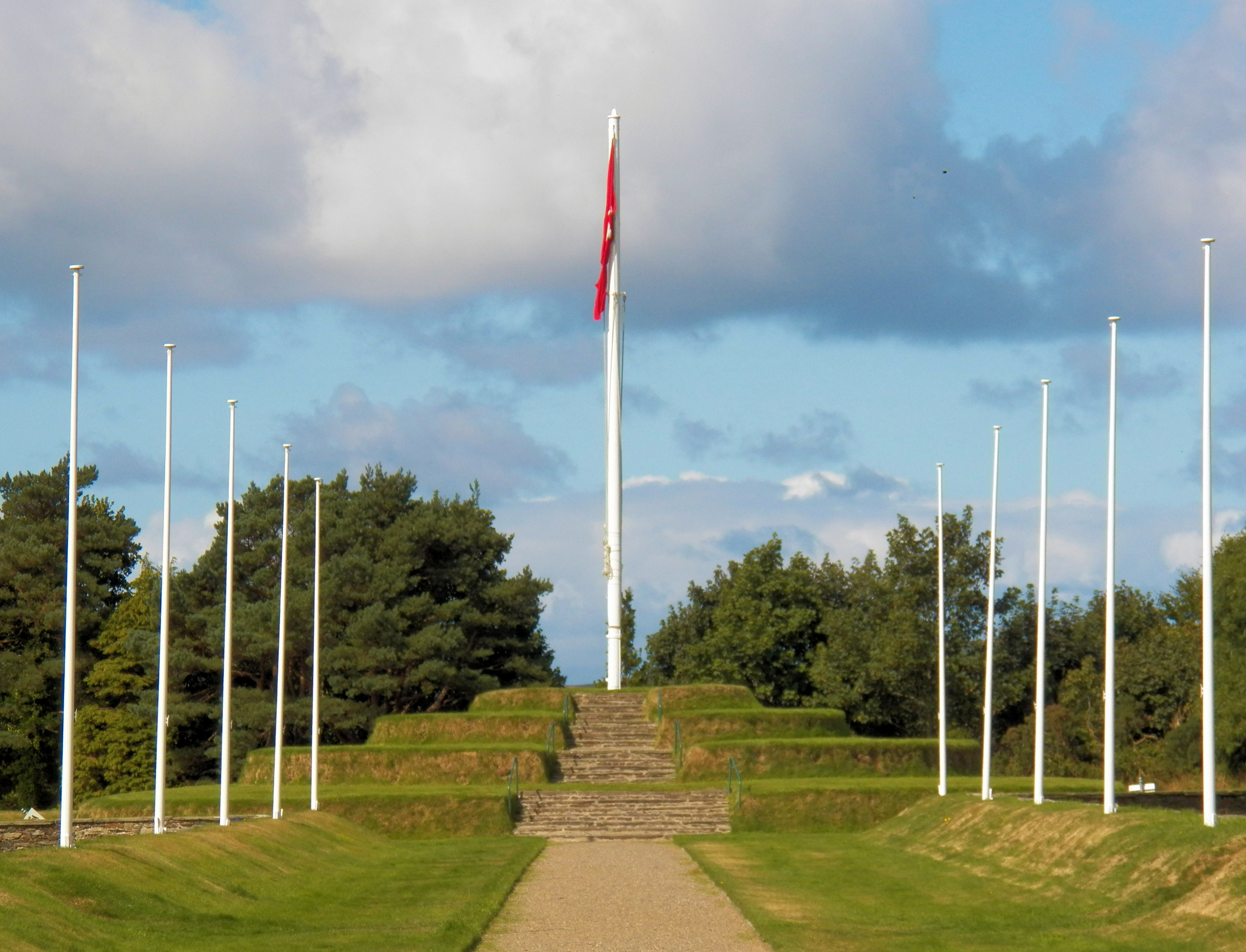
Tynwald Hill, Isle of Man

It has been conjectured that they were used in rituals connected with ancestor veneration; or that they follow astronomical alignments; or that they served as buffer zones between ceremonial and occupation landscapes. More recent studies have reassessed the original interpretation and argued that they were used for ceremonial competitions. Finds of arrowheads at the terminal ends suggest archery and hunting were important to the builders and that the length of the cursus may have reflected its use as a proving ground for young men involving a journey to adulthood. Anthropological parallels exist for this interpretation.

Contemporary internal features are rare and it has been traditionally thought that the cursuses were used as processional routes. They are often aligned on and respect the position of pre-existing long barrows and bank barrows and appear to ignore difficulties in terrain. The Dorset Cursus, the longest known example, crosses a river and three valleys along its course across Cranborne Chase and is close to the henge monuments at Knowlton.

The present-day Tynwald day ceremony on the Isle of Man involves the procession of parliament along a cursus-like structure, which is sometimes suggested as a related or continual folk tradition with the Neolithic cursus. Larger scale modern ceremonial analogs might include the National Mall in Washington, and The Mall, London.

== Identification by aerial photography ==
Numerous examples of cursuses are known and the discipline of aerial archaeology is the most effective method of identifying such large features following thousands of years of weathering and plough damage. Some cursuses have only been identified through a first sighting of cropmarks visible from aerial reconnaissance; for example, the cropmarks at Fetteresso were the first indication of a cursus at that location in Aberdeenshire, Scotland.

== Etymology ==
'Cursus' (plural 'cursūs' or 'cursuses') was a name given by early British archaeologists such as William Stukeley to the large parallel lengths of banks with external ditches which they thought were early Roman athletic courses, after the Latin word cursus, meaning "course".

== See also ==
- Avenue (archaeology)
- Cursus publicus
