= Stonehenge Landscape =

Estate owned by the National Trust of England

UNESCO World Heritage Site
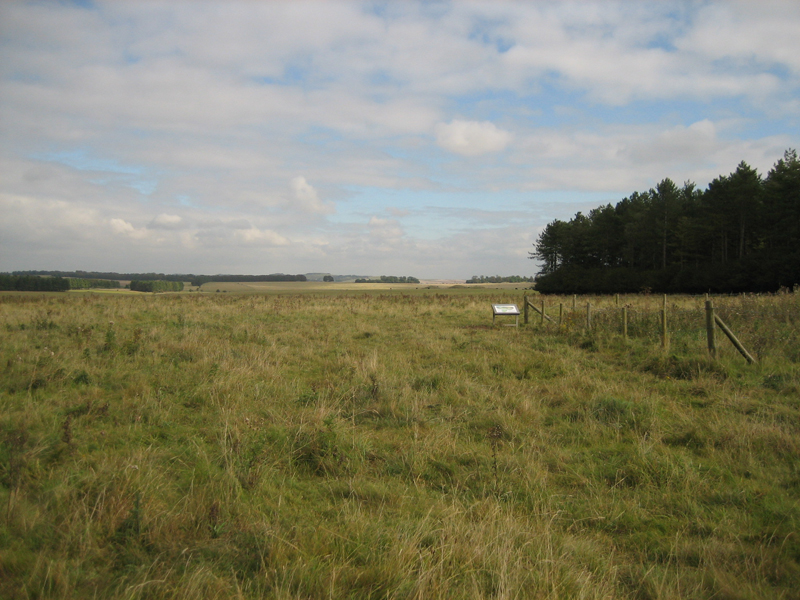
- The western end of the Stonehenge Cursus, part of the National Trust Stonehenge Landscape

- Location within Wiltshire Location within the United Kingdom
- Location: Wiltshire, England
- Part of: "Stonehenge and Associated Monuments" part of Stonehenge, Avebury and Associated Sites
- Criteria: Cultural: (i)(ii)(iii)
- Reference: 373bis-001
- Inscription: 1986 (10th Session)
- Extensions: 2008
- Website: https://www.nationaltrust.org.uk/stonehenge-landscape
- Coordinates: 51°10′44″N 1°49′41″W

The Stonehenge Landscape is a property of The National Trust, located on Salisbury Plain in Wiltshire, England. The estate (formerly known as Stonehenge Historic Landscape and before that as Stonehenge Down) covers 2,100 acres (850 ha) surrounding the Neolithic monument of Stonehenge, which is administered by English Heritage. Much of the land is designated open access by the Trust, including the fields immediately around Stonehenge and other fields that become available as part of the chalk grassland reversion project (see below). Stonehenge itself is in the care of English Heritage, having been given to the nation in 1918 by Cecil and Mary Chubb, who had bought it three years previously from the Antrobus family.

Much of the land surrounding the stones was acquired in 1927 after a public appeal was launched to prevent further development on the fields around the monument. The successfully purchased land was given to the National Trust for the benefit of the nation. Shortly afterwards such structures as cottages and the World War I-era Stonehenge Aerodrome were removed from the immediate vicinity of the stones.

There are two memorials to different fatal flying accidents in the area. Eustace Loraine and Staff Sergeant Wilson were killed in 1912 near the new Stonehenge Visitors' centre. Major Hewetson was killed in a flying accident near Fargo Wood in July 1913. Later the Trust acquired more land, principally after the purchase of an adjacent farm in the early 21st century.

The land owned by the Trust comprises almost one third of the Stonehenge World Heritage Site, and contains nearly 400 ancient monuments (most of them scheduled). These monuments include the enormous earthwork known as the Stonehenge Cursus, the Avenue, Woodhenge and Durrington Walls, as well as numerous burial mounds known as barrows. The estate also includes some of the Nile Clumps, large clumps of trees on arable farmland, said to represent ship positions at the Battle of the Nile. This is said to form a large memorial to Horatio Nelson, created by a local landowner after Nelson's death.

During the 1970s and 1980s, the estate was the scene of the Stonehenge Free Festival. Damage to monuments such as the Cursus barrows was one of the reasons that the festival was banned in 1985.

As part of the World Heritage Site Management Plan for Stonehenge, some 340 hectares of the land will revert to chalk grassland by 2011. The scheme (one of the largest reversion schemes of its kind in Europe) will turn over much of the estate to permanent pasture, and allow for increased open access around the area. At present some 112 hectares have reverted and, along with the existing grassland, are used as public open access as well as animal grazing.

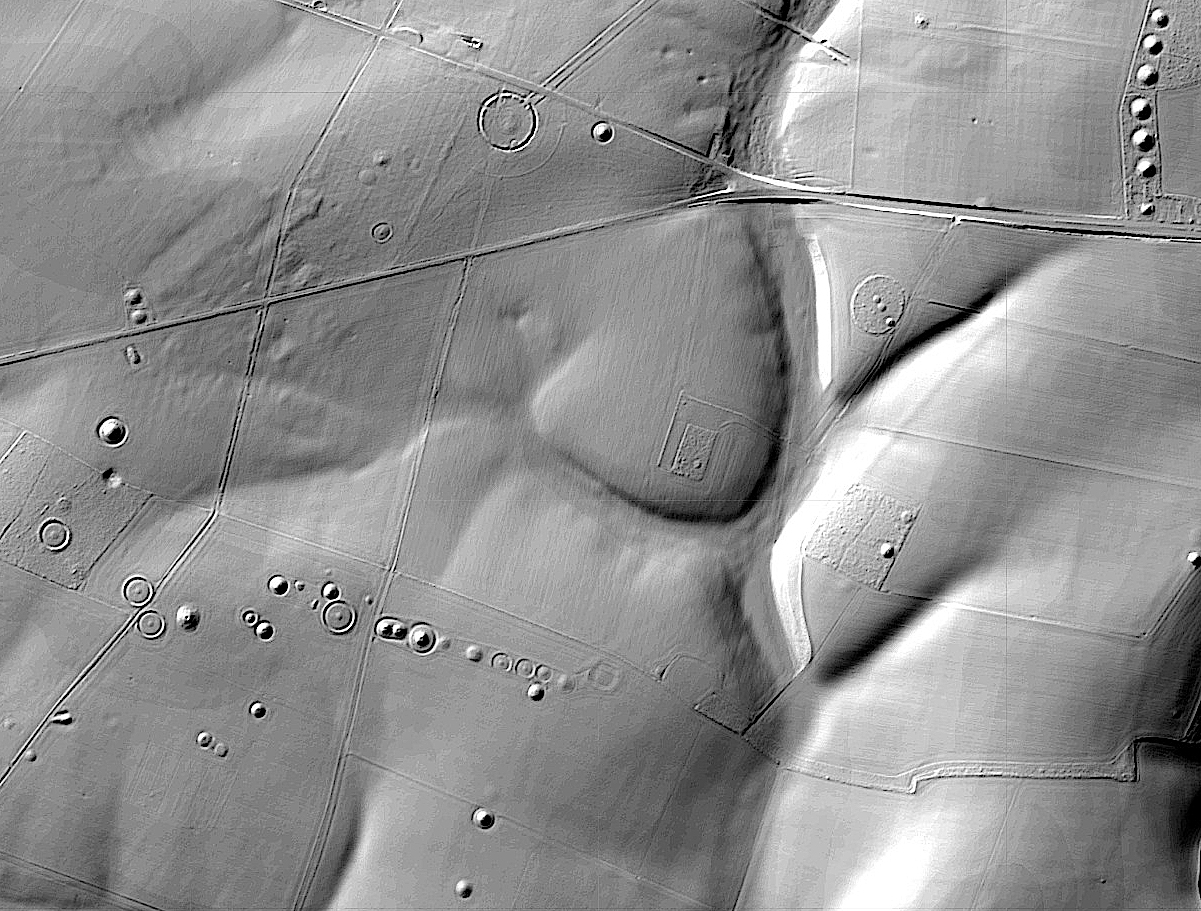
A lidar view of the landscape south of Stonehenge (top left of centre)

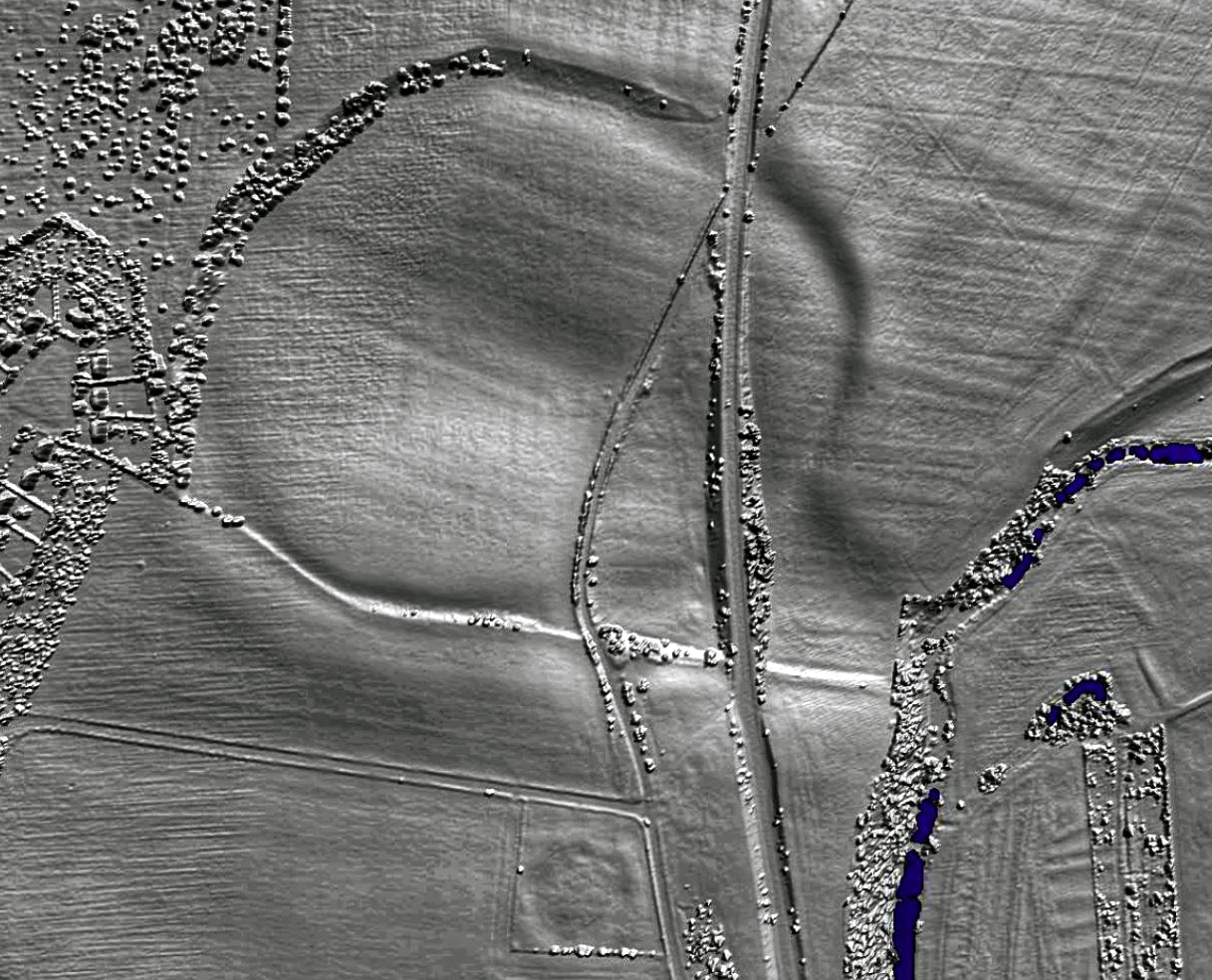
A lidar view of Durrington Walls and Woodhenge

== See also ==
- Archaeoastronomy and Stonehenge
- Excavations at Stonehenge
- Theories about Stonehenge
- Cultural depictions of Stonehenge
- Stonehenge road tunnel
- Stonehenge Riverside Project
