= Aerial archaeology =

Aerial archaeology is the study of archaeological sites from the air. It is a method of archaeological investigation that uses aerial photography, remote sensing, and other techniques to identify, record, and interpret archaeological features and sites. Aerial archaeology has been used to discover and map a wide range of archaeological sites, from prehistoric settlements and ancient roads to medieval castles and World War II battlefields.

Aerial archaeology involves interpretation and image analysis of photographic and other kinds of images in field research to understand archaeological features, sites, and landscapes. It enables exploration and examination of context and large land areas, on a scale unparalleled by other archaeological methods. The AARG (Aerial Archaeology Research Group) boasts that "more archaeological features have been found worldwide through aerial photography than by any other means of survey".

Aerial archaeological survey combines data collection and data analysis. The umbrella term "aerial images" includes traditional aerial photographs, satellite images, multispectral data (which captures image data within specific wavelength ranges across the electromagnetic spectrum) and hyperspectral data (similar to multispectral data, but more detailed).

A vast bank of aerial images exists, with parts freely available online or at specialist libraries. These are often vertical images taken for area surveys by aircraft or satellite (not necessarily for archaeological reasons). Each year a small number of aerial images are taken by archaeologists during prospective surveys.

== History ==
=== Late-19th and early-20th century observations ===
The origins of aerial photography, which led to the rise of aerial archaeology, began in the mid-19th century with early experiments in capturing landscapes from above. The French photographer Nadar (Gaspard-Félix Tournachon), who is credited with taking the first aerial photograph from a balloon in 1858 over the outskirts of Paris. In America, a man named James Wallace Black, in 1860, became the first person to successfully take aerial photographs from a hot air balloon over Boston. Around the same time, Thaddeus Lowe, a scientist and aeronaut, also used balloons for military reconnaissance during the American Civil War.

In the years leading up to the First World War, several early attempts were made to use aerial photography for archaeological purposes, though they often faced significant technical and practical challenges. One of the earliest figures involved in this effort was Sir Henry Wellcome, a British–American pharmaceutical entrepreneur and philanthropist. In the early 1900s, Wellcome financed several archaeological expeditions in Sudan, where he employed aerial photography using a box kite to document excavations in Jebel Moya, Sudan.

Nevertheless, while the products of these efforts proved the potential value of aerial photographs for archaeological research, these early attempts to obtain usable photographs fell short. Camera technology of the time was insufficient, let alone the erstwhile methods for getting cameras into the air.

=== World War I and the birth of aerial archaeology ===
The outbreak of World War I marked a critical turning point in the development of aerial archaeology. British and Belgian air forces pioneered the use of aerial photography for reconnaissance as early as 1914, marking the beginning of a systematic approach to aerial observations. Aerial photography advanced rapidly due to its essential role in military reconnaissance. Both the Allies and Central Powers relied heavily on aerial photographs to map enemy positions and monitor battlefield activity. It was during this time that aerial photography techniques improved dramatically, particularly in terms of camera technology, altitude, and photographic film quality. The use of specialized reconnaissance aircraft, which were equipped with advanced cameras, allowed for the collection of high-resolution images on a scale and precision previously unattainable.

Although aerial photography during the war was primarily a military tool, its application to archaeology was soon recognized. The thousands of aerial photographs captured over Europe revealed previously unknown archaeological features, such as crop marks, that were visible from the air but invisible from the ground. These images, primarily intended for military strategy, revealed unexpected archaeological features, especially in Europe. This discovery highlighted the potential of aerial photography not just for military purposes but also for archaeological discovery and documentation.

After the war, many of the techniques and technologies developed during the conflict were adopted by archaeologists. Figures like English archaeologist O.G.S. Crawford, who is widely considered the "father of aerial archaeology," were instrumental in applying wartime advances to peacetime archaeological research. Crawford recognized the potential of aerial photography for archaeological research and conducted extensive surveys of the English landscape from the air. He published numerous articles and books on the subject, laying the foundation for the development of aerial archaeology as a scientific discipline. Crawford's systematic use of aerial photography in the 1920s marked the beginning of modern aerial archaeology, building on the foundations laid by earlier pioneers and the technological leaps made during the war.

=== O.G.S. Crawford and the systematic use of aerial photography ===
In the 1920s, Osbert Guy Stanhope Crawford emerged as a key figure in the development of aerial archaeology. Crawford recognized the potential of aerial photography for systematically documenting archaeological sites. His work in Britain and the Middle East demonstrated that aerial surveys could reveal features such as crop marks and soil disturbances that were undetectable from ground level. His pioneering efforts helped establish aerial archaeology as a legitimate and essential method within the broader field of archaeological research.

Major G. W. G. Allen was an English engineer who, after learning of the work Crawford was doing, he was inspired to use his own airplane around Southern England, taking photographs of the landscape. His work in documenting prehistoric landscapes and Roman roads in England marked a significant advancement in the application of aerial methods for archaeological surveys.

=== Post-war expansion ===
==== Technological advances ====
Following the Second World War, advancements in aerial photography and imaging techniques significantly broadened the scope of aerial archaeology. The introduction of infrared photography and multispectral imaging enabled archaeologists to detect subtle variations in vegetation and soil, allowing for the identification of buried structures that would otherwise remain hidden. These technological innovations made it possible to conduct more detailed and accurate surveys, further enhancing the effectiveness of aerial archaeology.

==== Global expansion of aerial archaeology ====
In the post-war period, aerial archaeology expanded beyond Europe, becoming an invaluable tool for researchers working in regions with vast and difficult-to-access landscapes, such as the Americas, Africa, and Asia. In these areas, aerial surveys uncovered ancient civilizations and revealed the locations of significant archaeological sites, many of which had been previously unknown. The ability to survey large areas quickly and efficiently made aerial archaeology a critical tool for understanding diverse archaeological landscapes across the globe.

=== Modern aerial archaeology ===
==== Drones and UAVs ====
In recent years, the advent of drones, or unmanned aerial vehicles (UAVs), has revolutionized aerial archaeology. Drones offer greater flexibility and lower operational costs compared to traditional crewed aircraft. With the ability to capture high-resolution images and access areas that are otherwise difficult to reach, drones have become an essential tool for modern archaeological surveys. The increased use of drones has made aerial archaeology more accessible to a broader range of researchers and has led to more frequent and detailed studies of archaeological landscapes.

==== LiDAR and photogrammetry ====
Technological advancements such as LiDAR (Light Detection and Ranging) and photogrammetry have further enhanced aerial archaeology. LiDAR, in particular, is capable of penetrating dense vegetation to reveal features hidden beneath forest canopies, making it a valuable tool for studying heavily forested regions. Photogrammetry, which allows for the creation of precise 3D models of archaeological sites, has enabled researchers to document and analyze sites with increased speed and accuracy. Together, these technologies have expanded the potential of aerial archaeology, allowing for more detailed and comprehensive analyses of archaeological sites.

Notable people in the field of aerial archaeology include:

- O. G. S. Crawford (England): Pioneered the use of aerial photography for archaeological survey.
- Roger Agache (France): A leading figure in the development of aerial archaeology in France, known for his work on Gallo-Roman sites.
- Antoine Poidebard (Syria): Used aerial photography to study Roman limes in the Middle East.
- Dache McClain Reeves (United States): A pioneer in the use of aerial photography to study Native American archaeology in the United States.
- Henry Wellcome (Sudan)
- Lionel Rees (Jordan)
- Giacomo Boni (Italy)

== Applications ==
Aerial archaeology plays a crucial role in discovering new archaeological sites and mapping their extent. By providing a bird's-eye view, aerial images can reveal subtle features and patterns that are often invisible from the ground. This is particularly valuable in areas with:

- Dense vegetation: Aerial photography can penetrate tree canopies and reveal hidden earthworks, structures, and other features obscured by foliage.
- Large-scale features: Extensive archaeological landscapes, such as ancient field systems, roads, or settlements, are often best appreciated and understood from the air.
- Inaccessible terrain: Aerial reconnaissance allows archaeologists to survey remote or difficult-to-access areas, such as mountains, deserts, or wetlands, where ground surveys would be challenging.

=== Identifying and recording archaeological features ===
Aerial images provide a wealth of information for identifying and recording archaeological features. These include:

- Earthworks: Banks, ditches, mounds, and other earthworks often create subtle variations in topography that are readily visible in aerial photographs, particularly when illuminated by low-angle sunlight.
- Cropmarks and soil marks: Variations in plant growth or soil color can reveal the presence of buried features, such as walls, ditches, or pits.
- Stone structures: Walls, buildings, and other stone structures can often be identified by their shape, shadow, and texture in aerial images.
- Ancient land use: Traces of past human activities, such as field systems, roads, and canals, can often be detected in aerial photographs.

By carefully analyzing aerial images, archaeologists can identify, document, and interpret a wide range of archaeological features, providing valuable insights into past human activities and settlement patterns.

=== Creating site plans and maps ===
Aerial photographs provide the foundation for creating accurate and detailed site plans and maps. This involves:

- Georeferencing: Aligning aerial images with real-world coordinates, ensuring accurate spatial referencing.
- Orthorectification: Correcting for geometric distortions in aerial images, creating a planimetrically accurate representation of the ground.
- Mapping features: Tracing the outlines of archaeological features identified in the imagery, creating a digital record of the site.
- Creating topographic maps: Using aerial photographs and elevation data to generate contour maps that illustrate the shape and relief of the terrain.

These site plans and maps are essential for documenting archaeological sites, planning excavations, and managing cultural heritage resources. They provide a valuable record of the site's extent, features, and spatial context, aiding in interpretation and future research.

== Techniques and technologies ==
=== Aerial photography ===
Photography is the most common method used in aerial archaeology. Archaeologists use specialized cameras and lenses to capture high-resolution images of the ground from aircraft or drones.

==== Oblique vs. vertical photography ====
Aerial photographs can be captured from different angles, each offering distinct advantages for archaeological investigation:

- Oblique photography: Taken at an angle, oblique photographs provide a more familiar perspective, similar to what the human eye would see. This allows for easier recognition of features and provides a sense of depth and context. Oblique images are particularly useful for visualizing the relationship between archaeological sites and their surrounding landscape.
- Vertical photography: Captured directly overhead, vertical photographs offer a planimetric view, minimizing distortion and enabling accurate measurements and mapping. These images are ideal for creating precise site plans, documenting the extent of archaeological features, and monitoring changes over time.

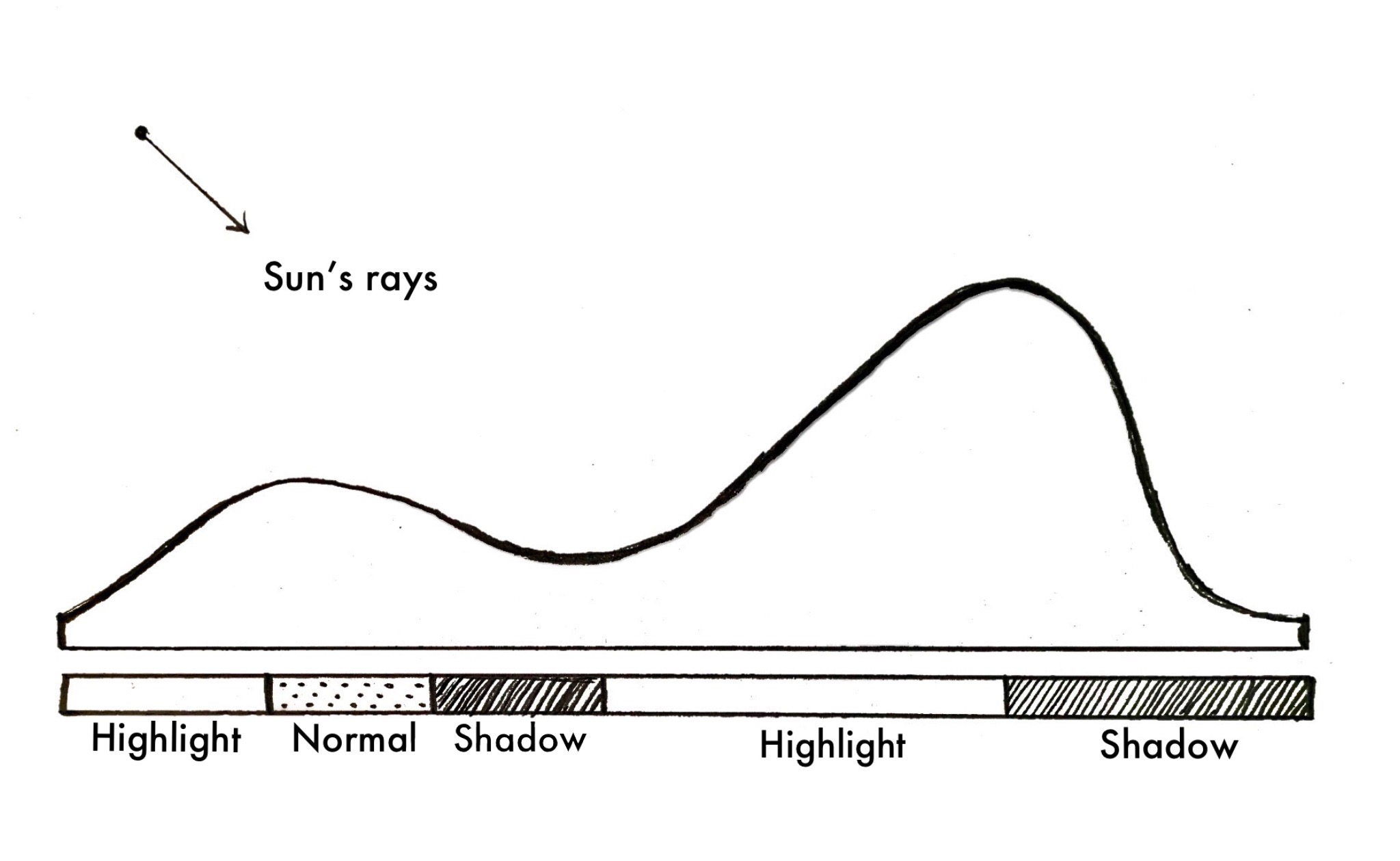
Diagram showing shadows and highlights from the sun, as would be seen from above, falling on a mild bank and a steep bank

The choice between oblique and vertical photography depends on the specific research questions and the characteristics of the site being investigated. Often, archaeologists use a combination of both techniques to gain a comprehensive understanding of the archaeological record.

=== Identifying archaeological features in aerial images ===
Certain archaeological features are more visible from the air than on the ground due to their nature. A key concept behind interpretation in aerial archaeology is that formation processes affect site features differently after abandonment. For a site to be detected by a remote sensing method, one would expect alterations to the soil or subsoil e.g. ditches, pits, banks, mounds, walls etc. which often are visible in relief.

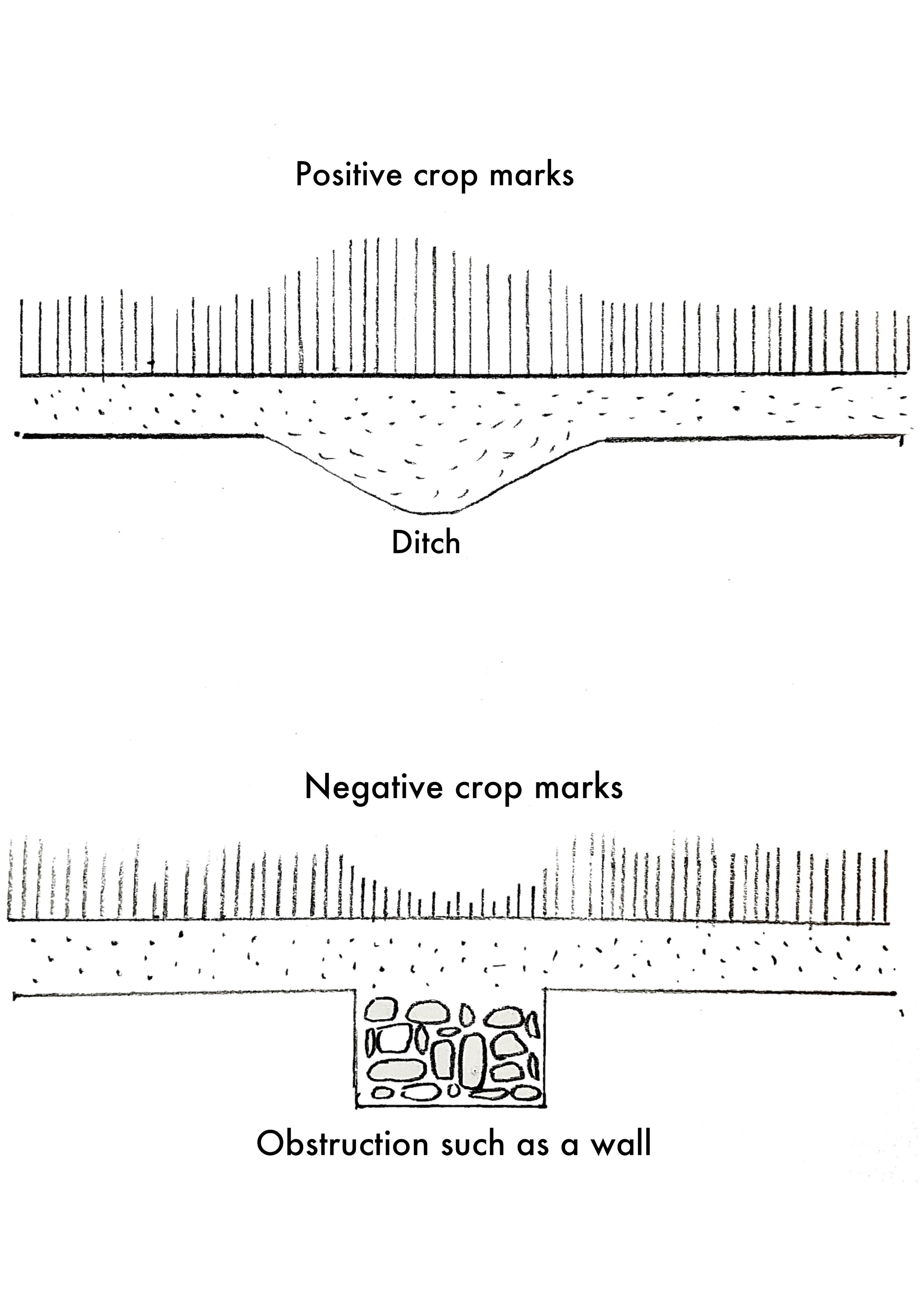
Effects of sub-soil features on the growth of crops. This allows for diagnosis of sub-soil features by visual inspection of crops using aerial images.

Tiny differences in ground conditions caused by buried features can be emphasized by a number of factors and viewed from the air:

- Shadow marks: slight differences in ground levels will cast shadows when the sun is low and are best from above.
- Cropmarks: buried ditches will hold more water and buried walls will hold less water than undisturbed ground, which causes crops to grow taller or shorter, and therefore define buried features, e.g. as tonal or color differences.
- Soil marks: slight differences in soil color between natural deposits and archaeological ones can often be visible in ploughed fields.
- Frost marks: frost can also appear in winter on ploughed fields where water has naturally accumulated along the lines of buried features.
- Water pooling: differences in levels and buried features will also affect the way surface water behaves across a site, producing striking effects after heavy rain.

For a three-dimensional effect, an overlapping pair of vertical photographs, taken from slightly offset positions, can be viewed stereoscopically.

=== Remote sensing ===
Beyond traditional aerial photography, archaeologists use a range of remote sensing techniques to investigate sites without physical excavation. These methods involve collecting data from a distance using specialized sensors that detect and record different forms of electromagnetic radiation. This information can reveal subsurface features, variations in vegetation, and other archaeological clues hidden from the naked eye. Digital data, for example, ALS, can be used effectively in "heavily automated workflows," (a process that uses rule-based logic to launch tasks that run without human intervention), e.g. a six-year project using supervised automated classification to survey 35,000 km^{2} (14,000 sq mi) of Baden-Wurttemberg in Germany, identified as many as 600,000 possible sites.

The NASA LANDSAT series (satellite observations) are often used in aerial archaeology. Renfrew and Bahn describes the techniques used as scanners that "record the intensity of reflected light and the infrared radiation from the earth surface and convert these electronically into photographic images." LANDSAT images have helped in identifying large-scale features, such as an ancient riverbed running from the Saudi Arabian desert to Kuwait.

SLAR (sideways looking airborne radar) is a remote sensing technique that records pulses of electromagnetic radiation from an aircraft. Richard Adams used SLAR to identify a matrix of possible Mayan water irrigation systems underneath the dense rainforest from a NASA aircraft.

SAR (synthetic aperture radar) involves radar images that are processed to create high-resolution data. This technique stands out, as weather conditions and nightfall do not affect its results. Renfrew and Bahn describe it as a "rapid non-destructive alternative to surface survey that does not involve the collection of artifacts." It can be faster and less time-consuming than surface survey.

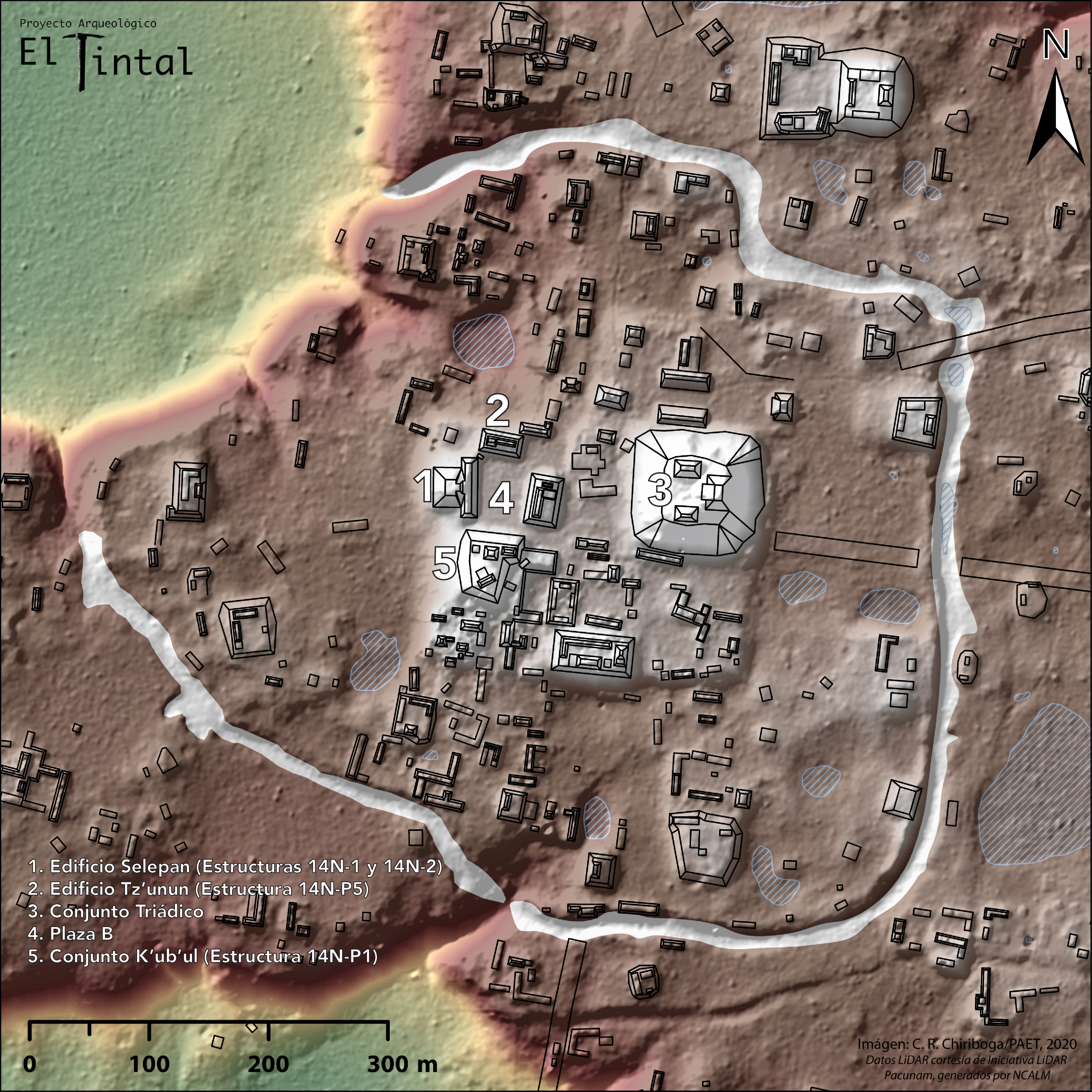
Lynchet system near Bishopstone in Wiltshire. LiDAR technology used to map topography.

=== LiDAR ===
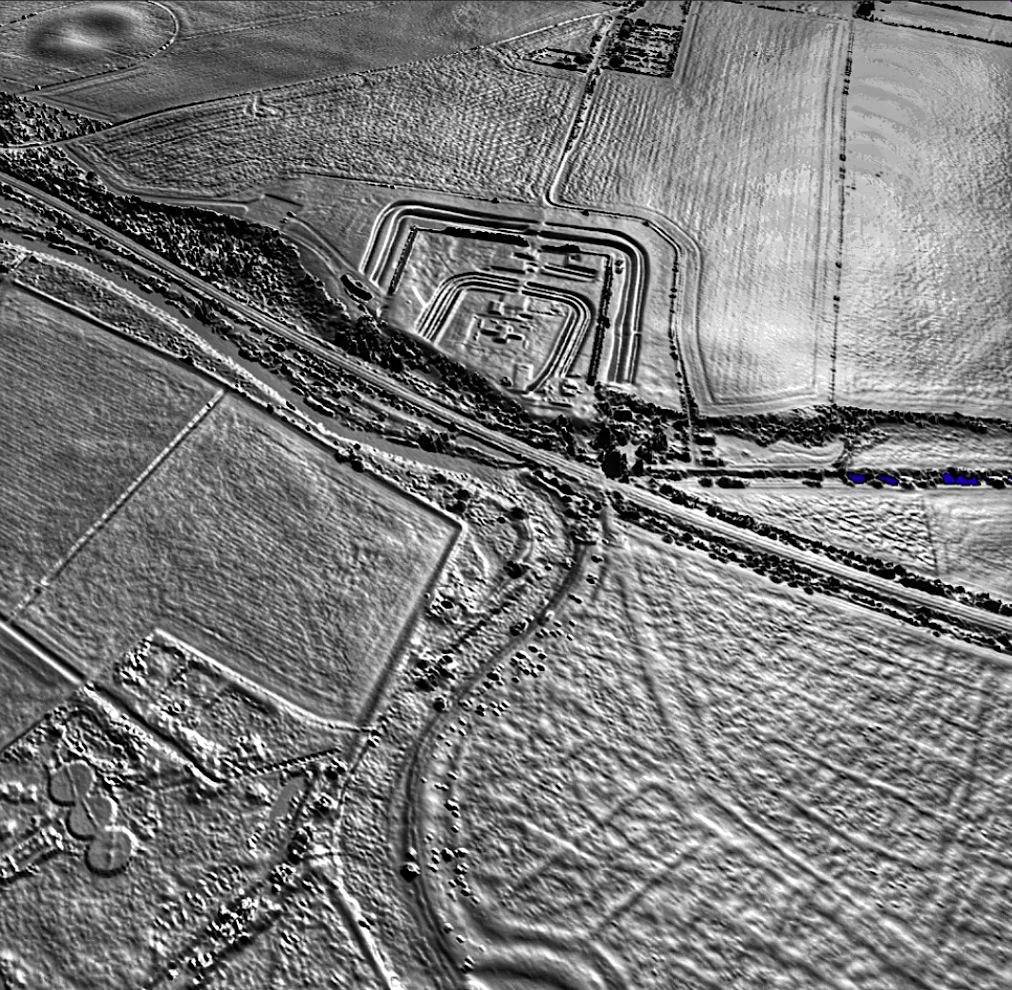
A lidar view of Richborough Roman fort and amphitheatre at Rutupiae in Kent and part of Richborough port (HER 1916–1945)

Lidar (light detection and ranging) aka ALS (airborne laser scanning) uses laser scanner pulses to measure the distance to the ground and other objects. By emitting thousands of pulses per second and recording the time it takes for them to return to the sensor, LiDAR creates highly accurate 3D models of the Earth's surface. In archaeology, LiDAR is invaluable for:

- Mapping terrain: LiDAR can penetrate dense vegetation, revealing subtle variations in topography that may indicate the presence of buried features like walls, ditches, or mounds.
- Creating digital elevation models (DEMs): These models provide detailed representations of the ground surface, allowing archaeologists to identify archaeological features that are not readily apparent on the ground.
- Visualizing landscapes: LiDAR data can be used to create stunning visualizations of archaeological landscapes, aiding in the interpretation of site layout and land use patterns.

=== Satellite imagery ===
In places yet to be documented (or where maps are considered confidential), satellite imagery is vital to providing base maps for excavation. Satellite imagery offers a broad perspective, covering vast areas and providing valuable data for regional studies and landscape archaeology. Different types of satellites capture various wavelengths of light, providing information about:

- Vegetation patterns: Analyzing variations in vegetation health and density can reveal traces of ancient structures or land use practices.
- Soil composition: Satellite imagery can help identify different soil types, which can be associated with past human activities.
- Land use changes: Monitoring changes in land use over time can provide insights into settlement patterns and environmental impacts.

One of the useful resources for accessing satellite imagery is Google Earth. This platform includes a range of different satellite and aerial images, such as the NASA LANDSAT series, Ikonos, QuickBird, GeoEye alongside more.

The Cold War CORONA satellite photographs have been used extensively for base maps and provisional interpretation. In contrast to other imagery, CORONA uses two images of the same feature to create a stereoscopic view, which can allow for more accurate examination and interpretation in 3D.

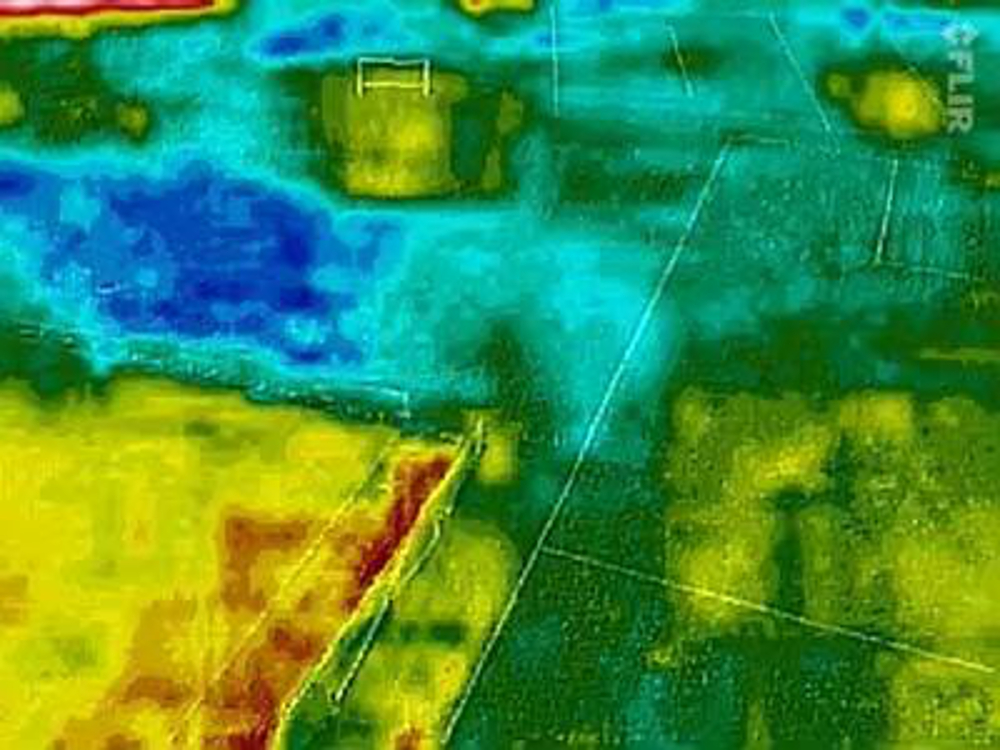
Kite aerial thermogram revealing features on/under a grassed playing field. Visualisation is through differential evapotranspiration, as the image was produced following a light shower of rain a few hours earlier.

=== Thermal imaging ===
Thermal imaging captures infrared radiation emitted by objects, revealing differences in temperature and emissivity. In archaeology, this can be used to:

- Detect buried structures: Walls, foundations, and other subsurface features may retain heat differently (thermal inertia) than the surrounding soil, creating thermal anomalies visible in thermal images.
- Identify moisture patterns: Variations in soil moisture and plant transpiration (evapotranspiration) can affect temperature, revealing potential archaeological features.
- Monitor site conditions: Thermal imaging can help assess the condition of archaeological sites and identify areas at risk of damage.

ASTER (advanced spaceborne thermal emission and reflection radiometer) is used to create maps of "land surface temperature, reflectance, and elevation." It is attached to the side of satellite Terra and can be used to create digital elevation models.

=== Multispectral and hyperspectral imaging ===
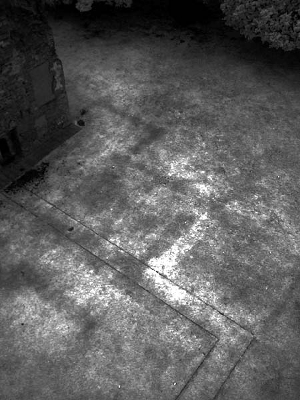
Near infrared light is reflected by healthy plants. When plants are stressed, as here with grass above wall foundations, the light is absorbed. This can take place before any visible changes are apparent like parching.

These advanced imaging techniques capture data across a wide range of the electromagnetic spectrum, going beyond the visible light captured by traditional cameras.

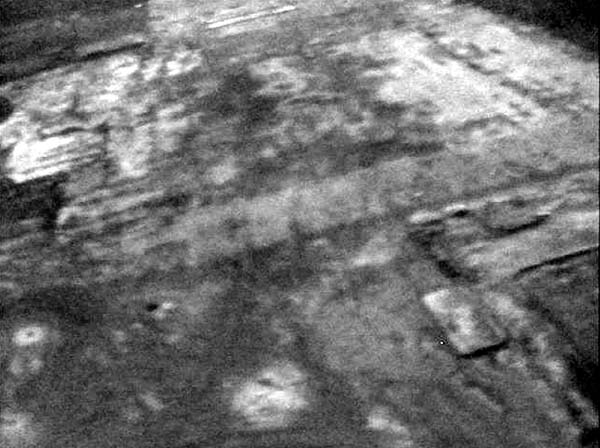
An oblique near ultraviolet aerial view of a vegetation-free, former brickworks site at Armadale in West Lothian.

- Multispectral imaging: Records data in a select number of broader wavelength bands, often including infrared and ultraviolet light. This can help differentiate between subtle variations in vegetation, soil, and building materials, aiding in the identification of archaeological features.
- Hyperspectral imaging: Acquires data in hundreds of very narrow, contiguous spectral bands, providing a detailed spectral signature for each pixel in the image. This allows for precise identification of materials based on their unique spectral properties, which can be used to map different types of vegetation, identify buried features, and even analyze the composition of archaeological materials.

=== Data processing and interpretation ===
For data analysis, aerial images must be analyzed and interpreted using specialized skill-sets. This includes an understanding of formation processes as well as contemporary history and landscape history. Often aerial archaeology will be carried out using computer programmed (such as GIS) aiding interpretation. The raw data collected through aerial photography and remote sensing requires careful processing and interpretation to extract meaningful archaeological information. This involves:

- Georeferencing: Aligning images with real-world coordinates, ensuring accurate spatial referencing.
- Orthorectification: Correcting for geometric distortions in aerial images, creating a planimetrically accurate representation of the ground.
- Image enhancement: Applying various techniques to improve image clarity, highlight subtle features, and remove noise.
- Feature extraction: Identifying and delineating archaeological features from the imagery, often aided by visual interpretation and image analysis software.
- Spatial analysis: Using GIS software to analyze the spatial relationships between archaeological features and their surrounding landscape.

=== Photogrammetry and 3D modeling ===
Photogrammetry is a technique for creating 3D models from overlapping photographs. By analyzing the different perspectives captured in multiple images, specialized software can reconstruct the geometry of the scene. In archaeology, photogrammetry is used to:

- Create detailed 3D models of sites and artifacts: These models can be used for documentation, analysis, and virtual exploration.
- Generate accurate measurements and plans: Precise dimensions and spatial relationships can be extracted from the 3D models.
- Monitor site changes: Comparing models created at different times can reveal subtle changes in site condition, aiding in conservation efforts.

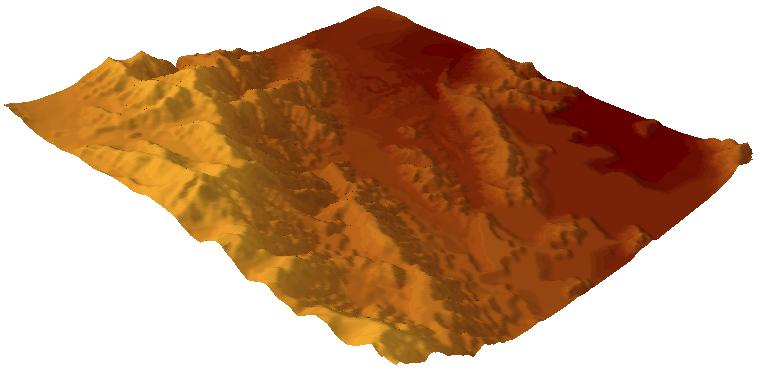
Digital elevation model showing intricacies of topography

=== GIS applications ===
Geographic Information Systems (GIS) are essential tools in modern archaeology, providing a powerful platform for managing, analyzing, and visualizing spatial data. In aerial archaeology, GIS plays a crucial role in:

- Data integration: GIS allows archaeologists to combine data from various sources, such as aerial photographs, satellite imagery, LiDAR, and ground surveys, into a single georeferenced database. This facilitates a holistic understanding of the site and its surrounding landscape.
- Spatial analysis: GIS enables sophisticated spatial analysis, allowing archaeologists to investigate patterns and relationships within the data. This includes analyzing site distribution, identifying clusters of features, and modeling the relationship between sites and environmental factors.
- Predictive modeling: By analyzing known site locations and environmental variables, GIS can be used to predict the likelihood of finding undiscovered archaeological sites in a given area. This helps prioritize survey efforts and increases the efficiency of archaeological investigations.
- Visualization and interpretation: GIS provides tools for creating maps, 3D visualizations, and interactive displays of archaeological data. This aids in interpreting the spatial context of sites, communicating findings to stakeholders, and engaging the public with archaeological research.

=== Image enhancement and analysis techniques ===
Raw aerial images often require enhancement to improve their clarity and highlight archaeological features. Various digital image processing techniques are employed, including:

- Contrast stretching: Increases the difference between light and dark tones in an image, making subtle features more apparent.
- Spatial filtering: Reduces noise and enhances edges, improving the visibility of linear features like walls or roads.
- Band ratioing: Combines data from different spectral bands to highlight specific features or materials, such as vegetation or soil types.
- Principal component analysis (PCA): Reduces data redundancy and highlights subtle variations in multispectral or hyperspectral images.
- Classification: Assigns pixels to different categories based on their spectral properties, helping to identify and map different types of land cover or archaeological features.

These image enhancement and analysis techniques are crucial for extracting meaningful information from aerial imagery, allowing archaeologists to identify subtle archaeological features and interpret their significance within the broader landscape.

== Case studies ==
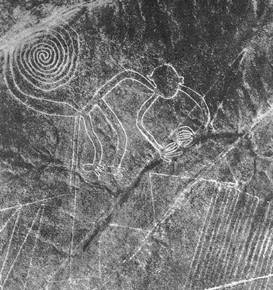
Aerial archaeological photograph of the "Nazca monkey" in Peru

- Nazca Lines, Peru: Aerial photography played a crucial role in documenting and understanding the enigmatic Nazca Lines, giant geoglyphs etched into the desert.
- Angkor Wat, Cambodia: Aerial laser scanning (LiDAR) has been used to map the extensive temple complex of Angkor Wat and its surrounding landscape, revealing previously unknown features.
- Caracol, Belize: LiDAR surveys have helped to map the ancient Maya city of Caracol, revealing its size and complexity.
- Roman Limes in the Middle East: Antoine Poidebard's pioneering work using aerial photography to document the Roman frontier fortifications.

=== Caracol, Mayan City ===
Aerial archaeology, specifically Lidar, was used to study the site, a Mayan city in Belize, dated to 550–900 AD. Archaeologists Arlen and Diane Chase, from the University of Central Florida, worked for 25 years in the dense tropical rainforest, managing to map 23 km^{2} (8.9 sq mi) of settlement. At the end of the dry season of 2009, they embarked on four continuous days of LiDAR flying, followed by three weeks of analysis by remote sensing experts. This allowed them to surpass the results of the prior 25 years, revealing over 177 km^{2} (68 sq mi) of city—a far larger area than expected. Furthermore, the landscape was modelled in 3D, leading to the discovery of possible new sites such as "ruins, agricultural terraces and stone causeways" (to be investigated further for a greater understanding). We can thus see the impressive effect aerial methods can have on streamlining archaeological survey, and pushing the limits of what is possible.

=== Homs, Syria ===
Homs, Syria provides an example of how different types of satellite imagery can be used in combination. The site is based in an area notorious for its difficulties surrounding archaeological survey, as the diversity of terrain makes the detection of archaeological sites difficult. As a result, Homs is a perfect candidate for aerial reconnaissance. Modern agriculture often obscures remains through practices such as deep ploughing (which removes many levees and low-lying sites from the archaeological record). Furthermore, vegetation of different types/densities frequently disguises sites, impeding site visibility.

The Homs projects combined the usage of CORONA, LANDSAT, Ikonos, and QuickBird imagery to observe "long-term human and environmental interactions" and, more broadly, to assess the landscape, over an area of 630 square kilometres that had no prior database of remains or aerial photography. Through fieldwork, the different applications and abilities of these satellite imagery techniques were revealed, highlighting the importance of using multiple methods of archaeological investigation together.

The LANDSAT imagery fell short when used for site detection and mapping, due to its lower resolution compared to Quickbird and IKONOS, but was most successful at characterizing the environment and visualizing rates of change.

CORONA imagery successfully detected single-period sites, which could not be detected by IKONOS. Furthermore, CORONA imagery assisted in exposing ancient field systems, and crop marks within fields, revealing early watercourses.

In this instance, visual detection and interpretation of satellite imagery proved more useful than processing LANDSAT imagery.

Through interpretation archaeological sites were identified as tells with low-relief soil markings, "with remains ranging from small walls less than 1 m wide to large multi period settlements." The projects as a whole demonstrated how valuable aerial archaeology is to archaeological survey, especially across terrains where other techniques are not possible.

== See also ==
- Archaeological field survey
- Cropmark
- Markus Casey
- Shadow marks
