= Cursus (classical) =

The Latin word 'cursus' can be generally translated into English as 'course'. The word derives from currere, to run. It may be applied, for example, to a course of study, of medical treatment, or to a race-course. A well known instance is the cursus honorum - a ladder of political offices.

== Roman race-course ==
At its simplest, the Roman race-course took the form of two posts; each called a discrimen or a meta, round which the runners, whether on foot, on horses or in chariots, raced. The normal arrangement was more formalised as two straights, separated by a spina but very close to each other and with a very tight turn at each turning point. It was the similarity in appearance of this Roman cursus to the Neolithic archaeological feature which led 18th century antiquarians to use the same name for the latter.

This combination of straight and tight turn combined the thrills of speed on the straights with those of danger as collisions and falls were likely on the turns.

The distinction between a cursus and a circus in connection with racing is not wholly clear. Compare the description above with that of the Circus Maximus.
