= Soil mark =

Visible differences in soil as a result of buried archaeological features

Soil marks are differences in soil colour as a result of underlying archaeological features. They can be seen when a ploughed-out earthwork has left hard dry material of a former bank and damper wetter material from a former ditch. They can also occur when a feature has cut through the top soil to reveal underlying chalk. Soil marks typically become visible in ploughed or harrowed fields, usually where there are restricted periods before the crops grow.

== Appearance ==
The most obvious and occurring trace of soil marks is a difference in color relative to the rest of soil. Depending on the local geology, the soil marks can show up as dark against a light background or vice versa. The color of the soil is very important in determining whether or not organic or burnt deposits happened over the soil, producing a black or red colored soil. This allows archaeologists to understand the purpose of the artefacts found in the vicinity of the soil mark and can indicate whether or not fire was used.

== Occurrence ==
Archaeology that involves plough-damaged field systems, burial mounds, Roman villas or former sites usually produce soil marks. The soil marks gives the archaeologists an idea of where the structures were built or where the soil was damaged and for what reason. For instance, indicating a dried-up river channel (known as a palaeochannel), which may subsequently reveal rich waterlogged archaeological deposits in its lower layers, or an area of slightly higher ground above winter flood level on an alluvial floodplain, which may be very hard to detect from the ground but which has attracted settlement for thousands of years.

== See also ==
- Crop mark
