= Cropmark =

Means through which sub-surface features can be visible from the air

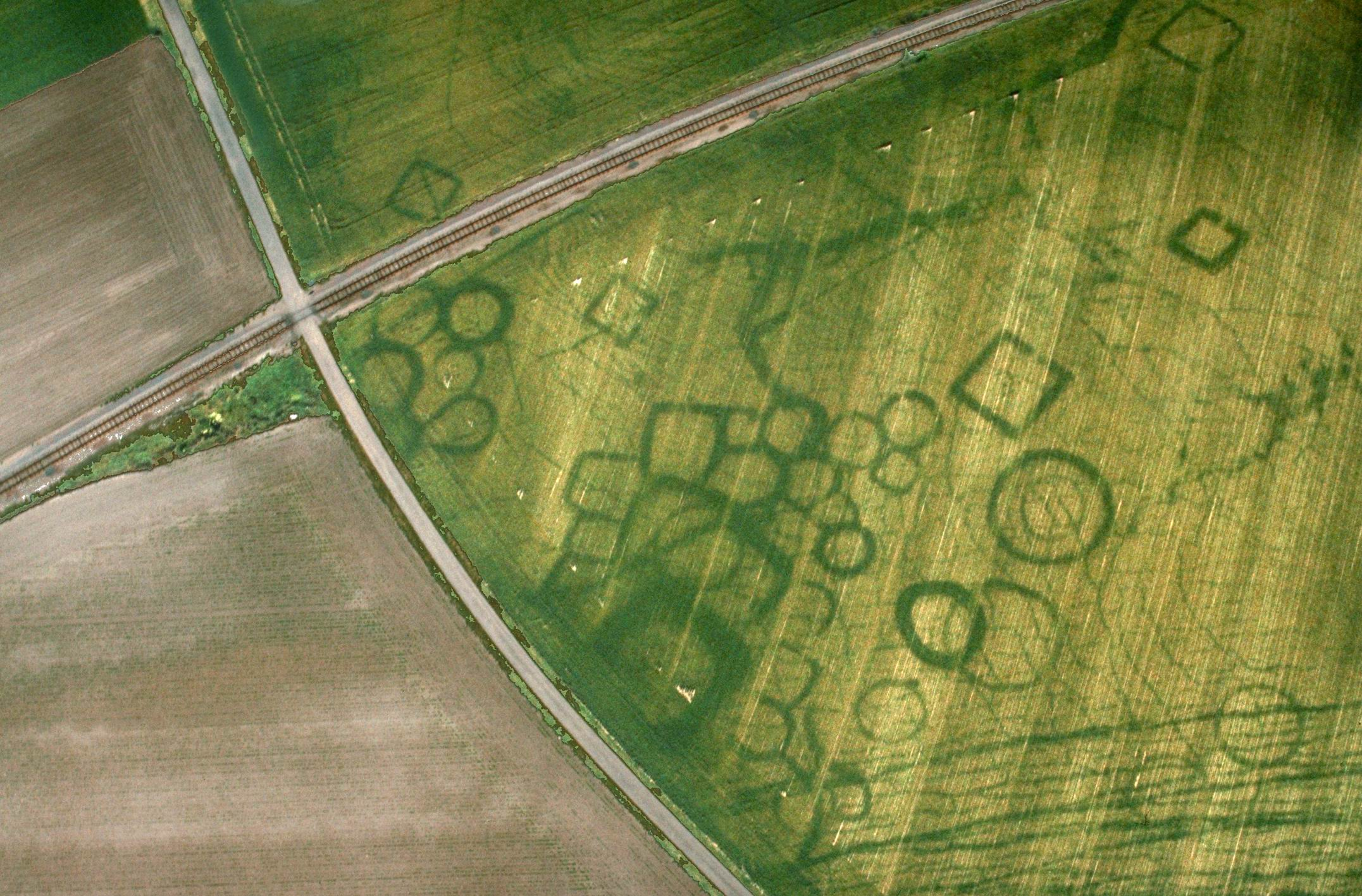
Cropmarks at a protohistoric site at Grézac, France

Cropmarks or crop marks are a means through which sub-surface archaeological, natural and recent features may be visible from the air or a vantage point on higher ground or a temporary platform. Such marks, along with parch marks, soil marks and frost marks, can reveal buried man-made structures that are not visible from the ground.

== Description ==
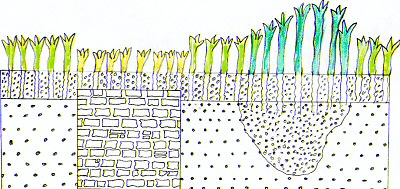
Sketched diagram of a negative cropmark above a wall and a positive cropmark above a ditch

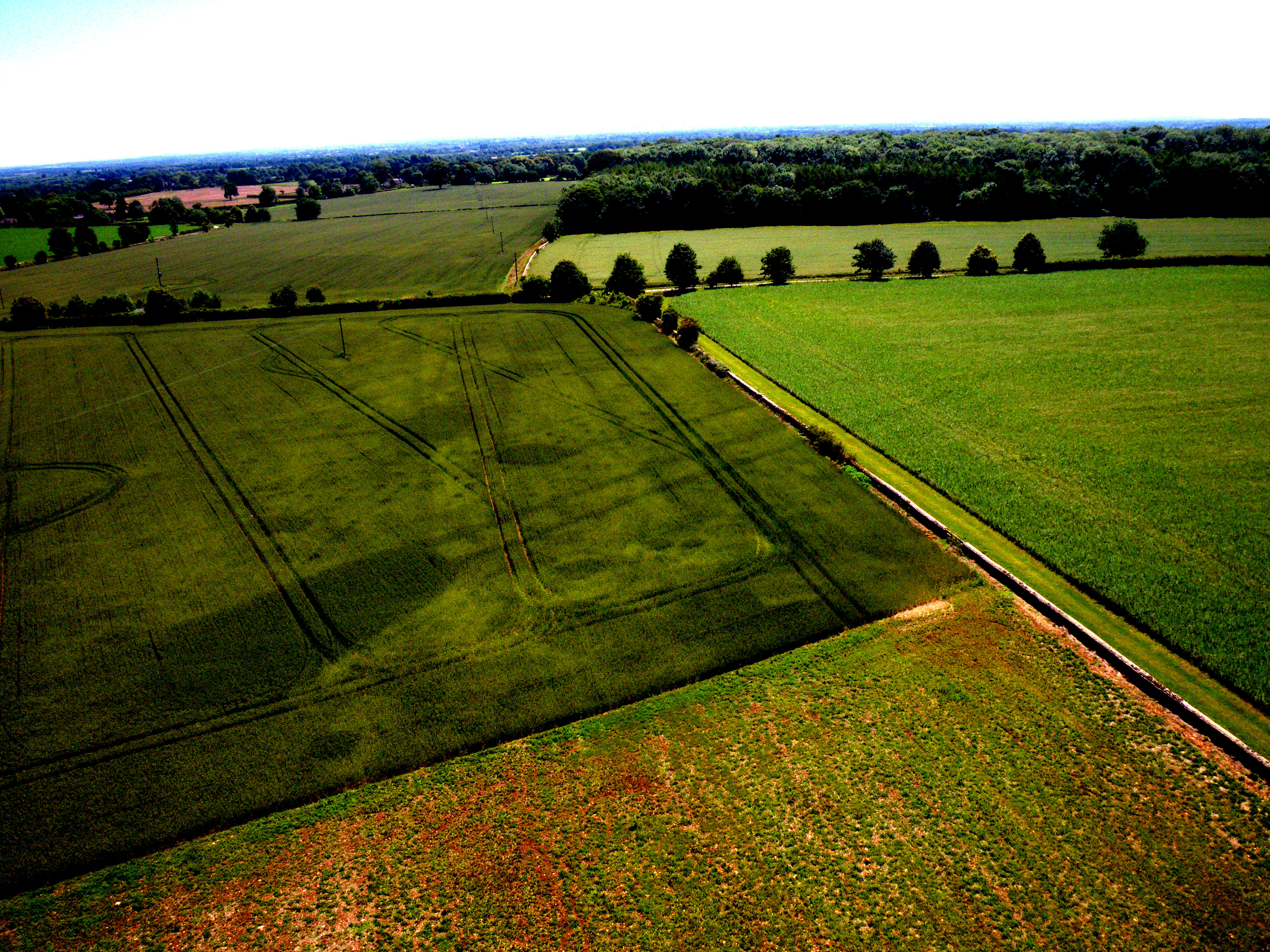
Crop marks in Gloucestershire. Cereal crop left, beans right. The relative intensity in the crops was reversed in the near infrared.

Crop marks are due to the principle of differential growth. Soil conditions are a key factor influencing vegetation growth. For instance, a buried stone wall can impact crop development above it by redirecting water away from the area and displacing the more fertile soil needed for healthy plant growth. Conversely, a buried ditch, with a fill containing more organic matter than the natural earth, provides much more conducive conditions, and water will naturally collect there, nourishing the plants growing above.

The differences in conditions will cause some plants to grow more strongly and therefore taller, and others less strongly and therefore shorter. Some species will also react through differential ripening of their fruits or their overall colour.

Particularly effective crops that exhibit differential growth include cereal crops, peas, and potatoes.

Differential growth will naturally follow any features buried below. Although the growth differences may appear small close up, from the air, the pattern they make is more visible, as the small changes can be seen as marked differences in tone or colour in the context of the normally growing surrounding vegetation. When the sun is low to the horizon, shadows cast by the taller crops can also become visible.

By their nature, crop marks are visible only seasonally and may not be visible at all except in exceptionally wet or dry years. Droughts can be especially useful to cropmark hunters, as the differential growth can become apparent in normally hardy species such as grass. The drought of 2010 produced particularly good conditions for observing crop marks in the UK. Pre-parching stress in crops and grass, and other factors that may affect plant health, can be captured in near infra-red photography.

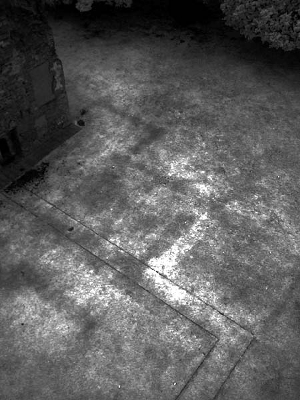
Near infra-red kite aerial photo at Rufford Abbey, Nottinghamshire, UK

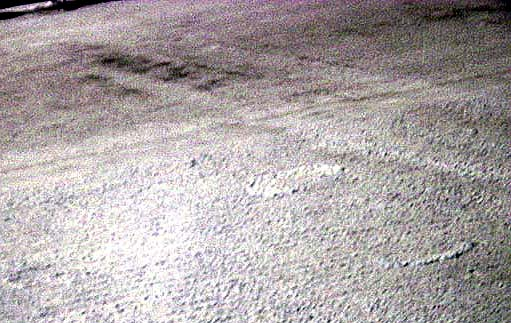
Roman Road – The Via Julia, Clifton Down, Bristol

An alternative approach is thermal imaging, where differential water loss (which is dependent on the availability of water at the roots) can create temperature differences, which result in thermal crop marks that are potentially visible at any time during crop growth. Thermal imaging can also reveal archaeological residues as a result of thermal inertia (storage heater effect) or differential evaporation. The interaction of the processes involved can be complex, and the prediction of optimal imaging time, for a given site, is further complicated by environmental conditions including temperature variation and relative humidity.

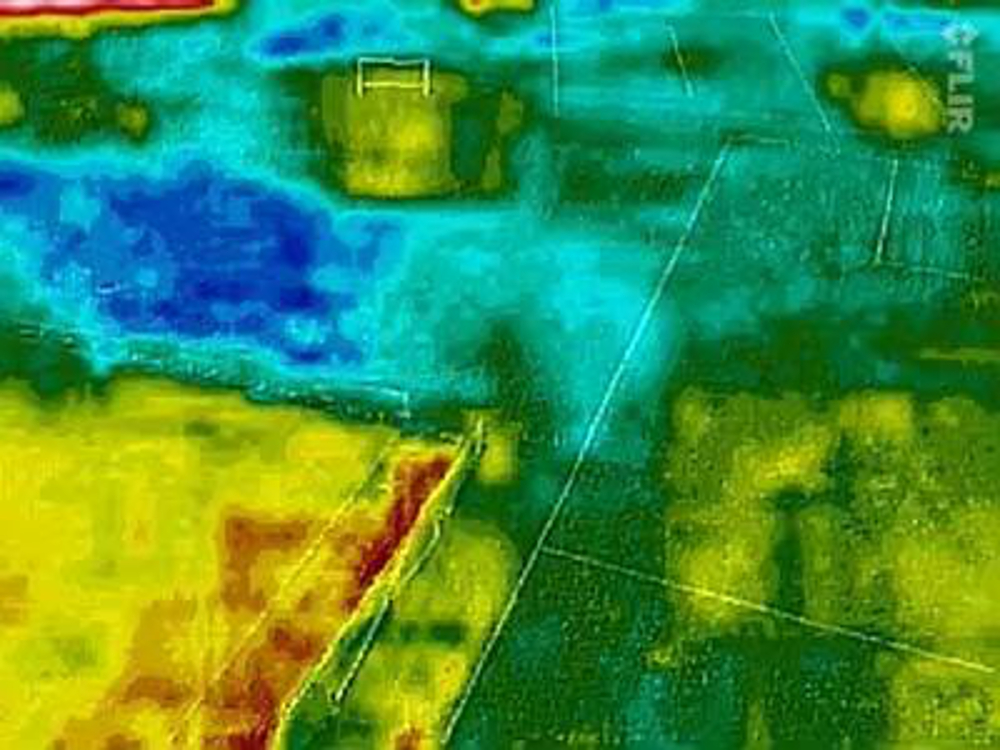
Kite aerial thermogram of Statford Court Playingfields, Stroud, Gloucestershire

Thermal inertia and differential transpiration/evaporation are involved.

The usefulness of cropmarks to archaeologists has largely been a fruit of inspection from aircraft, but the possibility was suggested by Rev. Gilbert White in The Natural History of Selborne (1789), in a note appended to his Letter VI, to Thomas Pennant, concerning local people's success in searching for bog oak for house construction, by discovering these trees "by the hoar frost, which lay longer over the space where they were concealed, than on the surrounding morass." To White, it suggested the query "might not such observations be reduced to domestic use, by promoting the discovery of old obliterated drains and wells about houses; and in Roman stations and camps lead to the finding of pavements, baths and graves, and other hidden relics of curious antiquity?"

== Examples ==
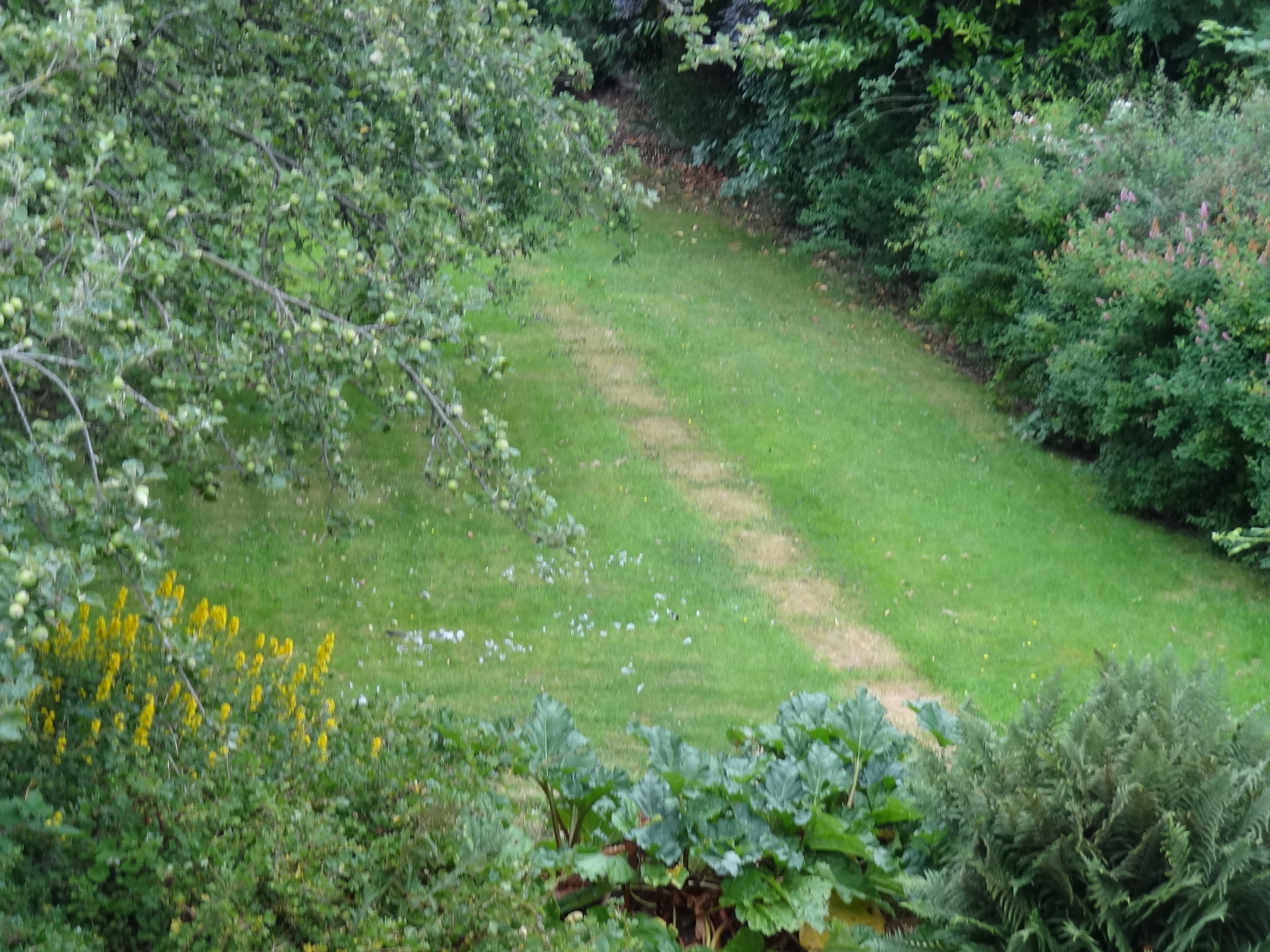
After a long, hot dry period, cropmark on a lawn from a line of flagstones overgrown and buried by grass

Examples of archaeological sites where cropmarks have been observed are Balbridie and Fetteresso in Scotland.

In 2009, investigation of crop marks near Stonehenge revealed a variety of 6,000-year-old prehistoric subterranean structures.

Another example is the rediscovery of the Roman city Altinum, a precursor to the city of Venice, from a combination of visible and near-infrared photos of the area taken during a drought in 2007, which stressed the maize and soy crops.

The multi period site at Mucking was discovered as a result of aerial photographs showing cropmarks and soil marks. The earliest photographs to reveal the site were taken by the Luftwaffe in 1943. The importance of the site was recognised following photographs taken by Kenneth St Joseph in 1959 (published in 1964). In 1982, Margaret Jones (site director at the Mucking excavation) said that some sites were being interpreted on crop mark evidence alone. She said that some features do not produce crop marks and that some crop marks, when excavated, turn out not to be what they seem.

== See also ==
- Archaeological field survey
- Aerial archaeology
- Crop circle
- Shadow marks
