= Ben Cunnington =

Ben Cunnington may refer to:

- Ben Cunnington (archaeologist) (1861–1950), British archaeologist
- Ben Cunnington (footballer) (born 1991), Australian rules footballer

== See also ==
- Cunnington (surname)
