= St Lythans burial chamber =

Megalithic dolmen in Wales

- Siambr Gladdu Llwyneliddon (Welsh)
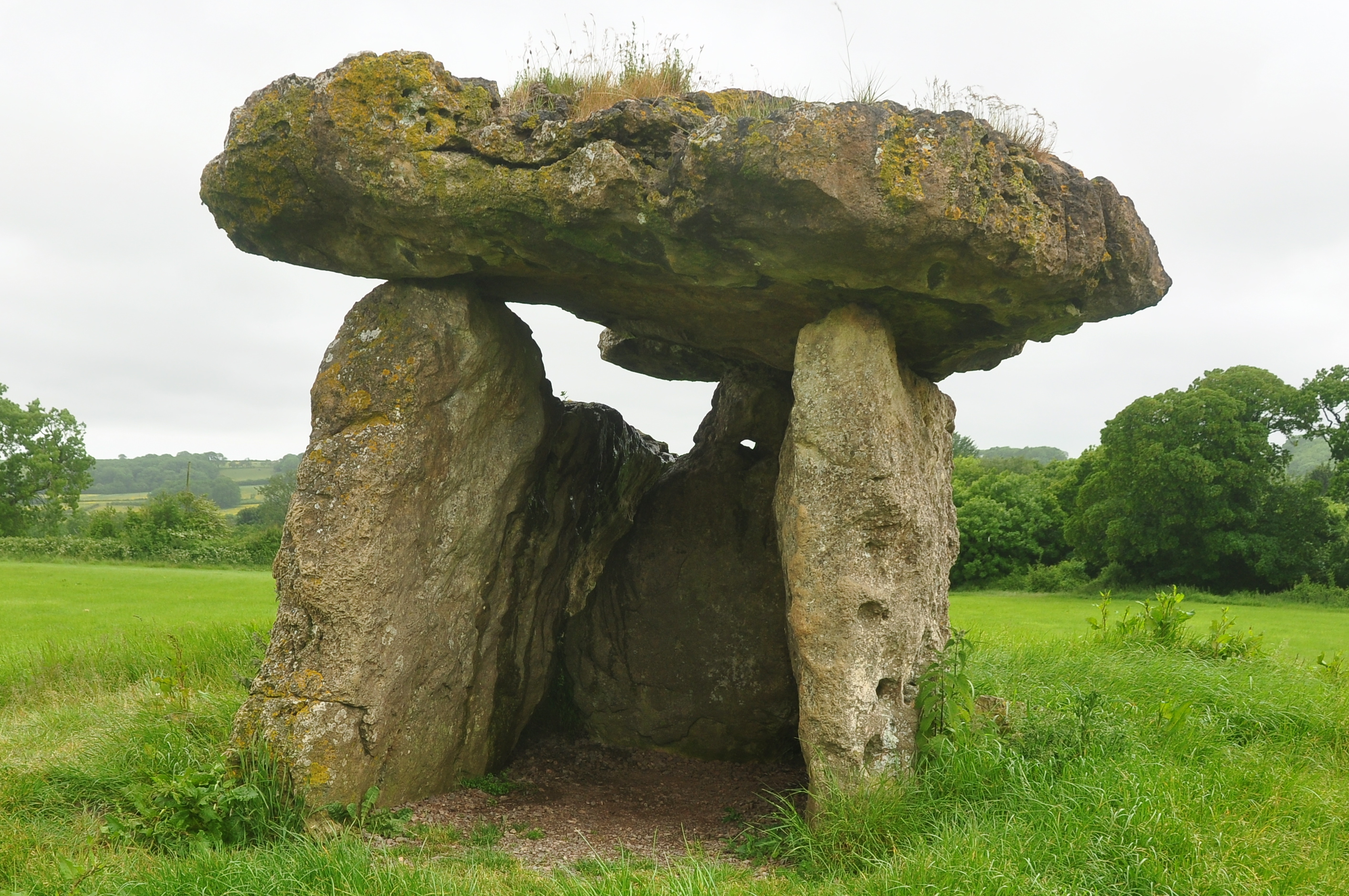

- Location of St Lythans burial chamber in the Vale of Glamorgan
- 51°26′33.11″N 3°17′41.68″W
- Type: Dolmen
- Periods: Neolithic
- Location: Wenvoe, Wales, United Kingdom

History
- Built: c. 4000 BC

Site notes
- Material: Stone
- Width: 27 m (89 ft)
- Condition: some damage
- Public access: Free

Scheduled monument
- Reference no.: GM008

The St Lythans burial chamber (Welsh: Siambr Gladdu Llwyneliddon) is a single stone megalithic dolmen, built around 4000 BC as part of a chambered long barrow, during the mid Neolithic period, in what is now known as the Vale of Glamorgan, Wales.

It lies about half a mile (1 km) to the west of the hamlet of St Lythans, near Dyffryn Gardens. It also lies around one mile (1.6 km) south of Tinkinswood burial chamber, a more extensive cromlech that it may once have resembled, constructed during the same period.

The site is on pasture land, but pedestrian access is allowed and is free, with roadside parking available for 2–3 cars about 50 yards (50 metres) from the site.

The dolmen, which has never been fully excavated, is maintained by Cadw, the Welsh Historic Environment Agency.

== Location ==
The burial chamber stands in a field, Maesyfelin (The Mill Field), often shared by a herd of cows, to the south of St Lythans Road. Roadside parking is maintained by Cadw (to keep/protect), the Welsh Historic Environment Agency. Access to the field, which slopes gently downwards towards the north west, is permitted, and is free, via a kissing gate. There is no wheelchair access, although there is an uninterrupted view of the site from the gate, about 50 yards (50 metres) away.

== Features ==
This chamber tomb is a dolmen, the most common form of megalithic structure in Europe. It stands at the eastern end of a flat topped, 27-metre-long (89 ft), 11-metre-wide (36 ft) earthen mound, forming part of a chambered long barrow. It is one of the Severn-Cotswold type, and consists of a cove of three upright stones (orthostats) supporting a large, flat capstone. All the stones are mudstone, and, as with those used at Tinkinswood, were probably available locally. The capstone, which slopes downwards from southeast to northwest (the left side of the entrance towards the back right), measures 4 m (13 ft) long, 3 m (9.8 ft) wide, and 0.7 metres (2 ft) thick. The insides of the two facing, rectangular uprights have been smoothed off and there is a port-hole at the top of the triangular rear stone, similar to some other dolmens, such as at Trethevy Quoit, in Cornwall. The burial chamber has a minimum internal height of 1.8 metres (6 ft) and is in an east/west alignment, with the entrance facing east. As with most cromlechs, it is likely that originally, the burial chamber would have had a forecourt immediately outside the entrance to the chamber and the chamber would have been covered by a mound of earth and smaller stones. This has either been eroded or removed over time, leaving only a much lower barrow behind the current structure. However, as the chamber is unusually tall, it is possible that the capstone was never fully covered.

== History ==
=== Prehistoric origins ===
From the end of the last ice age (between 10,000 and 12,000 BP), mesolithic hunter-gatherers from Central Europe began to migrate to Great Britain. They would have been able to walk between Continental Europe and Great Britain on dry land, prior to the post glacial rise in sea level, up until between 6,000 and 7,000 BP. As the area was heavily wooded and movement would have been restricted, it is likely that people also came to what was to become known as Wales by boat from the Iberian Peninsula. These neolithic colonists integrated with the indigenous people, gradually changing their lifestyles from a nomadic life of hunting and gathering, to become settled farmers. They cleared the forests to establish pasture and to cultivate the land. They built the long barrow at St Lythans around 6,000 BP, about 1,500 years before either Stonehenge or The Egyptian Great Pyramid of Giza was completed. There are over 150 other cromlechs all over Wales, such as Pentre Ifan in Pembrokeshire (Sir Benfro) and Bryn Celli Ddu, on Anglesey (Ynys Môn), of the same period.

=== Purpose ===
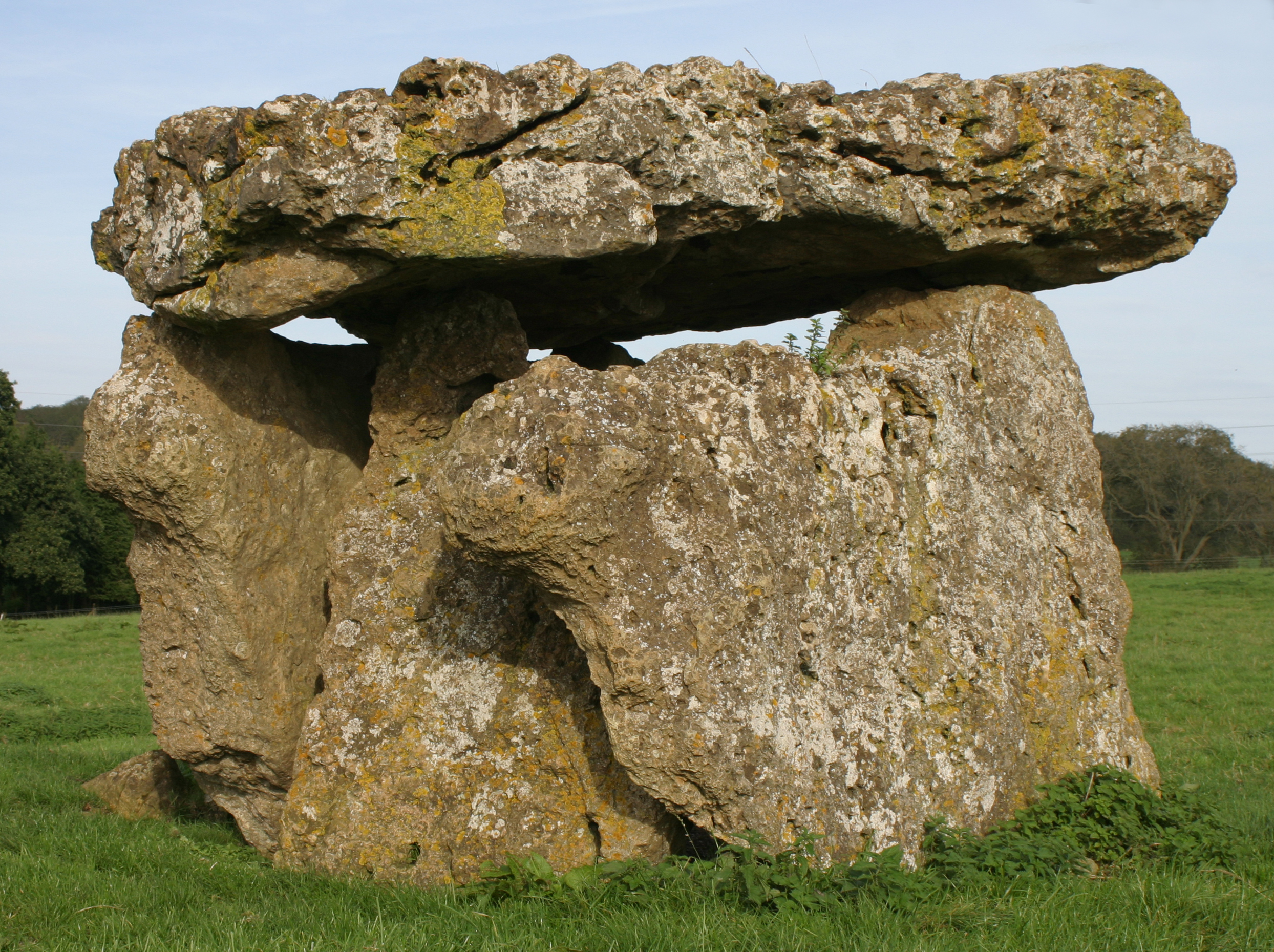
St Lythans burial chamber, from the south west

As well as places to house and to honour the dead, these cromlechs may have been communal and ceremonial sites where, according to Francis Pryor, people would meet "to socialise, to meet new partners, to acquire fresh livestock and to exchange ceremonial gifts". The corpses of the dead were probably left exposed, before the bones were moved into the burial chamber.

=== New cultures ===
In common with the people living all over Great Britain, over the following centuries the people living around what is now known as St Lythans assimilated new immigrants and exchanged ideas of the Bronze Age and Iron Age Celtic cultures. Together with the approximate areas now known as Brecknockshire, Monmouthshire and the rest of Glamorgan, St Lythans was settled by a Celtic British tribe called the Silures.

Although the Roman occupation left no physical impression on St Lythans, its people embraced the Roman religion of Christianity and dedicated a church to St Bleddian, who had been sent to Britain to stamp out the Pelagian Heresy. The current Church of St Bleddian, in St Lythans, a listed grade II* building, known locally as St Lythan's Church, was built about 2/3 mile (about 1 km) to the east of this site and has an ancient yew tree in the churchyard.

=== Recent local history ===
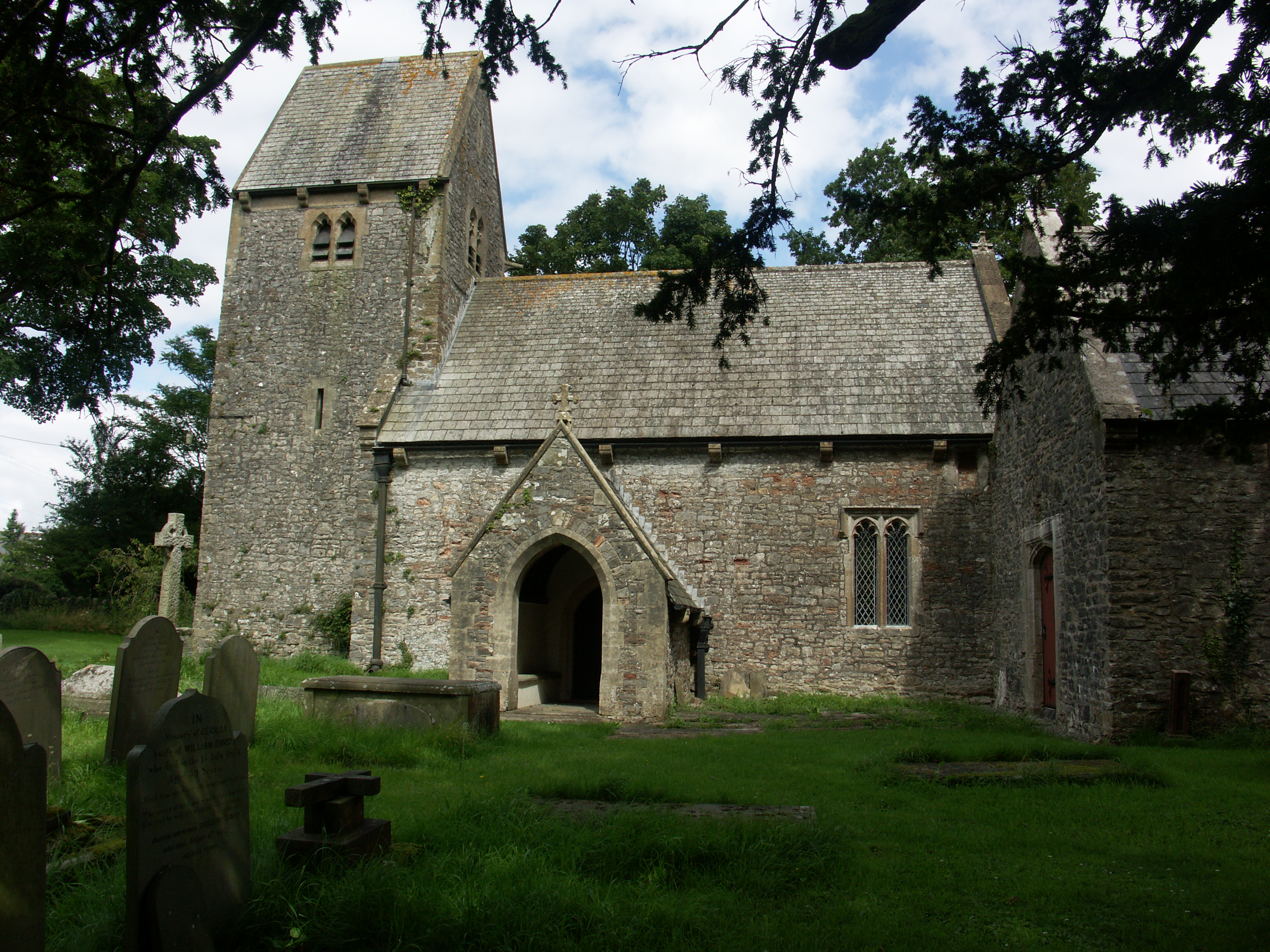
St Lythans Church

In the 16th century, the manor was acquired by the Button family, who built the first house about 500 yards (0.5 km) north west of the tumulus. The Manor's name was changed to Dyffryn St Nicholas and the house rebuilt in the 18th century, when the estate was purchased by Thomas Pryce. Commenting on St Lythans in his 'A Topographical Dictionary of The Dominion of Wales', London, 1811, Nicholas Carlisle, says "The Resident Population of this Parish, in 1801, was 72. It is 6m. W. S.W. from Caerdiff (sic)." and notes that "Here is a Druidical Altar." By 1831 the population had grown by over 50% ("Lythan's, St. (St. Lythian), a parish in the hundred of Dinas-Powis, county of Glamorgan, South Wales, 6 miles (9.7 km) (W. S. W.) from Cardiff, containing 103 inhabitants.") and Dyffryn House was being used as "a school for all the poor children of this parish". By now, the dolmen had been correctly identified: "There is a cromlech on St. Lythan's common." (From 'A Topographical Dictionary of Wales' by Samuel Lewis, 1833). Census records show that St Lythans' population fluctuated between 81 (1881) and 136 (1861) over the rest of the 19th century. In 1939, the Dyffryn Estate was leased to the Glamorgan County Council for 999 years.

== Local folklore ==
St Lythans Burial Chamber is also known as Gwâl y Filiast (English: The Greyhound Bitch's Kennel) — the site had been used as an animal shelter in the early 19th century – and Maes y Felin (The Mill Field), apparently from the legend that, each Midsummer's Eve, the capstone spins around three times and all the stones go to the nearby river to bathe. The cromlech stands in a field known as the "Accursed Field", so called due to its supposed infertility. However, Julian Cope (born about 25 miles (40 km) to the north, in Deri, Caerphilly) has suggested the name may have derived from "Field O'Koeur". The name could be a variant of the Arthurian legend of Culhwch and Olwen, which appears in two fourteenth-century Welsh texts, but the site itself is very much older dating from the Neolithic period, some 5,000 to 6,000 years ago.

== Analysis of contemporary local sites ==
Few human remains survive from this period, the early Neolithic (c 6400 BP–5300 BP), although they are comparatively well preserved in the Black Mountains, Gower and the Vale of Glamorgan, where up to 50 individuals, of all ages, have been interred — men, women and children — in each cromlech. Minor excavation was carried out at St Lythans by William Collings Lukis in 1875. However his notes are regarded as "poorly-recorded". A report noted in 1976 that "Human remains and coarse pottery were found in 1875 in the debris thrown out from the interior, which partly fills the hollow of the original forecourt in the E (sic) end of the mound." Some surface finds from the cromlech are held in the St Fagans National History Museum, Cardiff. They are a fine leaf-shaped flint arrowhead, a fragment of polished stone axe and several flight flakes. Conservation work was carried out on the eroded barrow in 1992–93, when soil and turfs were replaced to cover the exposed areas. The St Lythans site has not yet been fully excavated. However, results from excavations of other sites are worth noting:

=== Parc Cwm long cairn ===
Musculoskeletal analysis of the human remains found at Parc Cwm long cairn (carn hir Parc Cwm), Gower, has shown significant gender lifestyle variation. Male muscular development is greater — possibly from hunting or herding. In contrast, no such variation was noticeable in the remains found during the excavation from the nearby Tinkinswood burial chamber.

=== Goldsland Wood ===
Remains from seven neolithic humans have been excavated from a cave at Goldsland Wood, Wenvoe, near the cromlech at St Lythans, together with pottery and flint blades dating from between 5,000 and 5,600 BP. Although there is no evidence to show that the bones relate to the site, it is thought that the corpses had been placed there until they had decomposed. The skeletons would then have been removed to sites such as the St Lythans Burial Chamber or the Tinkinswood Burial Chamber. This appears to be the sole site found in Britain where corpses have been left to rot prior to placement in communal tombs. Most of the remains recovered were small pieces of jaw, fingers or toes. The Tinkinswood site contained human remains and pottery dating to the early Bronze Age, showing that such sites were used over many generations.

== See also ==
- Prehistoric Britain
- Standing stone
- Hunter-gatherers
- Neolithic Europe
- Long barrow
- Cove (standing stones)
- Cairn
- Tumulus
- Britons (historic)
- List of Cadw properties
- Welsh placenames

== Bibliography ==
- Douglass W. Bailey, Prehistoric Figurines: Representation and Corporeality in the Neolithic. (Routledge Publishers, 2005) ISBN 0-415-33152-8.
- Peter Bellwood, First Farmers: The Origins of Agricultural Societies. (Blackwell Publishers, 2004) ISBN 0-631-20566-7
- Timothy Darvill, "Long Barrows of the Cotswolds and surrounding areas" (Publisher: Tempus Publishing, 2004) ISBN 0-7524-2907-8
- Prys Morgan (Ed), "History of Wales 25,000 B.C. A.D. 2000" (Publisher: Tempus Publishing, 2001) ISBN 0-7524-1983-8
- Frances Lynch, "Megalithic Tombs and Long Barrows in Britain" (Publisher: Shire Publications Ltd, 1997) ISBN 0-7478-0341-2
- A. Caseldine, "Environmental Archaeology in Wales" (Publisher: Lampeter: St David's University College Department of Archaeology, 1990)
- Paul Ashbee, "The Earthen Long Barrow in Britain: An Introduction to the Study of the Funerary Practice and Culture of the Neolithic People of the Third Millennium B.C." (Publisher: Geo Books, 1984) ISBN 0-86094-170-1
- Ian Hodder Burials, houses, women and men in the European Neolithic, D Miller and C Tilley (eds), Architecture and Order (Oxford, Basil Blackwell, 1984)
- Mark Nathan Cohen, The Food Crisis in Prehistory: Overpopulation and the Origins of Agriculture. (New Haven and London: Yale University Press, 1977) ISBN 0-300-02016-3.
- "St Lythans burial chamber". Megalithic Portal.
