= South Street barrow =

Archaeological site in Wiltshire, England

Coordinates: 51.422°N 1.872°W

The South Street barrow is a Neolithic long barrow in the English county of Wiltshire, near Beckhampton. It lies around 70 metres southeast of the cove of The Longstones and may therefore be connected with the Neolithic ritual landscape centred on Avebury.

The mound was about 43 metres long and 17m wide, but cultivation has spread the material and reduced the mound's height.

It was excavated between 1964 and 1966 by Paul Ashbee who found no evidence of burials beneath the barrow and conjectured that it was a kind of cenotaph. He found that it had been built around a number of wicker partitions using alternate layers of white chalk and darker earth. This material was probably excavated from flanking ditches surrounding the site, which survive as infilled features.
