= Knap Hill =

Earthwork in Wiltshire, England

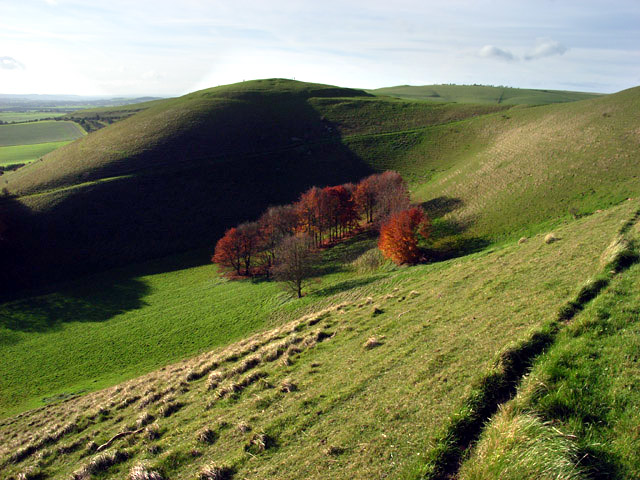

- Location within Wiltshire
- 51°22′19″N 01°49′38″W
- Type: Causewayed enclosure
- Location: Wiltshire, England

Site notes
- Area: 2.4 ha

Scheduled monument
- Official name: Knap Hill camp near Alton Priors
- Reference no.: 1005704

Knap Hill lies on the northern rim of the Vale of Pewsey, in northern Wiltshire, England, about a mile (1.6 km) north of the village of Alton Priors. At the top of the hill is a causewayed enclosure, a form of Neolithic earthwork that was constructed in England from about 3700 BC onwards, characterized by the full or partial enclosure of an area with ditches that are interrupted by gaps, or causeways. Their purpose is not known: they may have been settlements, or meeting places, or ritual sites of some kind. The site has been scheduled as an ancient monument.

Knap Hill is notable as the first causewayed enclosure to be excavated and identified. In 1908 and 1909, Benjamin and Maud Cunnington spent two summers investigating the site, and Maud published two reports of their work, noting that there were several gaps in the ditch and bank surrounding the enclosure. In the late 1920s, after the excavation of Windmill Hill and other sites, it became apparent that causewayed enclosures were a characteristic monument of the Neolithic period. About a thousand causewayed enclosures have now been found in Europe, including around seventy in Britain.

This site was excavated again in 1961 by Graham Connah, who kept thorough stratigraphic documentation. In 2011, the Gathering Time project published an analysis of radiocarbon dates which included several new dates from Connah's finds. It concluded that there was a 91% chance that the Knap Hill enclosure was constructed between 3530 and 3375 BC.

Two barrows lay within the Neolithic enclosure, and at least one more outside it. The hilltop also contains the remains of a Romano-British settlement on an adjoining smaller area called the plateau enclosure, along with some evidence of occupation in the 17th century. An Anglo-Saxon sword was found in the smaller enclosure, and there is evidence of an intense fire in the same area, which implies a violent end to the Romano-British occupation of the hilltop.

== Background ==
The main archaeological site at Knap Hill is a causewayed enclosure, a form of earthwork which began to be constructed in England in the early Neolithic, from about 3700 BC. (Both the causewayed enclosure and the hill itself are referred to as Knap Hill.) Causewayed enclosures are areas that are fully or partially enclosed by segmented ditches (that is, ditches interrupted by gaps, or causeways, of unexcavated ground), often with earthworks and palisades in some combination. How these enclosures were used has long been a matter of debate, and researchers have made many suggestions. They were previously known as "causewayed camps", since it was thought they were used as settlements: early investigators suggested that the inhabitants lived in the ditches, but this idea was later abandoned in favour of believing that any settlement was within the enclosure boundaries.

In a 1912 report on an excavation at Knap Hill, it was assumed that the ramparts were a form of defence. The causeways were difficult to explain in military terms, though it was suggested they could have been sally ports for defenders to emerge from and attack a besieging force; evidence of attacks at some sites provided support for the idea that the enclosures were fortified settlements. (Note: For example, there is evidence that both Crickley Hill and Hambledon Hill were attacked.) They may have been seasonal meeting places, used for trading cattle or other goods such as pottery, and if they were a focus for the local people, they may have been evidence of a local hierarchy with a tribal chief. There is also evidence that they played a role in funeral rites: material such as food, pottery, and human remains were deliberately deposited in the ditches. They were constructed in a short time, which implies significant organization since substantial labour would have been required, for clearing the land, preparing trees for use as posts or palisades, and digging the ditches.

In 1930, the archaeologist Cecil Curwen identified sixteen sites that were definitely or probably Neolithic causewayed enclosures. Excavations at five of these had already confirmed them as Neolithic, and another four of Curwen's sites are now agreed to be Neolithic. A few more were found over the succeeding decades, and the list of known sites was significantly expanded with the use of aerial photography in the 1960s and early 1970s.

The earlier sites were mostly found on chalk uplands, but many of the ones discovered from the air were on lower-lying ground. Over seventy are known in the British Isles, and they are one of the most common types of early Neolithic site in western Europe, with about a thousand known in all. They began to appear at different times in different parts of Europe: the dates range from before 4000 BC for such sites in northern France, to shortly before 3000 BC in northern Germany, Denmark and Poland. The enclosures in southern Britain and Ireland began to appear not long before 3700 BC, and continued to be built for at least 200 years. In a few cases, enclosures that had already been built continued to be used as late as 3300 to 3200 BC.

== Site ==
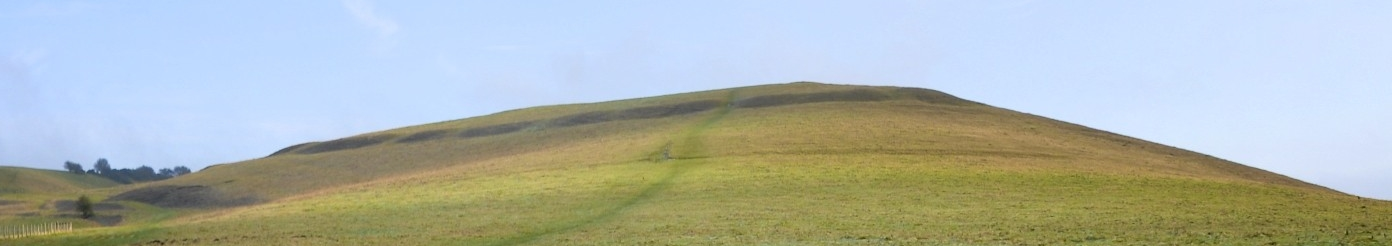
Knap Hill

Knap Hill is in Wiltshire, about a mile (1.6 km) north of the village of Alton Priors. It is part of the chalk hills that form the northern rim of the Vale of Pewsey, and is flanked by Golden Ball Hill to the east, and Walker Hill to the west. Golden Ball Hill has traces of Mesolithic activity, and two other Neolithic sites are nearby: Adam's Grave, a chambered long barrow on Walker Hill, and Rybury, a causewayed enclosure, two miles (3.2 km) further west. The south side of the hill is the steepest, with more gradual slopes to the north and west. A narrow neck of land connects it to Golden Ball Hill to the east. At one time there were two round barrows inside the enclosure; one of these was destroyed in the 19th century by flint diggers. A third barrow lies just outside the causewayed enclosure, to the south-west, and a fourth barrow may also have existed to the south, though the records that refer to it may be a confused reference to the third barrow.

The Neolithic causewayed enclosure on the top of Knap Hill consists of a ditch, and a bank inside it, that run along the north-western edge of the hilltop and extend partway down the south-western and north-eastern sides, with some of the bank extending past the ditch at the north-eastern edge. Both the ditch and the bank were built in seven segments, with six gaps, or causeways, between the segments. Another short ditch at the eastern corner of the hill was divided into two sections, but no ditch or bank has yet been found along the southern edge of the hilltop. Knap Hill is unusual in that the gaps in the ditch correspond exactly to those in the bank; in most sites, there were at least three times as many gaps in the ditch as in the bank. The area of the enclosure is about 2.4 hectares (5.9 acres).

To the north-east of the enclosure lies a smaller archaeological site known as the plateau enclosure, which dates from before and during the Romano-British occupation. The plateau enclosure was also occupied in the 1600s, perhaps by shepherds. A bank, with a ditch on either side, runs from the south-eastern corner of the causewayed enclosure down the hill, which is too steep for this to have been a pathway. Similarly, from one of the causeways on the north-western edge, a bank runs down the hill, this time with only one parallel ditch. Both were probably boundary ditches.

Knap Hill is an example of an upland-oriented enclosure: it is on a prominent hill, which makes it a dramatic location when viewed from the south, but the land on which the enclosure is constructed tilts towards the upland to the north of the hill. Several other upland enclosures are similarly situated, and this is probably not by chance. Whitesheet Hill, Combe Hill and Rybury are other examples of enclosures that are hard to identify when seen from the lower ground below them, but which are much more visible viewed from the neighbouring uplands. The archaeologist Roger Mercer considered Knap Hill to be "the most striking of all causewayed enclosures", and recommended viewing it from the road to the west that runs from Marlborough to Alton Priors. The site has been scheduled as an ancient monument.

== Antiquarian and archaeological investigations ==
Knap Hill was first mentioned as being of antiquarian interest in 1680, by John Aubrey, who described it as "a small Roman camp above Alton". Richard Colt Hoare mentioned Knap Hill early in the 19th century, (Note: Hoare included Knap Hill in his two-volume compendium of Wiltshire antiquities, Ancient History of North and South Wiltshire and History of Ancient Wiltshire, published between 1812 and 1821.) noting "two small barrows, and another on the outside".

=== John Thurnam, 1850s ===
John Thurnam investigated the barrows between 1853 and 1857, but found the easternmost of the two barrows within the enclosure had been destroyed by flint diggers, with no trace left. The western barrow was about two feet (60 cm) high, with a small ditch around it. Near the top of the barrow Thurnam found animal bones, which he described as "of a sheep and perhaps other ruminants", and commented in his account that this was consistent with other barrows in Wiltshire, which often contained animal bones near the surface of the barrow. He speculated that they were probably from a sacrifice or feast over the graves. Under the middle of the barrow was a circular hole dug into the chalk, two feet (60 cm) deep and two feet (60 cm) across. It was almost full of ashes and burnt bones. The barrow outside the enclosure, which lay to the south-west, was about a foot (30 cm) high and Thurnam found nothing there but some animal bones near the surface.

=== Benjamin and Maud Cunnington, 1908–1909 ===
The Neolithic enclosure was first excavated by Maud and Benjamin Cunnington, in the summers of 1908 and 1909. The first summer's investigation revealed the segmented nature of the earthworks, and led to the publication of a short note by Maud Cunnington in the journal Man in 1909, in which she asked readers of the journal to suggest explanations:

Recent excavations [at] Knap Hill Camp in Wiltshire revealed a feature which, if intentional, appears to be a method of defence hitherto unobserved in prehistoric fortifications in Britain... There are six openings or gaps through the rampart. It was thought at first that ... some of these gaps were due to cattle tracks, or possibly had been made for agricultural purposes... Excavations clearly showed that none of these gaps in the rampart are the result of wear or of any accidental circumstance, but that they are actually part of the original construction of the camp... Outside of, and corresponding to, each gap the ditch was never dug; that is to say, a solid gangway or causeway of unexcavated ground has been left in each case... Given the need for an entrenchment at all, it seems at first sight inexplicable why these frequent openings should have been left, when apparently they so weaken the whole construction... It has been suggested ... that the work of fortifications was never finished, [but there is] considerable evidence in favour of these causeways being an intentional feature of the original design of the camp... The possible use which the gangways may have served is put forward with all diffidence, and any suggestion on the subject would be welcomed.

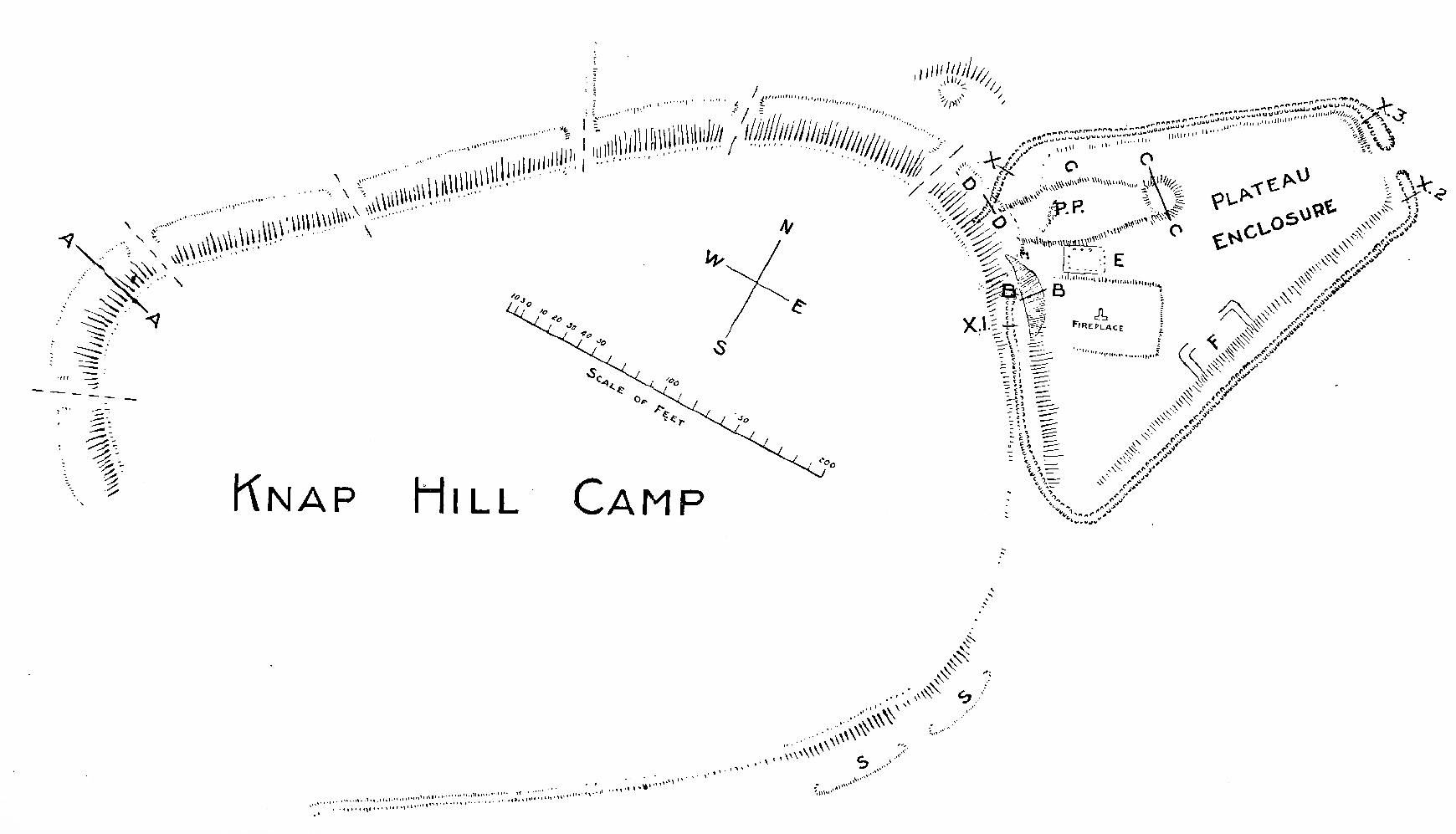
Map of Knap Hill showing the Cunningtons' excavations of 1908 and 1909. Letters A through D, and X through X3, mark trenches cut or areas excavated by the Cunningtons; E and F are building foundations, and G is where the Saxon sword was found. The two pits found under the long mound are each labelled P, and the short sections of ditch found at the eastern corner are labelled S. Dotted lines crossing the boundary indicate the location of the causeways.

This was the first time that causewayed ditches had been identified, though earlier excavations had taken place at sites now known to be causewayed enclosures. (Note: For example, Peu-Richard, in western France, was excavated in 1882 by Baron Eschassériaux.) By the time the second summer's work had been completed, every causeway had been excavated sufficiently to prove that the ditches ended where they appeared to from what could be seen of them above ground.

Maud Cunnington described the excavation in a 1912 paper. She and Benjamin excavated a 54 feet (16 m) long stretch of one of the ditches, and discovered that the width and depth varied greatly, from seven feet (2.1 m) deep and ten feet (3.0 m) wide at the bottom at the west end of the section, to eight feet (2.4 m) deep and only eighteen inches (0.46 m) wide at the bottom at the east end. They also made cuttings along the southern edge of the hilltop to determine if a ditch existed there which was no longer visible on the surface, and found two short ditch sections at the eastern corner (marked S–S on the plan).

Most of the relics obtained from the ditches were found in clusters, and were usually within a foot (30 cm) of the bottom; they included some sherds of pottery, flint flakes and burnt flints, fragments of animal bones, and pieces of sarsen stone. The only human bone found was a small jaw bone with worn teeth. The pottery was coarse, with flint inclusions, and was found associated with flint flakes, leading Maud Cunnington to suggest that the people who used the pottery may have been Neolithic, though she concluded that the inability to tell undecorated pottery of the Bronze Age and Neolithic periods apart meant that it was not possible to confidently assign a period. The Cunningtons found several flint-knapping clusters, including one group of seventy-two flint chips six feet (1.8 m) deep in the ditch.

The discovery of a second enclosure, to the north-east of the original target of their excavation, complicated the Cunningtons' work. To distinguish it from the "Old Camp", the new enclosure was labelled the "Plateau Enclosure" in Maud Cunnington's published paper. It was clear to Cunnington that the plateau enclosure was much more recent than the old enclosure, since the plateau enclosure's south-western ditch was dug through the old enclosure's ditch, which had silted up almost completely by that time. Cunnington considered the plateau enclosure to have been constructed no earlier than the early Iron Age. The ditch and low rampart that surrounded the enclosure were mostly undetectable on the surface; the Cunningtons cut sections around the perimeter at intervals to confirm their path.

A gap was also found in the plateau enclosure ditch at the south-western edge, where it overlapped with the old enclosure, but Cunnington could not tell what the gap was for—an entrance was implausible as the bank was very steep at that point. The pottery found in the plateau ditch and bank was of much better quality than the coarse Neolithic pottery associated with the old enclosure: it included bead-rim pottery which Cunnington dated to just before or during the early years of the Roman occupation.

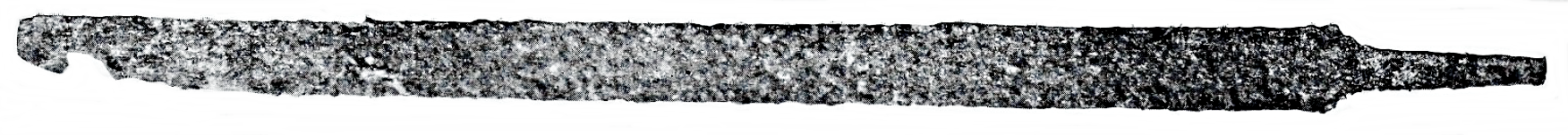
Anglo-Saxon sword found in the plateau enclosure by the Cunningtons

Within the plateau enclosure was a long bank, running from south-west to north-east, with a circular mound at the north-eastern end. The Cunningtons found pottery sherds in the long bank that Maud Cunnington dated to Roman times. They also found in the centre of the bank that two pits lay beneath it, each marked P. on the plan. These had been dug from the ground level before the bank was raised, and were both circular, about two feet (60 cm) deep, and 3.5 to 4 ft (1.1–1.2 m) in diameter. These contained flint flakes, coarse pottery and some animal bones, and Cunnington concluded that they were contemporary with the old enclosure and that it was a coincidence the long bank was raised over them.

A 6th-century Anglo-Saxon iron sword was found towards the edge of the long mound (at G on the plan). A round fire hole was found under the circular mound, containing wood ash and pottery, some of which Cunnington identified as Roman. Another fireplace was found to the south-east of the long mound, in a rectangular area of raised earth (which Cunnington referred to as the dais); this fireplace was T-shaped, and contained the lower stone of a quern, damaged by heat, four iron nails, and several fragments of pottery. Cunnington suggested that the fireplace must have been unusable once the quern was in it, and that this, along with the presence of the sword and the evidence of intense heat, implied a violent end to the occupation of the enclosure.

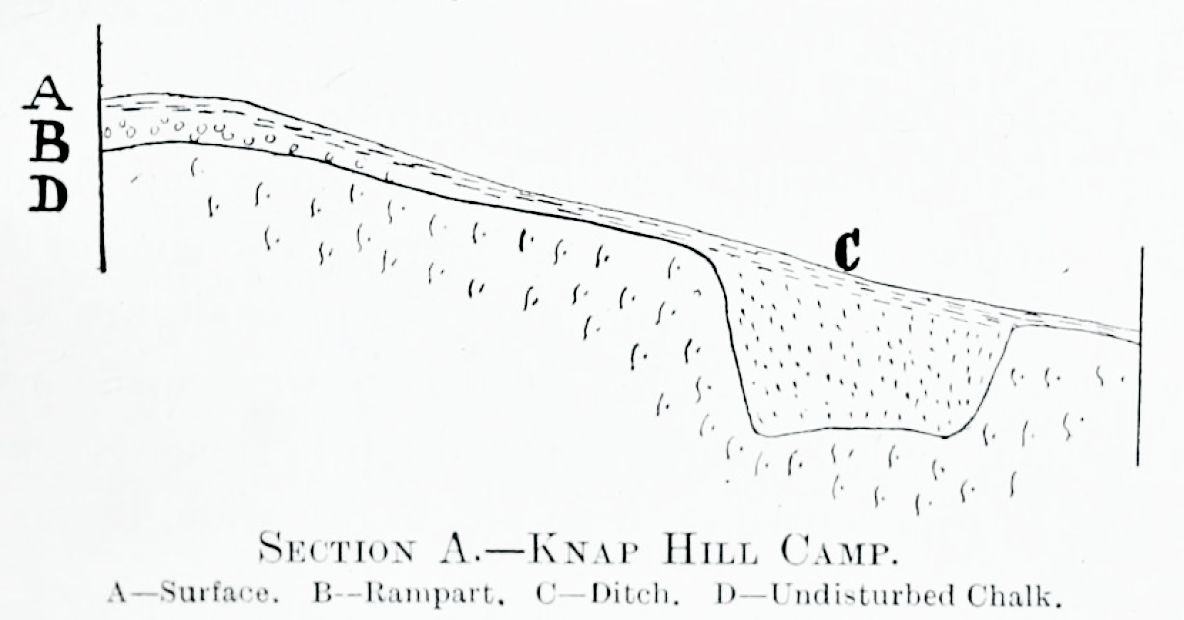
Section through the ditch at cutting A-A in the 1908–1909 excavation

Between the long bank and the dais were the remains of a small building (marked E on the plan), 23 by 13.5 ft (7.0 by 4.1 m), with walls made of blocks of chalk. Postholes were found at intervals in the walls. A rubbish pile next to the building yielded a sherd of 17th-century pottery, and in the area of the building and the dais were numerous clay pipes, some of which retained their makers' stamps and so could be dated with accuracy. The pipes and the pottery sherds from this area both were dated to the 17th century, mixed with Roman pottery in the dais. Cunnington concluded that the dais had been cultivated by the 17th-century inhabitants of the hilltop, since that would have led to turning the soil on the dais and mixing the sherds at different levels. The ruins of another rectangular building (F on the plan) were found against the eastern side of the plateau enclosure's bank, with both Roman and 17th-century pottery sherds in the walls and under the foundations. It was apparent that the building had been erected after the plateau enclosure had been built, but the Cunningtons found no other evidence that would help determine its date.

The Cunningtons also opened the barrow outside the old enclosure, to the south-west (not marked on their plan, but labelled "Grinsell 10" on Connah's plan, below), and found a skeleton fairly near the surface, face down. It was missing all the bones of the legs and feet, and the right hand; Maud Cunnington speculated that the body had been buried so near the surface of the barrow that the missing bones had been disturbed by animals. The only pottery sherds found were from the Roman period and were all near the surface, implying that the burial preceded the Roman occupation.

Two low banks were found, running down the hill: one from the two ditches marked S on the plan, and one on the other side of the enclosure, leading down from one of the causeways on the north-western edge. The one to the east was known locally as "The Devil's Trackway". The north-western bank led for fifty yards (46 m) towards an old track across the hill.

=== C. W. Phillips, 1939 ===
In 1939 C. W. Phillips excavated a bowl barrow outside the enclosure, but never published a report. Two barrows outside the enclosure are listed in a gazetteer of Wiltshire by Leslie Grinsell, published in 1957, identified as Alton 10 and Alton 13. Phillips excavated Alton 13, but it may be that the two barrows are the same, in which case the barrow Phillips excavated was the same one that Thurnam investigated in the 1850s. Phillips found a crouched burial, at the old ground surface, and Neolithic potsherds; the potsherds may not indicate that the barrow is of Neolithic date since the sherds might have been present on the site at the time the barrow was constructed. Grinsell cites Phillips to say that the barrow lay to the south of the causewayed enclosure, and if this is correct it is not the same barrow that Thurnam opened.

=== Graham Connah, 1961 ===
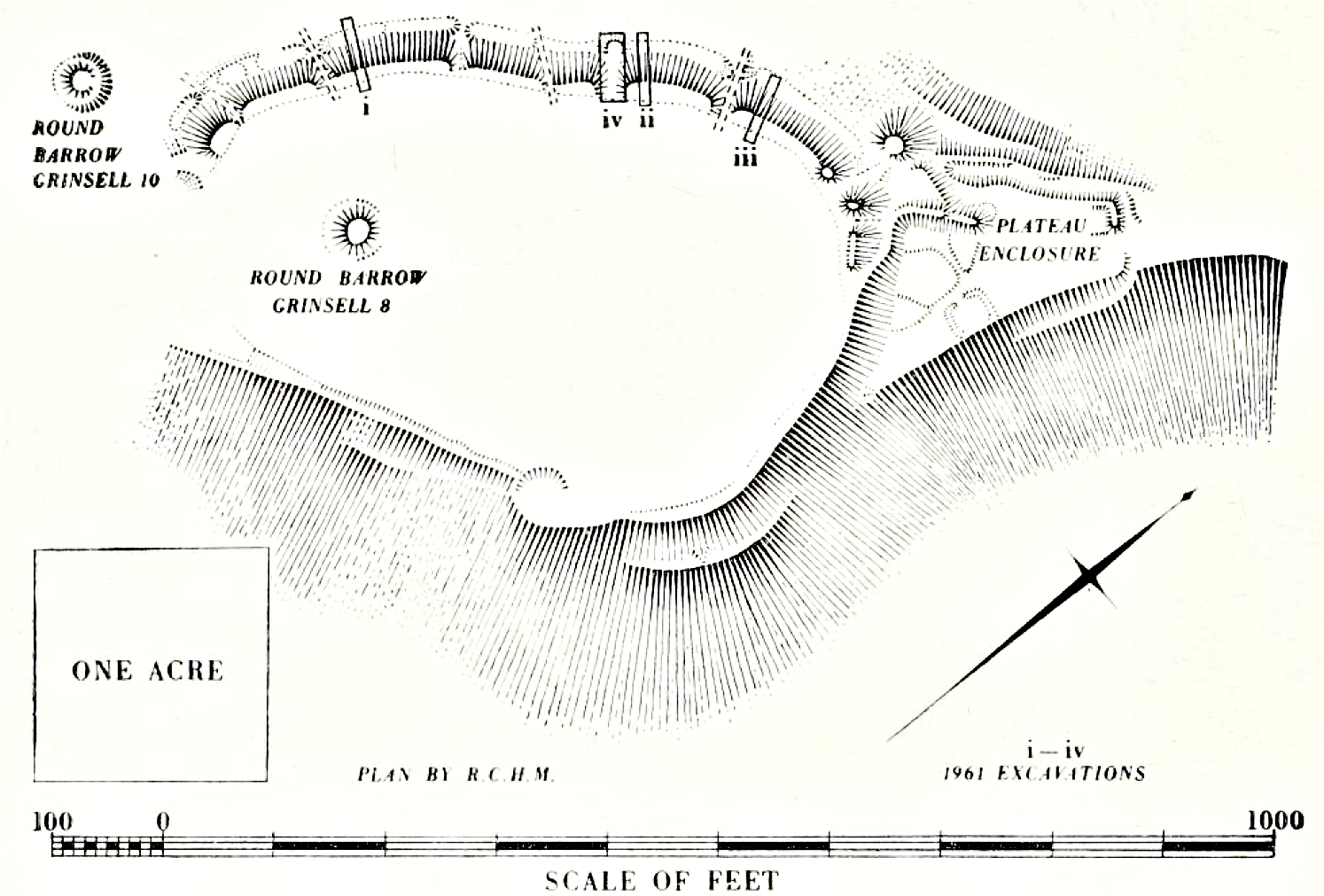
Knap Hill site, showing trenches (i through iii) and the excavated area (iv) from the 1961 excavation

In 1961, the causewayed enclosure was excavated again, by Graham Connah. Three trenches (i to iii in the diagram at right) were cut across three different segments of the ditches and banks, and one causeway (iv in the diagram) was fully excavated, including both ends of the two ditches abutting it. Like the Cunningtons, Connah found a knapping cluster at the surface of the chalk in one of his cuttings.

Connah found only a few sherds of pottery, and so combined his finds with those from the earlier excavation for analysis purposes, though some documentation on the exact provenance of the earlier finds had been lost since 1912. Most of the sherds found in 1961 had flint inclusions, but four sherds, from a single pot, had shell inclusions, and so must have come from at least 20 miles (32 km) away. Similar combinations of finds had been reported at Windmill Hill, Robin Hood's Ball, and Whitesheet Hill. Connah classified the pottery from the ditches as Windmill Hill ware, a classification current in the 1960s that attempted to identify individual cultures within the Neolithic, but since overturned in favour of separating Neolithic sites into Early and Late Neolithic.

In addition to the Windmill Hill ware, fragments from seven or eight pots of Beaker ware were found; Connah suggested they may have come from visits to the hill top, rather than an occupation. Connah also found some Romano-British pottery in his cuttings, including four Samian sherds, one of which could be dated to the late 1st century AD. Some later medieval pottery fragments were found in the upper layers of the cuttings, all of which may have originally been part of a single vessel. These sherds could not be accurately dated.

In one of the cuttings a skeleton of a woman was found, near the top of the ditch. Nails found around the feet were interpreted as the remains of boots that had been reinforced with them. Connah concluded that the skeleton probably dated to the Roman-British occupation, and that the Neolithic ditch was simply an area of conveniently soft ground for the burial. The woman was probably in her 40s when she died, and was about 5 feet 2 inches (1.57 m) tall. She suffered from osteoarthritis, and had abscesses in her jaw: an evaluation by the Duckworth Laboratory in Cambridge concluded that she "most probably suffered agonies".

Connah identified ditches on both sides of the bank leading down from the eastern corner of the causewayed enclosure, and his excavation of one of the causeways (marked "iv" on his plan) found a shallow ditch cut in the chalk along the line of the bank leading down the hill on that side, which lay beneath a ditch along one side of that bank. None of these ditches had been noticed by the Cunningtons. Connah concluded that both were likely to have been constructed to mark boundaries.

=== Gathering Time, 2011 ===
In 2011, the Gathering Time project published the results of a programme to reanalyse the radiocarbon dates of nearly 40 causewayed enclosures, using Bayesian analysis. Knap Hill was one of the sites included in the project. Connah had obtained two radiocarbon dates on samples gathered during the 1961 excavation, which he had published in 1969; these results were included in the Gathering Time analysis, and one was resampled and tested again. Five other samples drawn from Connah's finds were also radiocarbon dated, as Connah's stratigraphic recording was precise enough to make it possible to identify samples which had good association with the building of the enclosure. The conclusion was that there was a 91% chance that Knap Hill was constructed between 3530 and 3375 BC, and a 92% chance that the ditch had silted up at some time between 3525 and 3220 BC. The researchers concluded that it was likely that the site was in use for "a short duration, probably ... well under a century, and perhaps only a generation or two".

== Sources ==
- Andersen, Niels H. (2019) [2015]. "Causewayed Enclosures in Northern and Western Europe". In Fowler, Chris; Harding, Jan; Hofmann, Daniela (eds.). The Oxford Handbook of Neolithic Europe. Oxford: Oxford University Press. pp. 795–812. ISBN 978-0-19-883249-2.
- Connah, Graham (1969). "Radiocarbon dating for Knap Hill". Antiquity. 43 (172): 304–305. doi:10.1017/S0003598X00107483.
- Connah, Graham; Smith, I.F. (1965). "Excavations at Knap Hill, Alton Priors". Wiltshire Archaeological and Natural History Magazine. 60: 1–23.
- Cunnington, M.E. (1909). "On a remarkable feature in the entrenchments of Knap Hill Camp, Wiltshire". Man. 9: 49–52. doi:10.2307/2839810. JSTOR 2839810.
- Cunnington, M.E. (1912). "Knap Hill Camp". Wiltshire Archaeological and Natural History Magazine. 37: 42–65.
- Curwen, E. Cecil (1930). "Neolithic camps". Antiquity. 4 (13): 22–54. doi:10.1017/S0003598X00004178.
- Mercer, R.J. (1990). Causewayed Enclosures. Princes Risborough, UK: Shire Archaeology. ISBN 0-7478-0064-2.
- Murray, Tim (2007). Milestones in Archaeology: A Chronological Encyclopedia. Santa Barbara, California: ABC-CLIO. ISBN 978-1-57607-186-1.
- Oswald, Alastair; Dyer, Carolyn; Barber, Martin (2001). The Creation of Monuments: Neolithic Causewayed Enclosures in the British Isles. Swindon, UK: English Heritage. ISBN 1-873592-42-6.
- Pouncett, John (2008). "The Neolithic Period". In Adkins, Roy; Adkins, Lesley; Leitch, Victoria (eds.). The Handbook of British Archaeology. London: Constable. pp. 36–62. ISBN 978-1-84529-606-3.
- Thurnam, John (1860). "Examination of Barrows on the Downs of North Wiltshire". Wiltshire Archaeological and Natural History Magazine. 6: 317–336.
- Whittle, Alasdair; Bayliss, Alex; Healy, Frances (2015) [2011]. "The North Wiltshire Downs". In Whittle, Alasdair; Healy, Frances; Bayliss, Alex (eds.). Gathering Time: Dating the Early Neolithic Enclosures of Southern Britain and Ireland. Oxford: Oxbow. pp. 60–110. ISBN 978-1-84217-425-8.
- Whittle, Alasdair; Healy, Frances; Bayliss, Alex (2015) [2011]. "Gathering time: causewayed enclosures and the early Neolithic of southern Britain and Ireland". In Whittle, Alasdair; Healy, Frances; Bayliss, Alex (eds.). Gathering Time: Dating the Early Neolithic Enclosures of Southern Britain and Ireland. Oxford: Oxbow. pp. 1–16. ISBN 978-1-84217-425-8.
