= Bead (disambiguation) =

A bead is a decorative object.

Bead may also refer to:

- Bead (woodworking)
- Beadwork, an ornament or utensil made from beads
- Ferrite bead, a typically non-decorative passive electric component used to suppress high frequency noise in electronic circuits
- Anal beads, a sex toy consisting of multiple spheres or balls attached together in series
- Bead test, a type of chemical analysis
- Bead method, a process of cell disruption for releasing biological molecules contained in cells
- Broadband Equity, Access, and Deployment Program (BEAD), a United States federal funding program
- Tire bead is a term for the edge of a tire that sits on the wheel
- Weld bead, deposit of filler metal from a single welding pass on a welding joint
- Bead lily, a common name for several flowering plant species in genus Clintonia

== See also ==
- Bead-rim pottery
