= Cunnington =

Cunnington is a surname. Notable people with the surname include:

- Adam Cunnington, English footballer
- Ben Cunnington (archaeologist), British archaeologist
- Ben Cunnington (footballer), Australian rules footballer
- Cecil Willett Cunnington, British collector and historian of costume
- Daniel John Cunningham (1859–1909), British physician, zoologist and anatomist
- Douglas Cunnington, Canadian politician
- Eddie Cunnington, Scottish footballer
- Maud Cunnington, British archaeologist
- Phillis Emily Cunnington, British collector and historian of costume
- Shaun Cunnington, English footballer and football manager
- William Cunnington, British antiquarian
- William Alfred Cunnington British zoologist
