= The Longstones =

Two standing stones in Wiltshire, England

Coordinates: 51.42264°N 1.87339°W

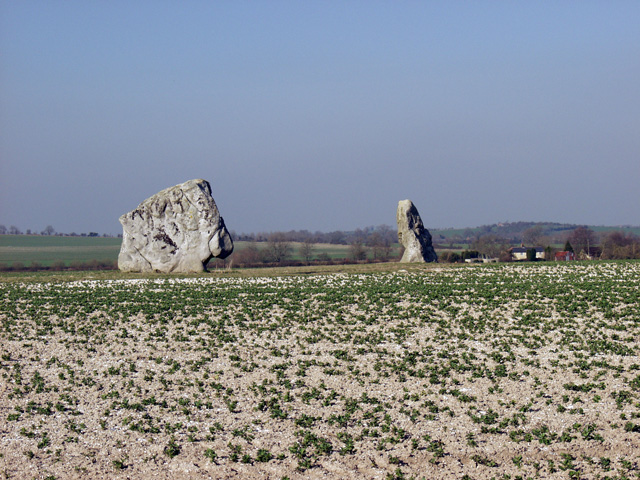
"Adam" and "Eve", the two Longstones

The Longstones are two standing stones, one of which is the remains of a prehistoric 'cove' of standing stones, at grid reference SU089693, close to Beckhampton in Avebury parish, in the English county of Wiltshire.

Two stones are visible, known as 'Adam' and 'Eve', although the latter is more likely to have been a stone that formed part of the Beckhampton Avenue that connected with Avebury. The avenue probably terminated here, although it may have extended further to the south-west beyond the stones. William Stukeley recorded the site in the 18th century when it was only partially destroyed, and suggested it extended further, although modern excavation and archaeological geophysics have not confirmed this.

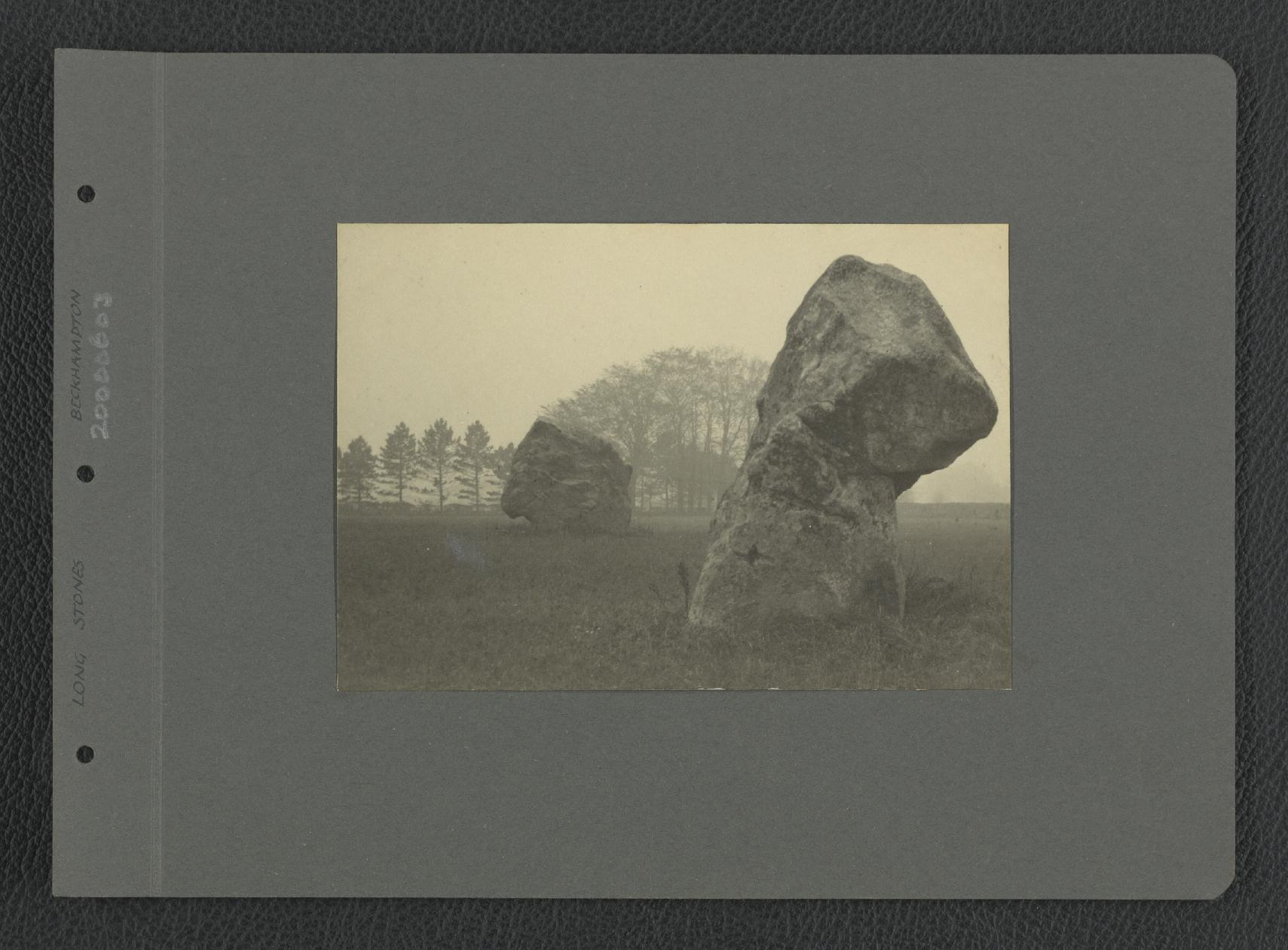
The Longstones, from Photo Album 20000603, held at the Alexander Keiller Museum.

Adam is the larger of the two stones, weighing an estimated 62 tons, and along with three others formed a four-sided cove. Excavations carried out jointly by the Universities of Leicester, Newport and Southampton in 2000 revealed the socket holes for the other stones which were tightly placed close to Adam. The cove had been open on its south-eastern side which faced towards the nearby South Street barrow, 130m away. The other stones were removed in the post-medieval period by a local landowner.

Adam fell over in 1911 and was re-erected by Maud Cunnington in 1912, at the direction of the Wiltshire Archaeological Society. She also found a Beaker inhumation of a middle-aged man buried close by the stone. In 1933 the stones were scheduled as an ancient monument.

== See also ==
- List of individual rocks
