= Tinkinswood =

Neolithic dolmen in Wales

Tinkinswood Burial Chamber
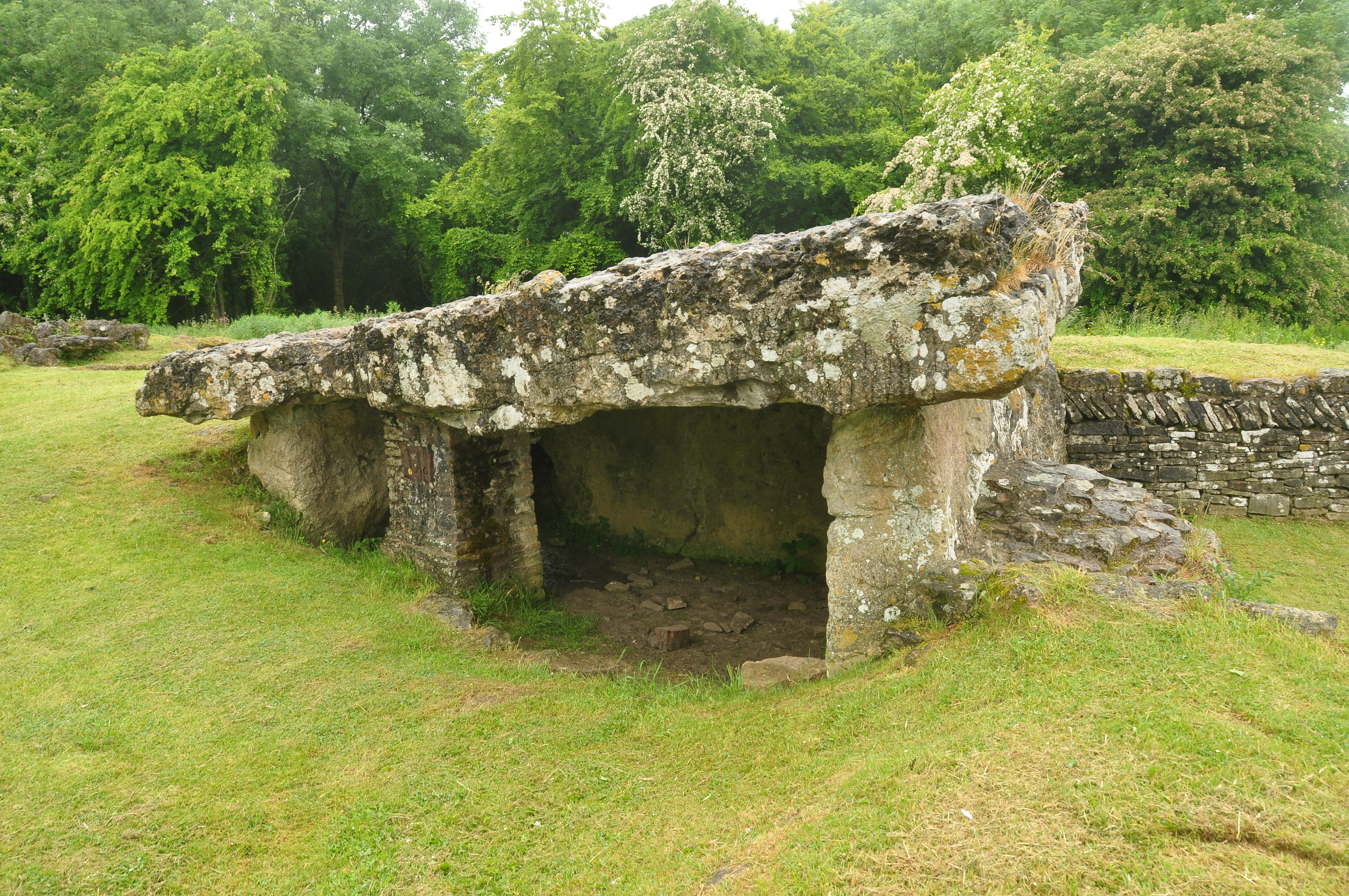

- Location of Tinkinswood in the Vale of Glamorgan and Wales
- 51°27′4.96″N 3°18′29.17″W
- Type: Dolmen
- Periods: Neolithic
- Location: St Nicholas and Duffryn Rural Communities
- Region: Vale of Glamorgan (Bro Morgannwg), Wales (Welsh: Cymru)

History
- Built: c. 4000 BC

Site notes
- Length: 7.3 m (24 ft)
- Excavation dates: 1914, 2011
- Condition: good with some damage

Scheduled monument
- Official name: Tinkinswood Burial Chamber
- Reference no.: GM009

Tinkinswood or its full name Tinkinswood Burial Chamber (Welsh: Siambr Gladdu Tinkinswood), also known as Castell Carreg, Llech-y-Filiast and Maes-y-Filiast, is a megalithic burial chamber, built around 4000 BC, during the Neolithic period, in the Vale of Glamorgan, near Cardiff, Wales.

The structure is a dolmen, which was the most common megalithic structure in Europe. The dolmen is of the Severn-Cotswold tomb type, and consists of a large capstone on top, with smaller upright stones supporting it. The limestone capstone at Tinkinswood weighs approximately 40 long tons and measures 24 feet (7.3 m) x 14 ft (4.3 m); it is thought to be the largest in Britain, and also in Europe. It would have taken some 200 people to lift the stone into the correct position. It was originally all covered by a mound of soil, which has been removed over time. The remaining mound behind the structure measures approximately 130 ft (40 m) x 59 ft (18 m) in size.

== History ==
The interior and exterior of the burial chamber
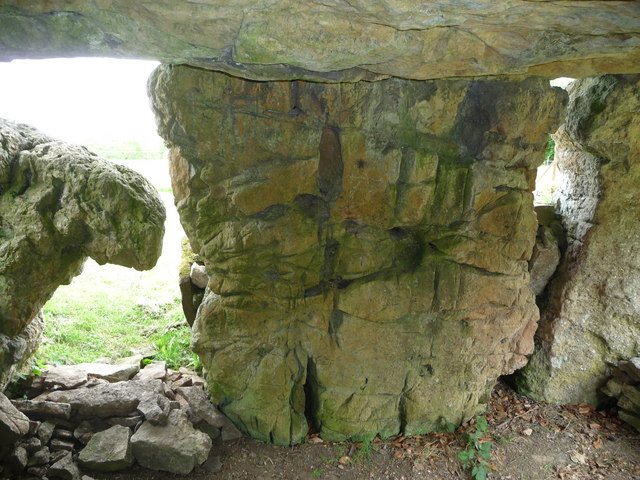
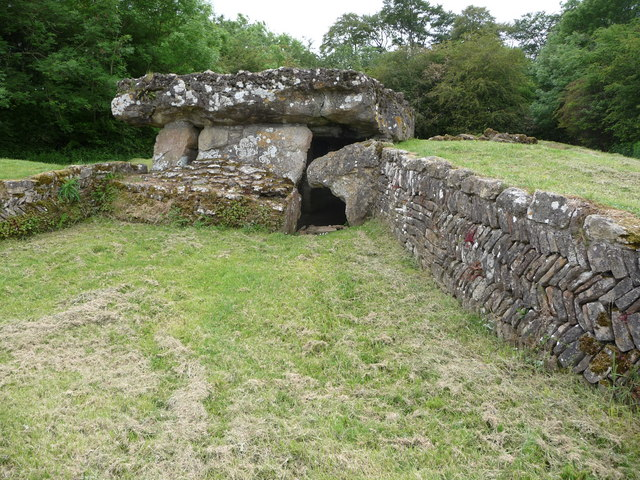
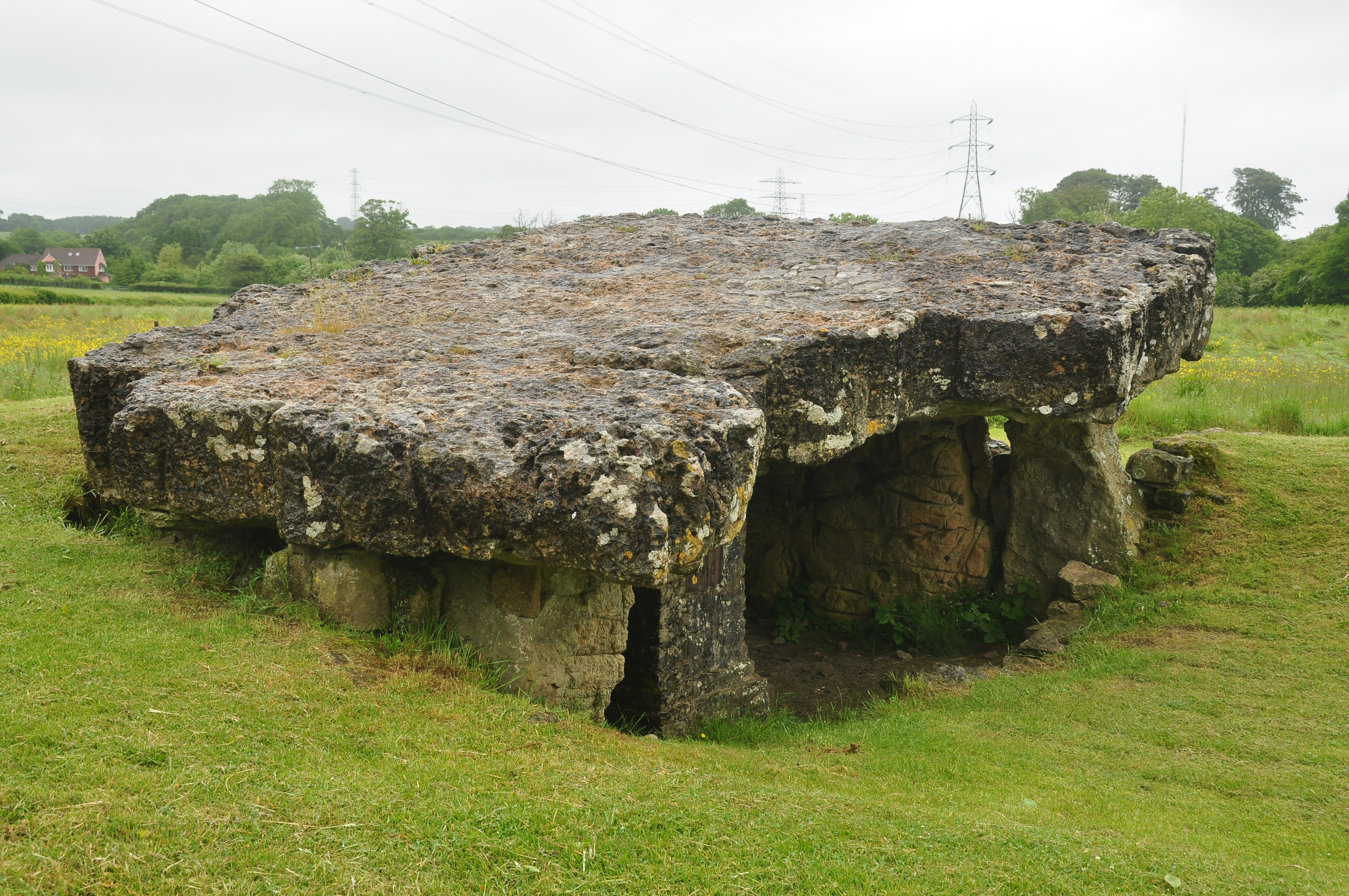

Tinkinswood was once a village but now all that remains is the burial chamber, which was built around 4000 BC, about 1,000 years or so before Stonehenge was constructed. The site was excavated in 1914, and inside the chamber there were 920 human bones, which were nearly all broken. This showed that at least forty people of all ages and sexes were buried there during the Neolithic period; it would appear to be a burial chamber used by the whole settlement. The corpses of the dead were probably left exposed before being moved into the burial chamber. Neolithic and Bell-Beaker style pottery has also been found, this showed that the burial chamber tomb was probably used by a community over a long period of time, maybe up until the early Bronze Age period. Restoration work was carried out at the same time, with a brick pillar built to support the capstone.

From the site, two parallel lines of stones form an avenue leading away from the burial chamber to the south east. Along a second avenue to the north east lie many stones. A large single stone stands due east, and two flat parallel standing stones point to the top of the nearby Coed Sion Hill.

The site is managed by Cadw, a Welsh Government body responsible for the protection, conservation and promotion of the built heritage of Wales. In October 2011, new excavations began at the site.

== Myths and legends ==
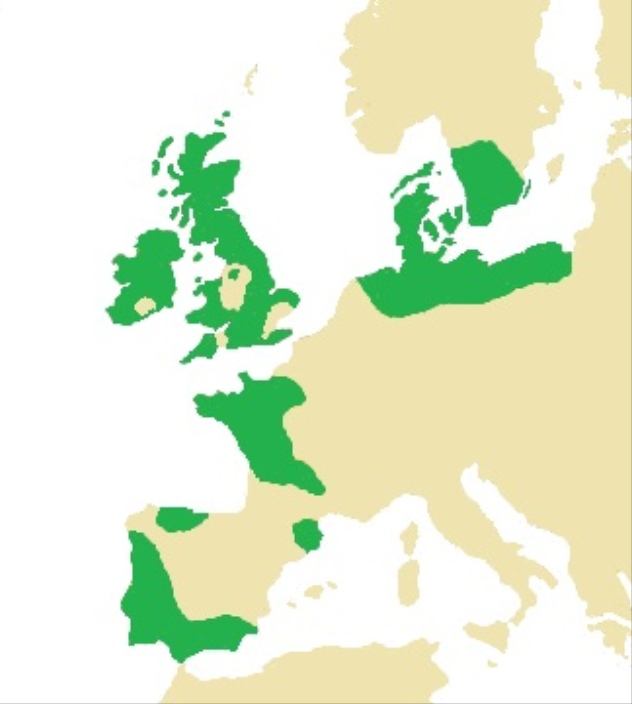
The construction of megalithic burial chamber and related funerary monuments took place in various parts of Europe during the Early Neolithic (known distribution pictured)

Many of the myths and legends of Tinkinswood are also associated with the nearby burial site of St Lythans, a short distance away. Legend has it that anyone who spends a night at Tinkinswood on the evenings before May Day, St John's Day (23 June), or Midwinter Day would either die, go mad, or become a poet. This legend is similar to the general legend about mountain tops. The group of boulders to the south east of the monument are said to be women who were turned to stone for dancing on the Sabbath day, another legend which is associated with dolmens.

== See also ==
- List of prehistoric structures in Great Britain
- List of Cadw properties
- Tumulus
- Cromlech

== Notes ==
- "Tinkinswood". Megalithic Portal.
