= All Cannings Cross =

Archaeological site in Wiltshire, England

Coordinates: 51.370°N 1.887°W

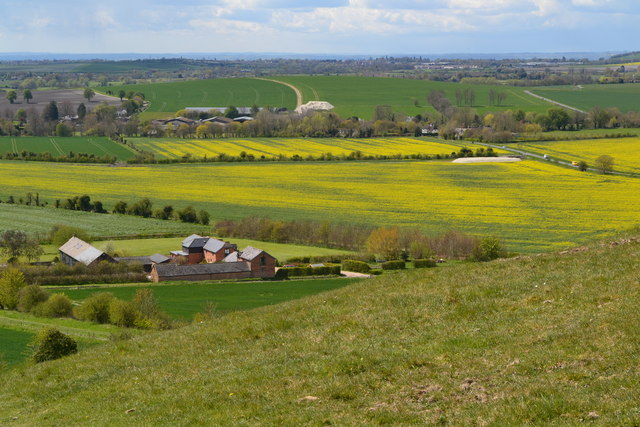
Cannings Cross Farm

All Cannings Cross is the name of farm and an archaeological site close to All Cannings, near Devizes in the English county of Wiltshire. The site is a scheduled ancient monument.

It is notable as the first site where the emergence of Iron Age technology in Britain was identified by archaeologists. In 1911 it was first investigated by Ben and Maud Cunnington after they were informed of finds of numerous hammerstones in a ploughed field in the Vale of Pewsey. Subsequent excavation by the Cunningtons encountered a thick layer of humic material containing a high concentration of pottery and animal bone as well as both bronze and iron tools. The date of the site was estimated at c. 500 BC, a time of transition from the Bronze Age to the Iron Age.

The Cunningtons returned to the site between 1920 and 1922, and study of the wide range of pottery they excavated became influential on the understanding of the period. From the eighth century to the seventh century BC, the area (Wessex) boasted an elaborate array of different vessel types, often highly decorated and well made. Some were covered with iron oxide and fired in oxidising conditions which produced pottery which could be burnished to shine like bronze vessels. This pottery, which has All Cannings Cross as its typesite, has since been found in an area of southern Britain from the Somerset Levels to eastern Hampshire. This suggests a high degree of interaction during the period and some kind of shared values which indicate that communities in the region were in close contact with another, likely through exchange networks used to trade bronze.

There is evidence for some post-built buildings and other settlement features such as hearths and floors.

More recent work by the University of Sheffield in 2003 and 2004 has interpreted the humic deposit as being part of a group of large middens, analogous to similar sites at nearby Potterne or East Chisenbury. The nature of the settlement itself is still poorly understood and it is uncertain whether the middens represent waste materials from a farming economy of whether the midden pits were perhaps ritually created through group feasting activities.

== Sources ==
- Barry Cunliffe (24 November 2014). Iron Age Britain. Pavilion Books. ISBN 978-1-84994-240-9.
