= St Nicholas, Vale of Glamorgan =

Village in Wales

Coordinates: 51.4616603°N 3.3117505°W

St Nicholas: Welsh: Sain Nicolas

- Location within the Vale of Glamorgan
- Area: 0.2450 km^{2} (0.0946 sq mi)
- Population: 654 (2021 Census)
  - Density: 2,669/km^{2} (6,910/sq mi)
  - Cardiff: 1.74 mi (2.8 km)
- Principal area: Vale of Glamorgan
- Preserved county: South Glamorgan
- Country: Wales
- Sovereign state: United Kingdom
- Post town: CARDIFF
- Postcode district: CF5
- Dialling code: 01446 and 029
- Police: South Wales
- Fire: South Wales
- Ambulance: Welsh
- UK Parliament: Vale of Glamorgan

St Nicholas (Welsh: Sain Nicolas) is a village in the Vale of Glamorgan, Wales, situated approximately 6 miles (10 km) west of Cardiff city centre and east of Cowbridge. At the 2021 census, St Nicholas had a population of 654.

The village occupies elevated ground at approximately 130 m (427 ft) above sea level on the ridge separating the River Ely valley from the agricultural landscape of the central Vale of Glamorgan. The surrounding area is characterised by gently undulating farmland, hedgerows and small areas of woodland, forming part of the Dyffryn Basin and Ridge Slopes Special Landscape Area.

The elevated position of St Nicholas provides views across parts of the Vale of Glamorgan towards Cardiff and the Bristol Channel, while the surrounding countryside retains a predominantly rural character despite the village's proximity to the western outskirts of Cardiff. The area includes a number of historic landscape features, including the Neolithic burial chamber at Tinkinswood and Dyffryn Gardens to the south.

== History ==
Evidence of human settlement in St Nicholas dates back to Neolithic times, with significant archaeological findings at Tinkinswood, located less than a mile to the south.

The modern village has evolved from an agricultural community, with land historically divided among three prominent families: the Earl of Pembroke, Miles Button of Dyffryn, and Rice Meyrick of Cottrell. This division is still reflected in the village's layout today.

During the 20th century, the village saw considerable development, particularly to the south by the Cardiff Rural District Council. The growth of Cardiff and the construction of the A4232 link road increased St Nicholas's appeal as a commuter village.

On 6 October 2016, a controversial planning application by Redrow Homes was approved, permitting the construction of 100 new homes. An additional 17 homes were later included by Waterstone Homes, with construction beginning in the summer of 2017. The development effectively doubled the village's size. That same year, the village church hall was sold.

== Amenities ==
St Nicholas has no shops or public houses. The nearest retail and other local services are located at Culverhouse Cross. The village is served by St Nicholas Church in Wales Primary School, while secondary education is provided by Cowbridge School.

The village is situated on the A48 trunk road between Cardiff and Cowbridge. It is served by the X2 bus route, which provides services eastbound to Culverhouse Cross, Canton and Cardiff city centre, and westbound to Bonvilston, Cowbridge, Bridgend and Porthcawl.

== Gallery ==
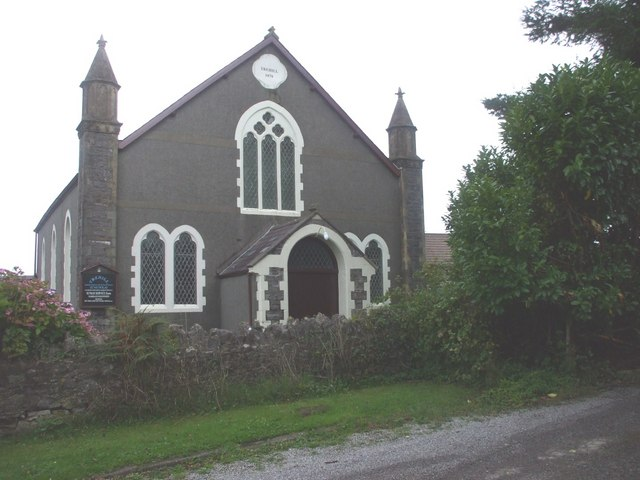
Presbyterian church

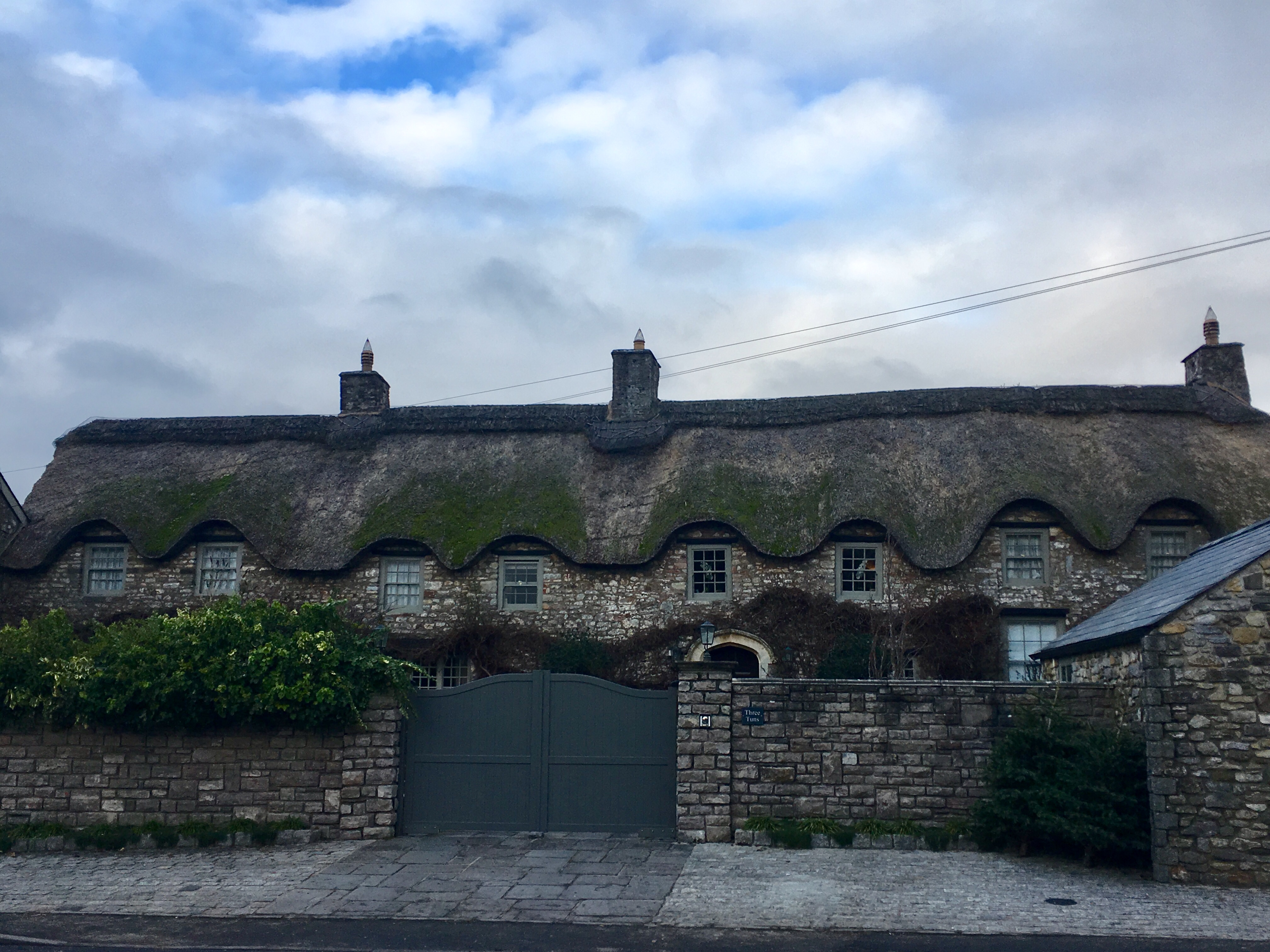
The former pub, The Three Tuns

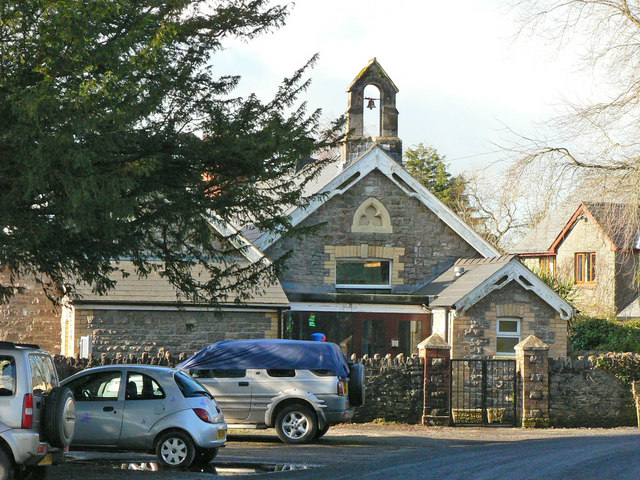
Primary school

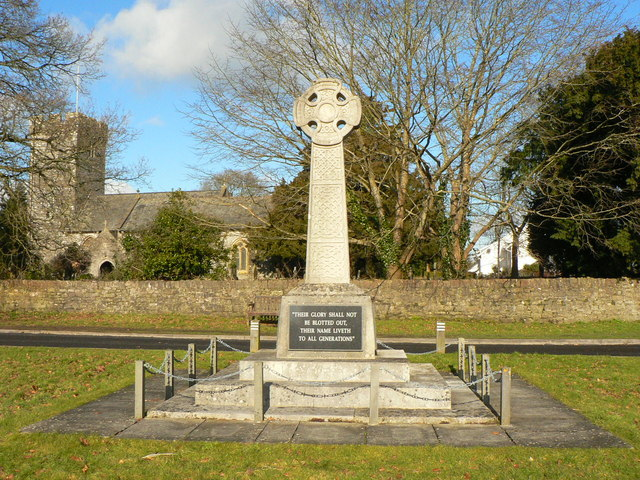
St Nicholas War Memorial

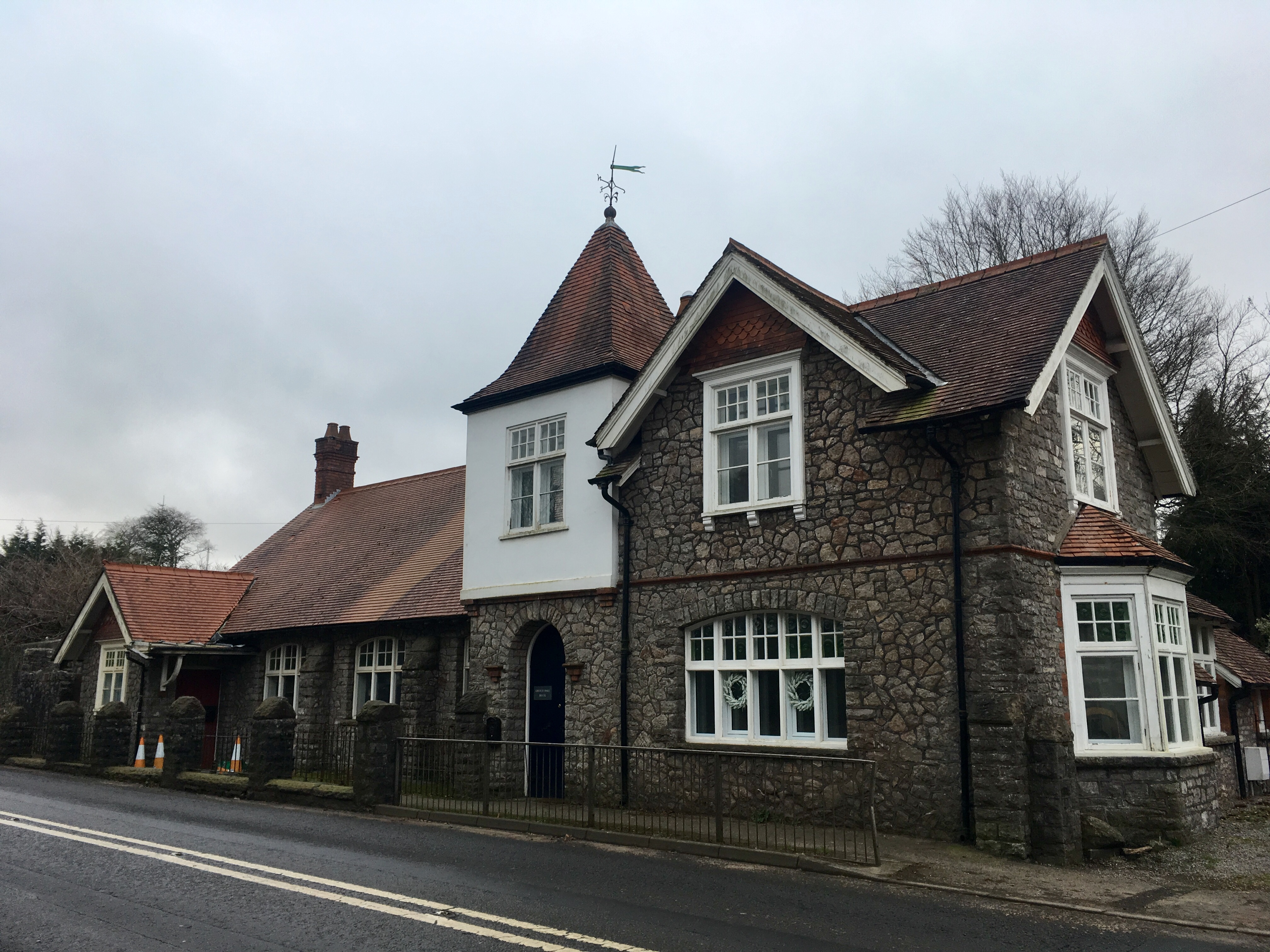
The former church hall, now Church Hall House and Tinkinswood Hall

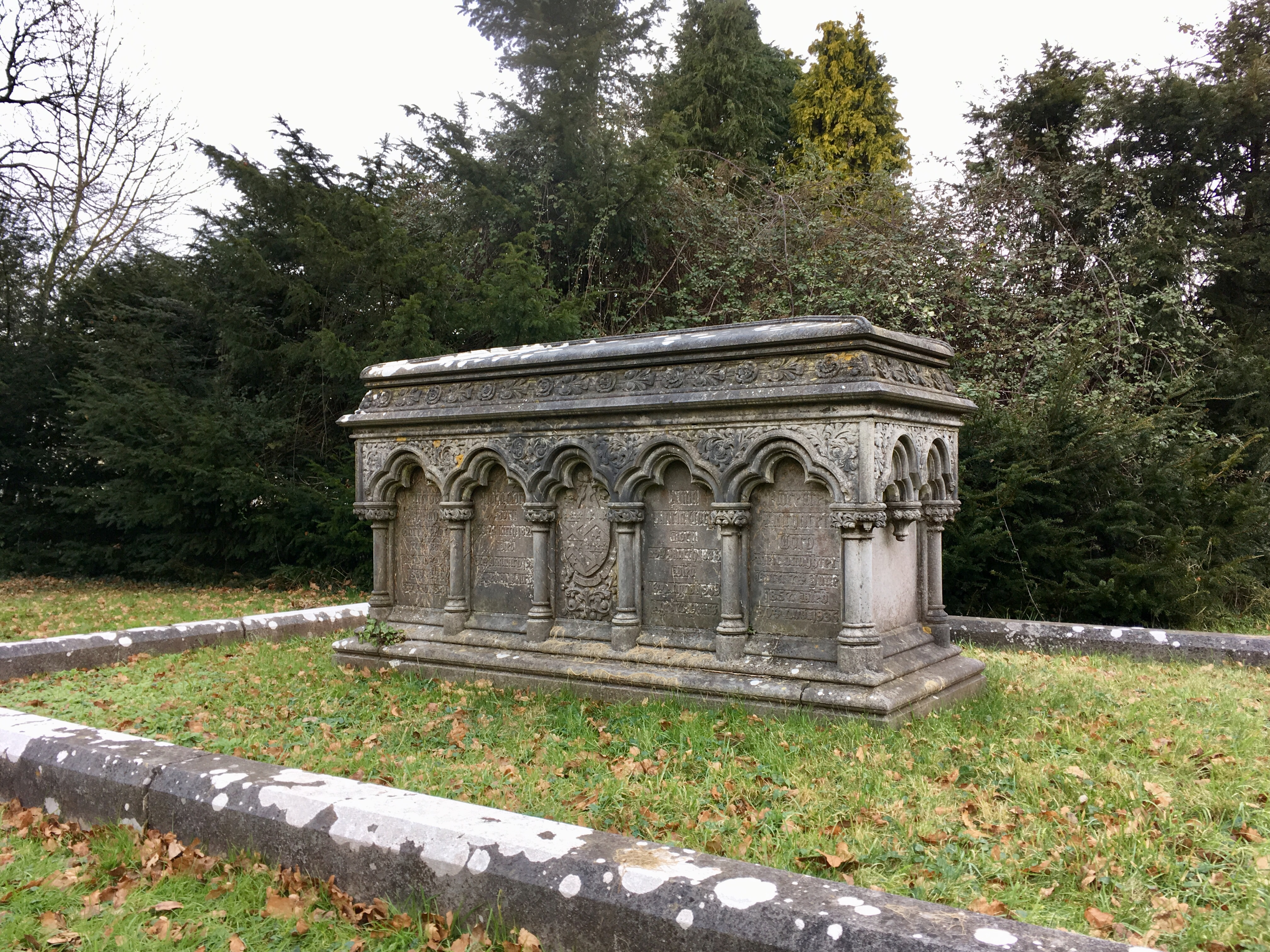
The Cory family tomb in St Nicholas churchyard

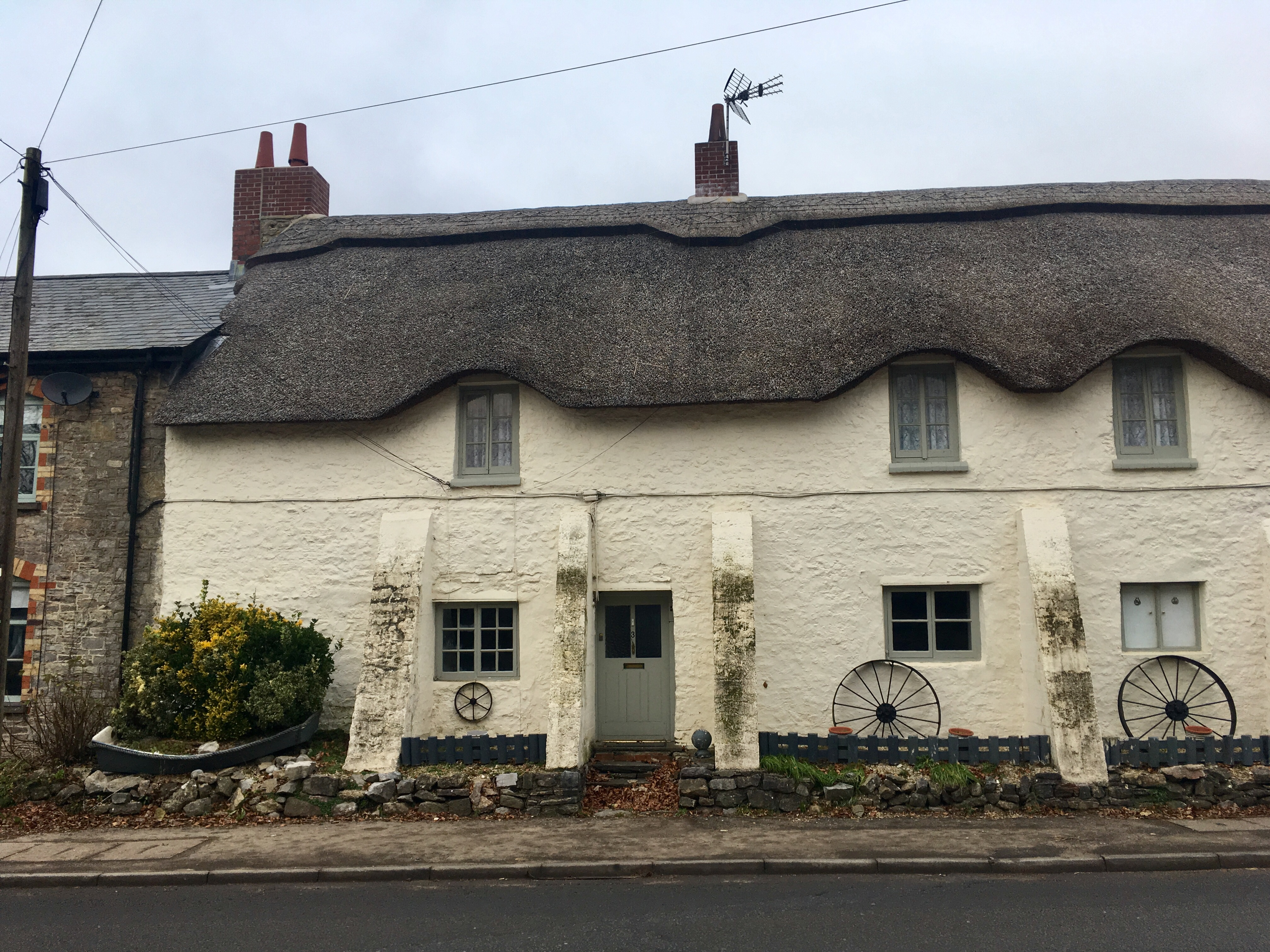
Smith's Row of thatched cottages

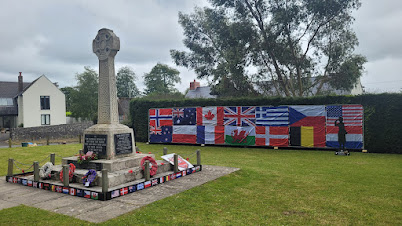
War Memorial at St Nicholas, Vale of Glamorgan, D Day 80, 2024
