= Maud Cunnington =

British archaeologist

Maud Cunnington CBE
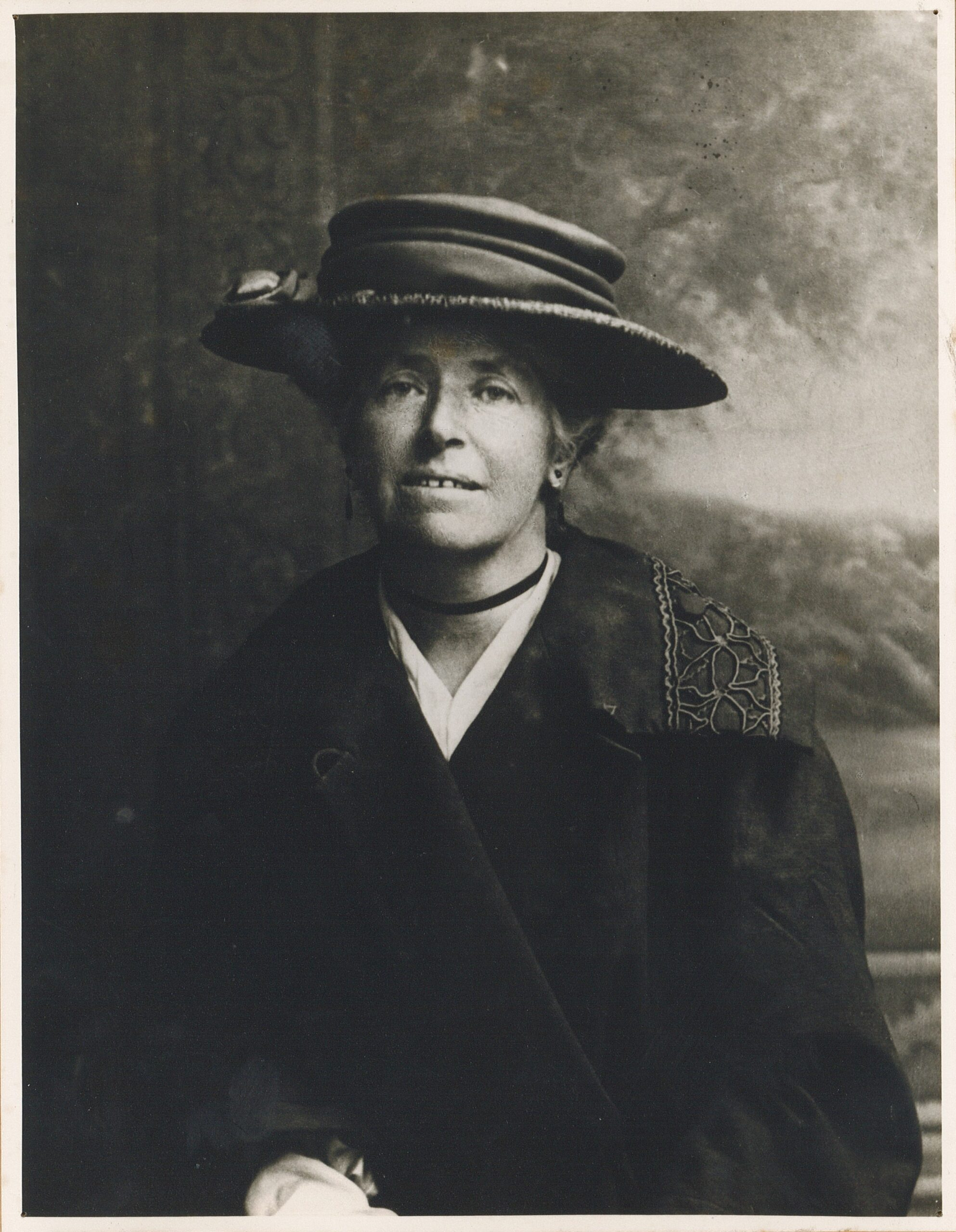
- Maud Cunnington, c. 1890s
- Born: Maud Edith Pegge; 24 September 1869; Briton Ferry, Glamorgan, Wales
- Died: 28 February 1951 (aged 81)
- Education: Cheltenham Ladies' College
- Known for: Prehistoric excavations on Salisbury Plain
- Spouse: Ben Cunnington (m. 1889; died 1950)
- Relatives: Edward Pegge (brother)

Maud Edith Cunnington CBE (née Pegge; 24 September 1869 – 28 February 1951) was a Welsh archaeologist, best known for her pioneering work on some of the most important prehistoric sites of Salisbury Plain.

== Early life, education, and marriage ==
Maud Pegge was born at Briton Ferry in Glamorgan, to Catherine Milton Leach and her husband Charles Pegge, a doctor who ran Vernon House, the last privately owned asylum in Wales. She was one of seven children. Her older brother Edward Pegge followed their father into medicine as a doctor; he was also a notable rugby player and Welsh international.

Pegge was educated briefly at Cheltenham Ladies' College. In 1889, she married Ben Cunnington. An archaeologist, he served for years as a volunteer, honorary curator of Devizes Museum. They had a son, Edward, who was killed in the First World War.

== Career ==
From 1897, Maud Cunnington carried out early rescue archaeology work during development in Wiltshire, England. Together with her husband Ben, an archaeologist, she participated in conducting full excavations in that county at some of the most important sites in British archaeology. These included the first known Neolithic causewayed enclosure at Knap Hill, the Iron Age village at All Cannings Cross, West Kennet Long Barrow, Figsbury Ring, Woodhenge (near Stonehenge), and The Sanctuary. This last monument she rediscovered, as it had been lost since William Stukeley saw it in the eighteenth century. The Cunningtons bought the sites of Woodhenge and The Sanctuary, and gave these properties to the nation.

In 1912, near Avebury, she excavated and re-erected one of the two surviving stones (the Longstones) in the Beckhampton Avenue, and one of the stones in the West Kennet Avenue.

In 1931, Cunnington was elected president of the Wiltshire Archaeological and Natural History Society, the first woman to hold that position. In addition to technical reports, she published a short handbook, Avebury: A Guide (1931). She also wrote and published a children's guide to Devizes Museum.

=== Excavations ===
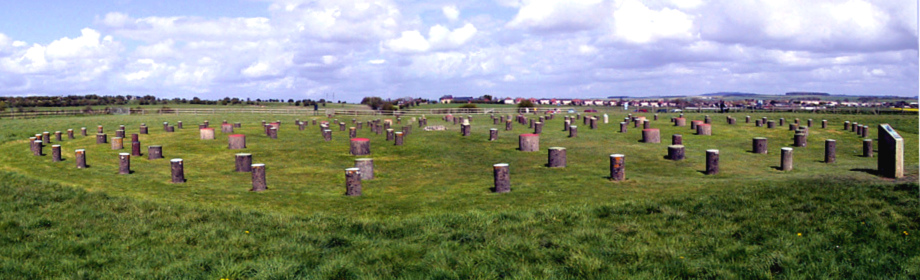
Woodhenge

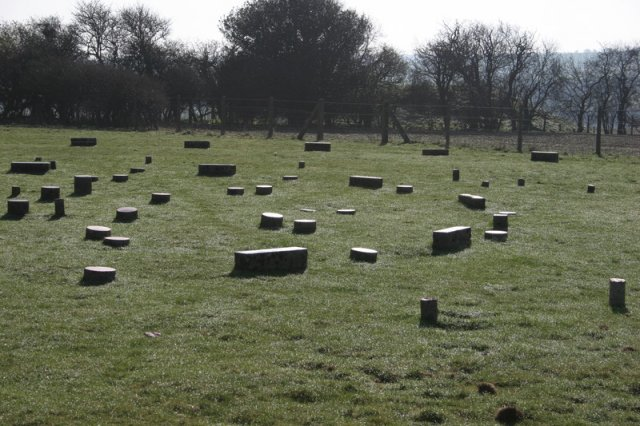
The Sanctuary, Avebury

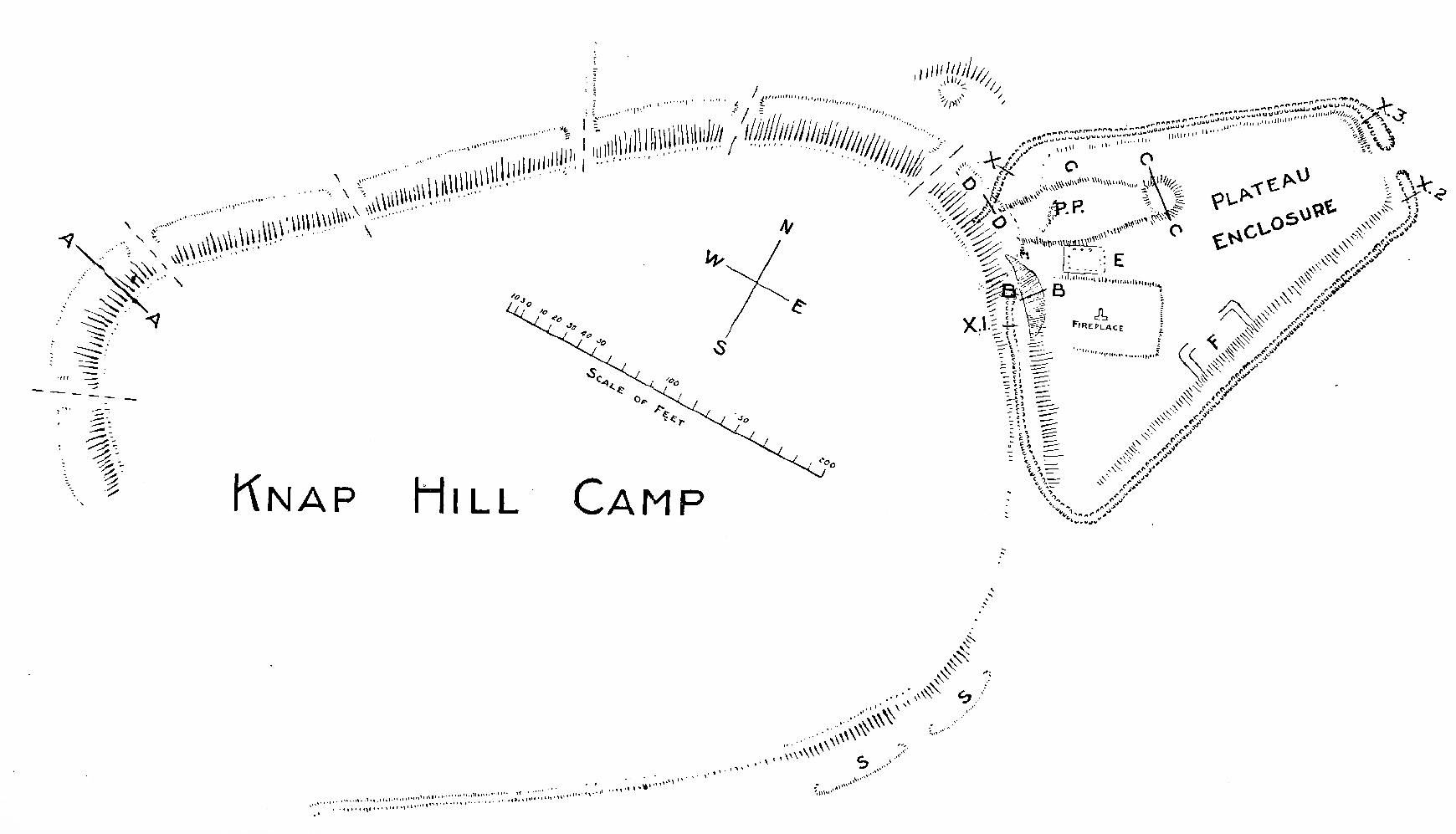
Plan of Knap Hill Camp by Cunnington, 1912

In 1912, Cunnington worked with her husband Ben to supervise the re-erection of the last standing stone at Beckhampton Cove at Avebury, which had fallen the previous year. While working at the Beckhamptom Cove site, she discovered the skeleton of a "middle-aged man" buried with a pottery beaker, dating from 2385 to 2230 BC. The same year she and her husband, working with a team, re-erected a fallen stone on West Kennet Avenue.

Cunnington excavated Woodhenge between 1926 and 1928, after a set of concentric rings darker than the surrounding turf was first observed through aerial photography in 1925. The site is approximately 60 meters (200 ft) south of Durrington Walls and 3 kilometres (1.9 mi) north east of Stonehenge. The excavation revealed six concentric rings of post-holes. The entire post-hole structure is approximately 40 meters (130 ft) in diameter, and the surrounding henge, barely visible today due to farming, was originally approximately 85 meters (279 ft) across, with a single entrance that faced Durrington Walls. Cunnington completely excavated the ditch structure of the henge, discovering large amounts of Grooved ware pottery, animal and human bones, charcoal and a stone axe that was carved from polished greenstone originating from Cornwall, approximately 290 kilometres (180 mi) away. A few shards of Beaker ware were also discovered along with antler picks, marine shells and the remnants of a flint-knapping industry.

Following the excavation of Woodhenge, in 1930 Cunnington discovered and worked on The Sanctuary site on Overton Hill at the terminus of Beckhampton Avenue near Avebury Henge. Like Woodhenge, The Sanctuary has six concentric post hole rings, although no surrounding bank and ditch structure. Cunnington discovered that the innermost ring was the oldest, based on pottery shards found in that area that were from about 2000 BC; she called this Phase I. Later, a double ring structure was built surrounding the inner ring, which she named Phase II. During the Phase III period, a larger ring 20.1 meters (66 ft) in diameter was constructed to replace the earlier rings. Grooved ware pottery was found during this aspect of the excavation, and a northwest-facing entrance to the ring was discovered. During Phase IV, the most recent phase, a 40.2-meter (132 ft) standing stone ring was built as well as in interior concentric stone circle. She found evidence that The Sanctuary was connected to Avebury Henge via the row of standing stones along West Kennet Avenue. Beaker ware pottery dating from 1600 BC was found, marked with "barbed wire" type patterning.^{[Wainwright, pg. 108]}

== Personal life and honours ==
Cunnington was named a Commander of the Order of the British Empire (CBE) in the 1948 Birthday Honours for services to archaeology, the first woman archaeologist to receive the honour. However, she had limited mobility since 1947, and had developed Alzheimer's disease, so she never knew of the accolade. When she died at home a few years later, she left almost all her property (worth £14,000) to Devizes Museum (now Wiltshire Museum). This provided for a salaried curator to be appointed for the first time. Her husband had died in 1950.
