= Dyffryn Gardens =

Collection of botanical gardens in the care of the National Trust

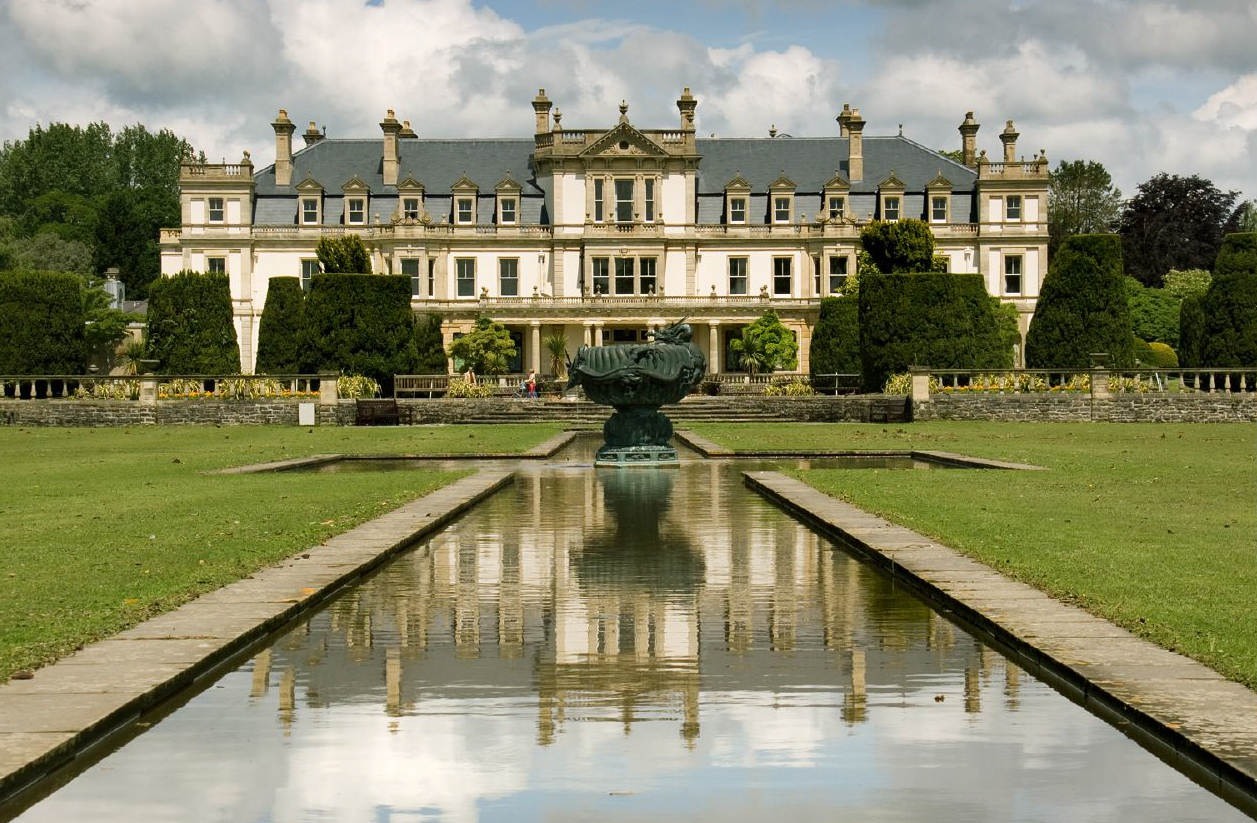
- Dyffryn House from the Great Lawn
- Interactive map of Dyffryn Gardens
- Type: Botanic garden and arboretum
- Location: Dyffryn, Vale of Glamorgan, Wales
- Coordinates: 51°26′30″N 3°18′07″W
- Area: 34 hectares (84 acres)
- Operator: National Trust
- Open: All year (363 days) Opens from 10:00, see website for details
- Website: National Trust: Dyffryn Gardens

Dyffryn Gardens
- Welsh: Gerddi Dyffryn
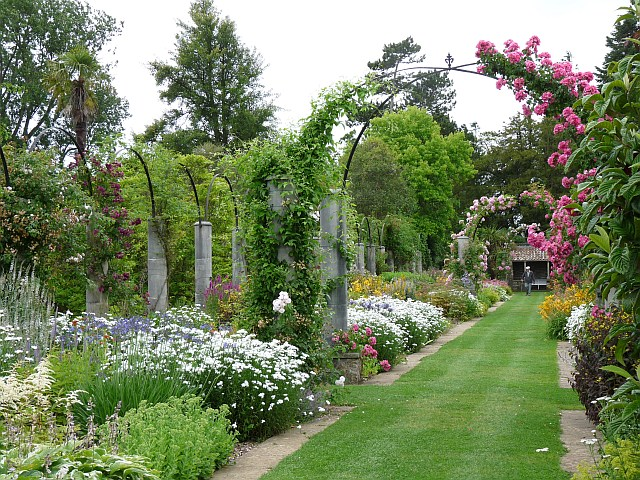
- Interactive map of Dyffryn Gardens

Listed Building – Grade II
- Official name: Lower South Terrace at Dyffryn Gardens (partly in St Nicholas and Bonvilston Community)
- Designated: 10 October 2002
- Reference no.: 26988

Dyffryn Gardens, also spelt Duffryn Gardens (Welsh: Gerddi Dyffryn), is a collection of botanical gardens located near the villages of Dyffryn and St. Nicholas in the Vale of Glamorgan, Wales. The gardens were selected by the British Tourist Authority as one of the Top 100 gardens in the UK and are in the care of the National Trust. They are designated at Grade I, the highest grade, on the Cadw/ICOMOS Register of Parks and Gardens of Special Historic Interest in Wales.

== History of the Dyffryn Estate ==
The Dyffryn Estate dates back to 640 A.D. when the Manor of Worlton (also known as Worleton), which included St Lythans and St Nicholas, was granted to Bishop Oudoceus of Llandaff.

In the 16th century the Manor of Worlton was rented under copyhold by the Button family, who are believed to have first settled at the manor at Dog Hill in Dyffryn. The family's next residence, Columbar, was thought to be built on the location of Dyffryn Gardens. The Button family occupied the estate for a number of generations, producing Admiral Thomas Button who become a notable early explorer.

The name of the Manor of Worlton was changed to the Manor of Dyffryn, St Nicholas in the 18th century when the Dyffryn Estate was sold to Thomas Pryce, who built the second building to be known as Dyffryn House, a Georgian manor, on the site in 1749.(The first house known as Dyffryn House is located in St David's Place, Goodwick and dates back to 1595.) Although no extensive work was undertaken to the grounds, Pryce did begin some additions, including the construction of the walled garden, dipping pools and some ornamental plantings.

In 1891 the Dyffryn Estate was sold to John Cory by the then owner, a banker named Henry Ellis Collins. Cory then began construction of the present house in 1893. Later, Thomas Mawson, a well-known landscape architect and first president of the Institute of Landscape Architecture, was commissioned to design a garden to complement the new house; landscaping began in 1894 and was completed in 1909.

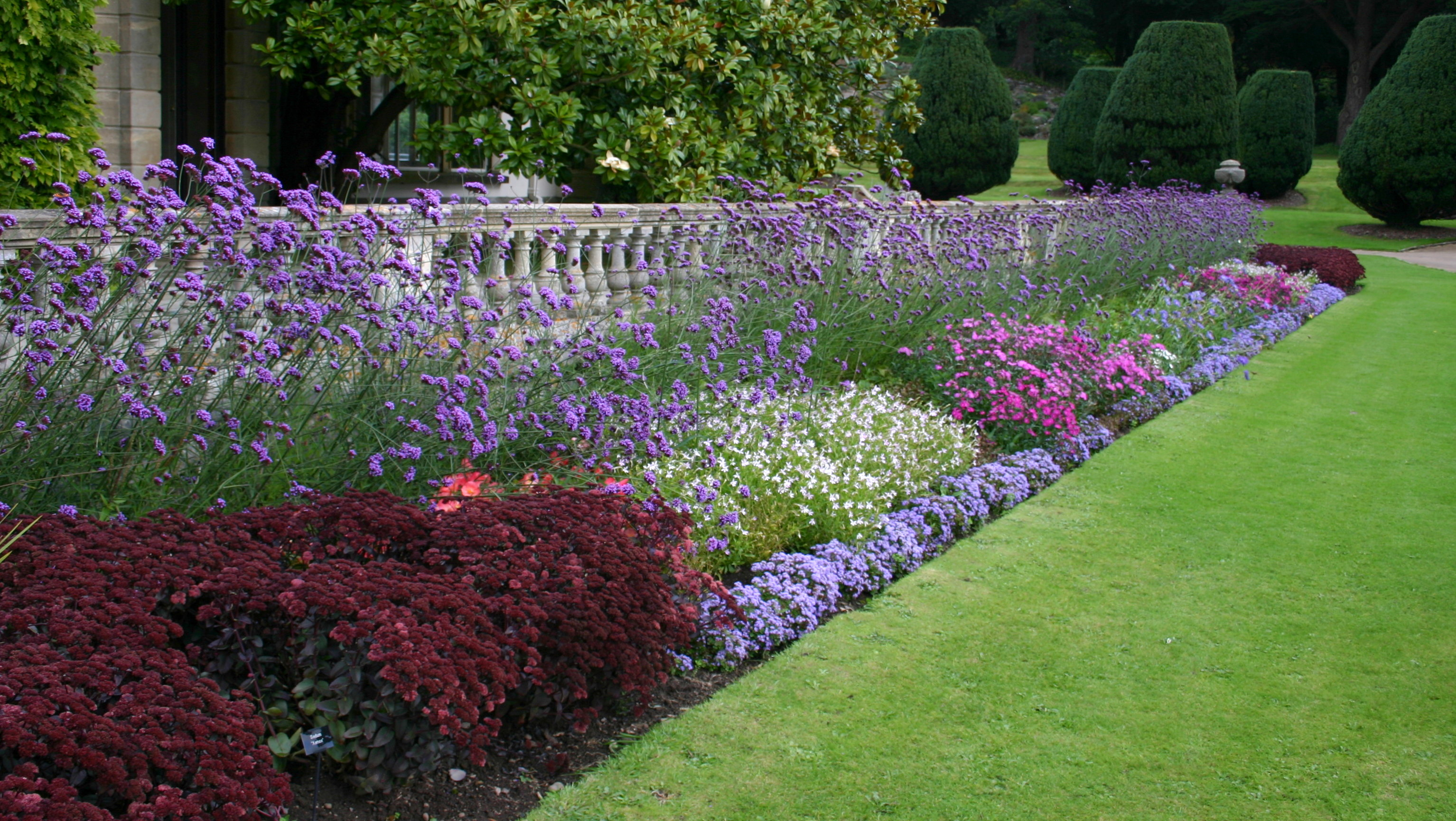
Dyffryn Gardens in 2010

After John Cory's death in 1910, the job of further developing the gardens fell to Cory's third son, Reginald, who had inherited the estate. Reginald was a leading figure in the Royal Horticultural Society and a keen horticulturalist and plant collector who during the early 1900s jointly sponsored several worldwide plant hunting expeditions. Many of the plants on display at Dyffryn exist as a direct result of these forays, the most outstanding being Acer griseum (Paper Bark Maple) grown from seed brought back from China by the famous plant hunter Ernest Wilson.

On Reginald's death in 1934, the Dyffryn Estate was passed to his sister Florence. On her death in 1937, the estate was bought by Sir Cennydd Traherne. In 1939 Sir Cennydd Traherne leased the Dyffryn House and Gardens to Glamorgan County Council, as a botanical garden on a 999-year lease. In 1973, the gardens were used as the venue to host a garden party to commemorate the dissolution of Glamorgan County Council. In 1995 Sir Cennydd Traherne died, and in 1999 his nephew Councillor Rhodri Llewellyn Traherne sold the freehold of Dyffryn House and Gardens to the Vale of Glamorgan Council for the sum of £300,000.

In 2000 Cadw awarded these gardens Grade II status in its register of landscapes, parks and gardens of special historical interest in Wales. The Grade I citation reads "The gardens at Dyffryn are the grandest and most outstanding Edwardian gardens in Wales. They are comparable to some of the most extravagant gardens of the period in Britain."

Dyffryn House and Gardens underwent restoration in 2006 with a £8 million grant, £6.15 million from the Heritage Lottery Fund, and the Grade II listed Edwardian gardens have been restored to the original design drawn up by Thomas Mawson in 1904 for the coal baron John Cory.

The National Trust took over stewardship of Dyffryn House and Gardens on a 50-year lease from the Vale of Glamorgan Council in January 2013.

== Dyffryn House ==
Dyffryn House
- Welsh: Tŷ Dyffryn
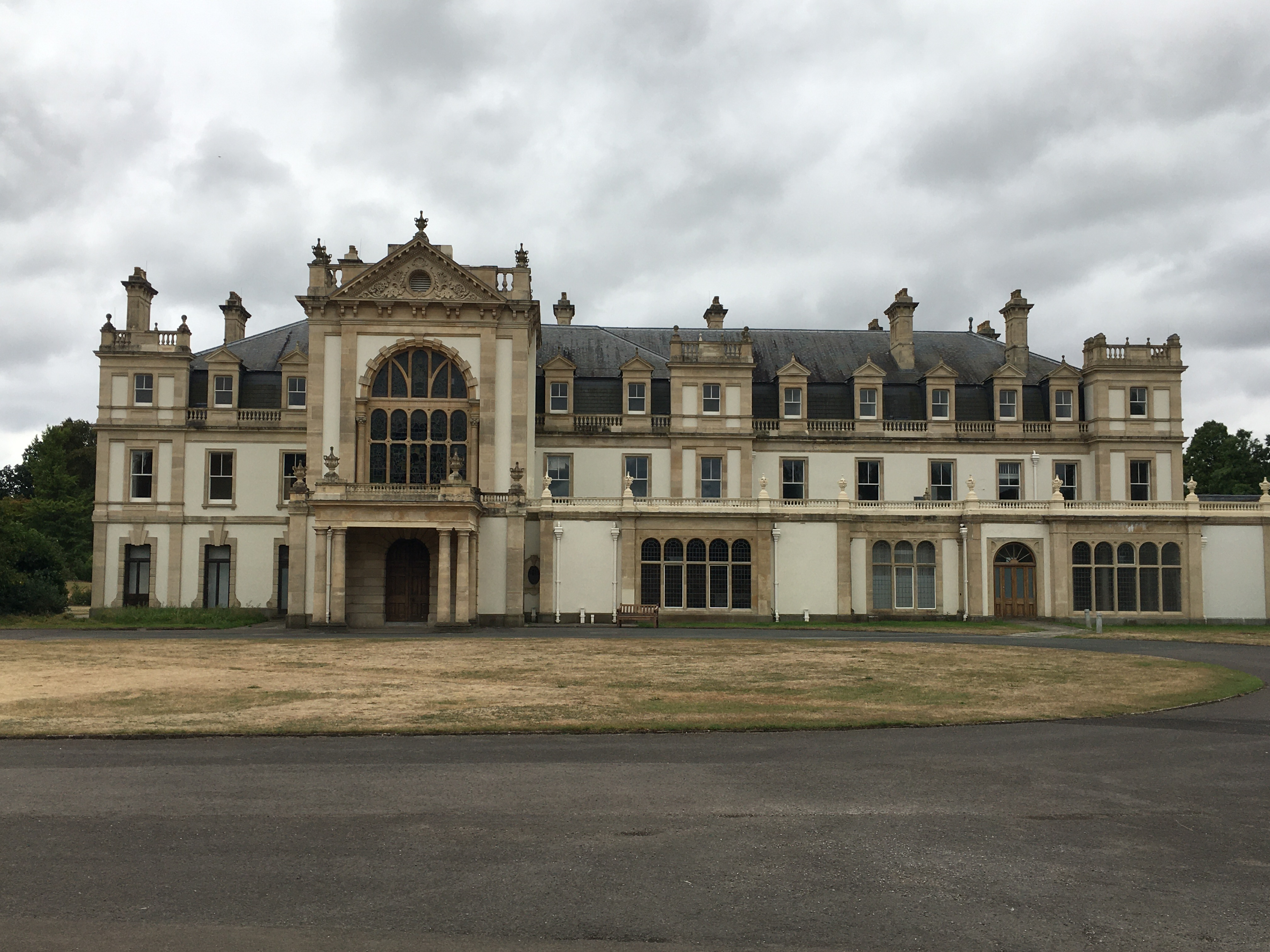
- Interactive map of Dyffryn House

Listed Building – Grade II*
- Official name: Dyffryn House
- Designated: 15 September 1992
- Reference no.: 13469

The present Dyffryn House was built in 1893–94 under the ownership of John Cory, by architect E.A. Lansdowne of Newport, and was one of the last large country manors to be built in Wales. A long narrow mansion, the architectural style is vaguely Second French Empire The main entrance, located on the north side of the building, is protected by a porte-cochere, which leads into a lofty hall. The windows looking out over the driveway from the Hall depict Elizabeth I's Speech to the Troops at Tilbury. The hall also features the most notable of the manor's impressive chimneypieces; incorporating at its centre a late 17th-century marble cartouche of arms flanked by life-size wooden Mannerist figures of Ceres and Prudence. Other rooms of note include the Oak Room, whose chimneypiece is flanked by cross-legged cherubim, each with six wings. The drawing room and boudoir have Jacobean alabaster mantle-pieces.

Despite its grand features, the house was used as a police training centre, and up until 1996 a conference centre. In 2007, the Vale of Glamorgan Council appointed £1.4 million to repair and maintain Dyffryn House's walls and roof. As of 2012 the house is being extensively restored and was opened to the public in March 2013.

Today, Dyffryn Gardens is a visitor attraction open all year round, 363 days a year. The gardens are accessed via the admissions building, which also houses a shop and an attached tea-room. From here the gardens are divided into three main areas, the arboretum, Dyffryn House and its lawns and the Garden Rooms.

The eastern and largest section of the gardens contains the arboretum that begins with the kennel bank, leading to the rockery. The central section, which divides the arboretum in the east from the Garden Rooms to the west, contains Dyffryn House and its lawns, beginning with the house to the north extending southwards to the Vine Walk, a series of arches each containing a different species of vine. The two main lawns include the croquet lawn, closest to Dyffryn House, which runs east to west parallel to the main building, and the Great Lawn. The Great Lawn runs north–south and at its centre a longitudinal canal, which has at its centre a large bronze fountain. The fountain is in Chinese style and has a bronze Chinese Dragon wrapped around it; thought to be from the 1950s. The Great Lawn ends with a fountain pool, for which there is currently a fundraising drive to repair. The two bronze statues, Fujin and Raijin, Japanese Shinto gods of wind and lightning, that used to be here are now housed in the glass houses. At the southern end of the lawns is the Vine Walk, and Lavender Garden, the latter containing a red brick folly.

The final section of the gardens contains the Garden Rooms, a series of terraced themed gardens. The "rooms" contain an Italian Terrace, Australasian and Mediterranean Gardens, each containing plants from their respective regions. Other areas include a physic garden, rose garden, reflecting pool and Pompeian gardens. The Pompeiian gardens, entered via an archway dated 1909, were originally inspired by Reginald Cory's trips to Italy.

Throughout the gardens are statues, many with a motif of people with animals. These include a life-size prone stone lion, a terracotta statue of a palm-bearing female, signed "E. Kuhse", (1881) of German origin and to the rear of the house outside the visitor centre is a large bronze of a mandarin riding a bull.

== Use as a Filming Location ==
The estate was used in 2009 as the primary filming location for The Sarah Jane Adventures episode "The Eternity Trap." The estate has also been used for the Doctor Who episodes "The Girl Who Waited" and "Deep Breath", the latter of which was used for a scene featuring Michelle Gomez. The house and gardens can also be seen in the Torchwood episode "Something Borrowed" as the location of Gwen & Rhys' wedding. More recently, the garden can be seen in the 4th episode of the 2026 programme The Other Bennet Sister which is based on the novel by Janice Hadlow.

== See also ==
- List of gardens in Wales

== Biography ==
- Davies, John; Jenkins, Nigel (2008). The Welsh Academy Encyclopaedia of Wales. Cardiff: University of Wales Press. ISBN 978-0-7083-1953-6.
- Evans, C.J.O. (1948). Glamorgan, its History and Topography. Cardiff: William Lewis.
- Lloyd, John Edward; Jenkins, R.T. (1958). The Dictionary of Welsh Biography, Down to 1940. Cardiff: William Lewis.
- Newman, John (1995). Glamorgan. London: Penguin Group. ISBN 0-14-071056-6.
