= Bead-rim pottery =

Bead-rim pottery refers to the presence of a rounded molding on the lip of a jar, bowl, or dish, both to add strength and assist in handling.
