= Ben Cunnington (archaeologist) =

British archaeologist (1861–1950)

Edward Benjamin Howard Cunnington (1861–1950), was a British archaeologist most famous for his work on prehistoric sites and features in Wiltshire, England. He was the great-grandson of the famous antiquarian William Cunnington, and the fourth generation of his family to work recording and preserving Wiltshire's past.

The son of Henry Cunnington, a wine merchant, and his wife, Benjamin worked as a journalist before joining his father's business. For sixty years he served as the unpaid honorary curator of Devizes Museum.

In 1889, he married Maud Pegge. They had one son, Edward, who was killed in the First World War.

The couple devoted their lives to archaeology in Wiltshire, carrying out formal excavations at highly significant sites. The Cunningtons carried out excavations at some of the most important sites in British archaeology. These included the first known Neolithic causewayed enclosure at Knap Hill, the Iron Age village at All Cannings Cross, West Kennet Long Barrow, Woodhenge, (which they named) and The Sanctuary. This last monument they rediscovered, as it had been lost since William Stukeley saw it in the eighteenth century. The Cunningtons bought the properties underlying Woodhenge and The Sanctuary, and donated the sites and features to the nation.

Cunnington died in 1950; his wife Maud died in 1951.

== Sources ==
- Rundle, P. Cunnington, Maud Edith (1869-1951), Oxford Dictionary of National Biography, Oxford University Press, 2004 accessed 23 September 2005
