= Cove (standing stones) =

Tight rectangular group of stones

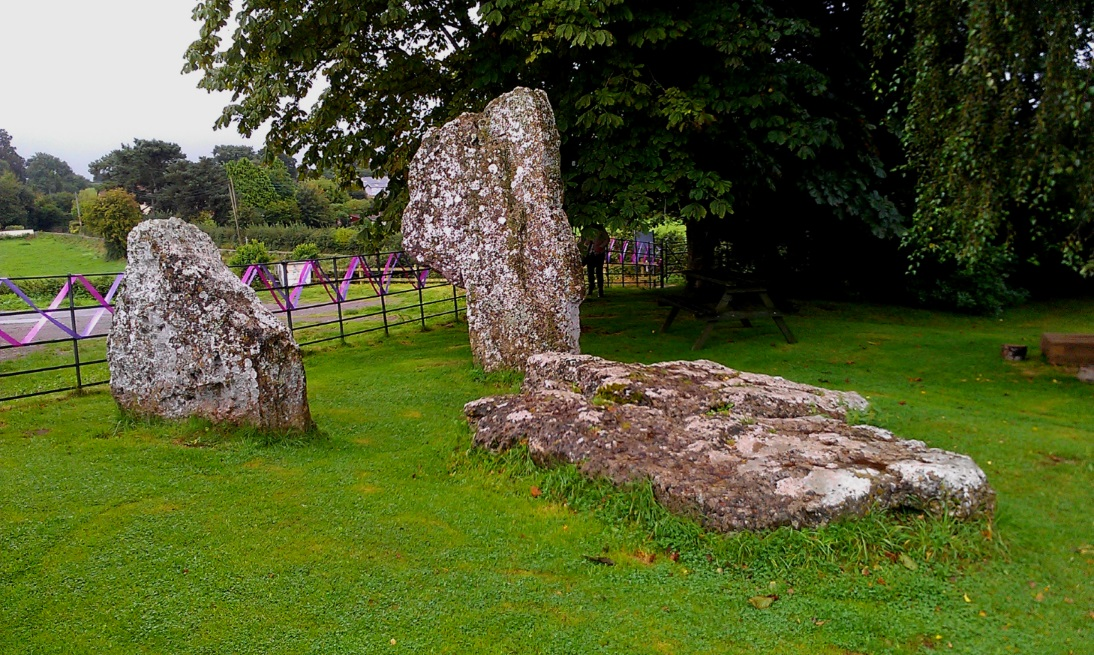
The cove at Stanton Drew

A cove is a tightly concentrated group of large standing stones found in Neolithic and Bronze Age England. Coves are square or rectangular in plan and seem to have served as small enclosures within other henge, stone circle or avenue features. They consist of three or four orthostats placed together to give the impression of a box. An opening between the stones, oriented southeast, is also a feature.

They may have developed from the elaborate facades that fronted Neolithic long barrows, although their original function is unknown.

Examples include:

- The Longstones in Wiltshire;
- The cove at Avebury Henge in Wiltshire;
- The cove at Stanton Drew in Somerset and
- The cove at Mount Pleasant henge in Dorset

== See also ==
- Dolmen
- Megalithic architectural elements
- Menhir
