= Joan Semmel =

American feminist painter, professor emeritus (born 1932)

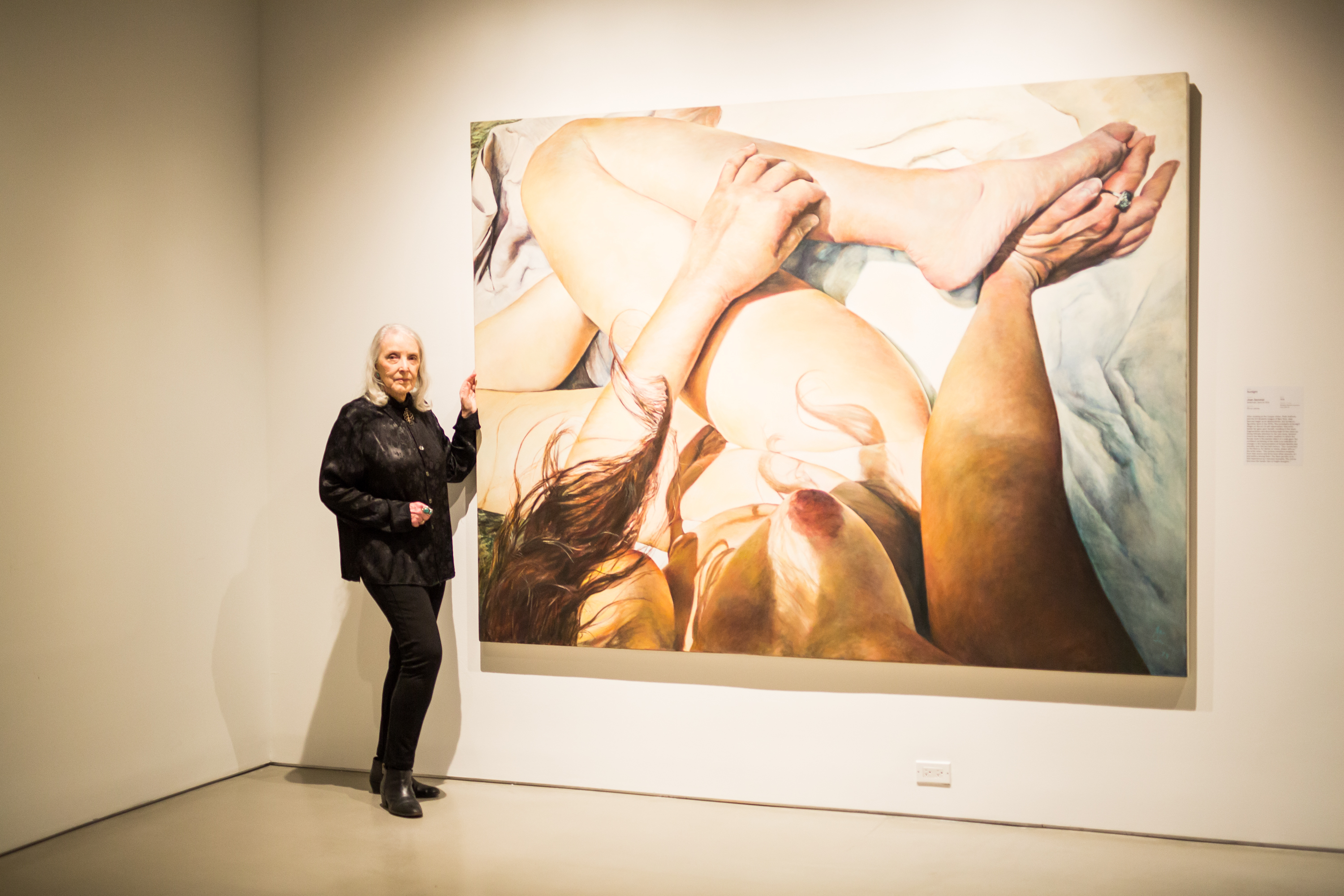
- Semmel at the Jewish Museum in front of her painting Sunlight 1978 in Scenes from the Collection
- Born: October 19, 1932; New York City, NY, U.S.
- Known for: Painting
- Movement: Figurative art, Feminist Art, Second-wave feminism

Joan Semmel (born October 19, 1932) is an American feminist painter and professor emeritus in painting. She is best known for her large-scale naturalistic nude self portraits as seen from her perspective looking down.

== Education and political involvement ==
Semmel was born in New York City. She grew up in the Bronx and began her artistic training at Cooper Union, where she studied under Nicholas Marsicano. She went on to study with Morris Kantor at the Art Students League of New York before earning a BFA from the Pratt Institute in 1963.

She spent seven and a half years in Spain (1963–1970), where her work, "gradually developed from broad gestural and spatially referenced painting to compositions of a somewhat surreal figure/ground composition...(her) highly saturated brilliant color separated (her) paintings from the leading Spanish artists whose work was darker, grayer and Goyaesque." Semmel returned to New York City in 1970 and earned an MFA from the Pratt Institute in 1972. Upon returning to New York in 1970, Semmel was shocked by the number of sexualized images of women she saw on American newsstands. She began to paint in a figurative style, and incorporated the erotic themes for which she is known today. Her MFA thesis show at Pratt consisted of paintings from the First Erotic Series. Although Semmel's mother was comfortable talking about her own sexuality, seeing her daughter's paintings of sexual scenes was difficult for her because she still kept a kosher home and had a traditional notion of modesty.

In New York, Semmel became involved in the feminist movement and feminist art groups devoted to gender equality in the art world. She has been a member of the Ad Hoc Committee of Women Artists, the Fight Censorship (FC) group, Women in the Arts (WIA), and the Art Workers Coalition (AWC). The Women's Caucus for Art honored Semmel as a 2013 recipient of the organization's Lifetime Achievement Award. During a 2015 panel discussion titled "Painting and the Legacy of Feminism" at Maccarone Gallery, Semmel stated "I would like to get away from the basic declaration of why there are no great women artists. There are great women artists. There are many great women artists. And we shouldn't still be talking about why there are no great women artists. If there aren’t great celebrated women artists, that's because we have not been celebrating them, but not because they are not there."

As of 2013, Semmel is Professor Emeritus of Painting at Rutgers University. Her work was included in the 2024 exhibition Making Their Mark: Works from the Shah Garg Collection at the Berkeley Art Museum and Pacific Film Archive (BAMPFA).

== Work ==
About major themes in her work, Semmel states, "While my work developed through series, the connecting thread across decades is a single perspective: being inside the experience of femaleness and taking possession of it culturally." Though Semmel has created many different series throughout her career, the majority of her oeuvre features themes of sexuality, the body, intimacy and self-exploration both physically and psychologically.

=== First Erotic Series (1970–71) ===
The First Erotic Series depicts heterosexual couples having sex. The subject matter is explicitly erotic, but the compositions give a nod to abstraction with expressive, unnatural colors and a strong emphasis on individual forms. These large scale depictions of sexual activities reclaimed the gaze of the female nude, which heralded an unprecedented approach to painting and representation in the 1970s.

=== Second Erotic Series (1972–73) ===
Referred to by Semmel as "fuck paintings," the Second Erotic Series paintings are sharp and realistic but retain the intense, unnatural colors of the First Erotic Series. The paintings are based on photographs of a man and woman having sex, which Semmel took over several sessions with the couple's consent. When no commercial gallery in New York would show the series, Semmel rented space in SoHo and exhibited the work herself, attracting attention from critics. Semmel refused requests by Penthouse and Playboy to publish work from the series. Erotic Yellow (1973) was used without her permission in the “Hot Erotic Art” issue of Screw magazine (May 1974).

==== Possible interpretations of the Erotic Series ====
Semmel had a fascination with the human body and included it within her art pieces in a sensual form. But, unlike her male chauvinist counterparts, she believed that women should be represented as individuals, without stereotyping females as a whole. Semmel asks us to distinguish between an individual who is "naked" and one who is "nude". “To be naked is to be oneself. To be nude is to be seen naked by others and yet not recognized for oneself. A naked body has to be seen as an object in order to become a nude. (The sight of it as an object stimulates the use of it as an object.) Nakedness reveals itself. Nudity is placed on display. To be naked is to be without disguise” Semmel recognizes that women have been tainted not by the fact of their nudity within paintings, but rather from the fact of the male viewer who interprets them as nothing but naked. Semmel has been quoted saying, “I am always asked the question about my feelings of being publicly naked, and I always answer: It isn't me, it's the painting.”

By making most of the individuals in her paintings anonymous and keeping their faces hidden Semmel is asking the viewer to consider the whole concept of nudity opposed to being naked. This focuses the work on sexual connection itself and the nature of sexual interaction in general rather than the relating of two specific individuals.

=== Self-portraits ===
During the summer of 1973, while teaching at the Maryland Art Institute in Baltimore, Semmel began painting what she calls “the idea of myself as I experience myself, my own view of myself.” The self-portraits such as Me Without Mirrors (1974) include the artist's body from about the collar bone to the feet and do not include her face. Source photographs for the large-scale paintings were taken by the artist, or in some cases by a friend “as close as possible to the artist's viewpoint.” Several self-portraits such as Intimacy and Autonomy (1974) include a male partner. In these paintings, “the nude no longer appears as an idealized fantasy, allegorical figure, or landscape of desire but rather as the self-apprehended body of a specific woman.”

==== Relating Semmel's Self-Portraits to Society (Interpretation) ====
Semmel is interested in portraying the real human body, challenging the notion of what an “attractive female” is within society. She uses herself and other females to depict the reality of how age, weight, and the overall transitioning body are universal to all women. Semmel's point is that these changes are not the destruction of beauty, and that in fact what is beautiful is subjective and malleable. Semmel constantly references identity and has stated: "The artist's constant search for self merges with the woman's need for self-definition."

=== Semmel on Feminist Art ===
In 1976 Feminist Artists Ruth Iskin, Lucy Lippard, and Arlene Raven sent Joan Semmel an invitation to respond to the question, "What is Feminist Art". In her letter, she defines feminist art as, "art which in some way, however varied, validates the female experience. In this society that experience is still very different than males. The validation of female experience in this culture is a primary feminist goal and any art which does so is, for me, Feminist Art." She also describes Feminist Art as being more relevant, as more women seek to define themselves. She describes a struggle of being a feminist activist but not wanting that to define one's art; that art should neither be described as "male" or "female". Her letter is now housed in the Woman's Building records in Los Angeles.

=== Return to the figure (1970–1978) ===
On her return to New York from Spain in 1970, she turned from abstraction towards figuration, producing works which responded to her involvement with the burgeoning women's movement. A staunch advocate for women's rights, Semmel attended meetings at the Ad Hoc Women Artists' Committee and joined artists including Judy Chicago (born 1939), Miriam Schapiro (1923–2015), Nancy Spero (1926–2009) and Louise Bourgeois (1911–2010), who had all begun to use the female body in their work. Joan was quoted on the topic; "My return to the figure in 1970, from an Abstract Expressionist background, was prompted by a need to work from a more personal viewpoint, and was charged by my then-emerging consciousness as a feminist."

=== Echoing Images (1979–81) ===
Semmel describes this series, which was exhibited at Lerner Heller Gallery: "the main compositional figure is repeated twice: once in a realist style and a second much larger highly expressionistic version. They are almost like internal and external views of the self that combine a perceptual image with the ambition and striving of the emotive ego."

=== Beach series (1985–1986) ===
Since 1971, Semmel has spent her summers in East Hampton, NY. The Beach series (1985–87) of paintings were made in her East Hampton studio. In 1987 she bought a house and established a permanent studio in Springs, East Hampton, where she continues to work every summer. Unlike many of her works, which isolate figures against expressive grounds of color, in these works, Semmel positions bodies in a landscape. This new way of working was characteristic of Semmel's painterly approach in the 1980s, which was a decade when she began to push her practice in new directions. Writing about this period, Semmel stated, “I combined realist and painterly methods insisting that a unified style was not preordained.” With this series, she aimed to communicate the psychological experience of feeling lost in a crowd – alone and isolated even on a crowded beach.

=== Locker Room series (late 1980s) ===
Beginning with Mirror Mirror (1988), Semmel depicts the camera as a "device to frame and question issues of perception and representation." Semmel took photographs in women's locker rooms, using the mirror and the camera "as strategies to destabilize the point of view (who is looking at whom) and to engage the viewer as a participant. "My paintings revealed a body at a more advanced age, and showed me aggressively pointing the camera at the viewer."

=== Overlays series (1992–1996) ===
The Overlays series (1992–96), combines conceptual and formal concerns that echo many of Semmel's previous investigations. For this body of work, she used pre-existing paintings from her Erotic Series (1972) as the backgrounds for gestural images of nude, middle-aged female bodies taken from her prior Locker-Room paintings (1988–91). These works represent a fertile moment of formal experimentation as Semmel began exploring color and transparency – compositional elements that she continued to refine in her later work. Writing about this series, she observes, “both non-naturalistic color and linear overlays of complementary or contrasting images, again recall abstract elements, but also provoke a suggestion of time, motion, or memory.”

=== Mannequins (1996–2001) ===
Inspired by old mannequins she found on the street, Semmel worked with these "idealized versions of the female body...as alter egos to explore the isolation and anomie of objectification and fetishization."

=== With Camera (2001–2006) ===
The first time Semmel purposefully poses in front of a mirror with the camera.

=== Shifting Images (2006–2013) ===
In Shifting Images, Joan Semmel paints her body in motion. Layered and blurred compositions, these works suggest instability, movement, and the passage of time; in Semmel's words, “[they] seem to reference the anxious moments of personal lives, as well as … visualize the inevitability of aging.” Ultimately, reflecting on this and other recent series, Semmel expands, “In a culture so driven by youth, but due to suddenly be overtaken by the baby boomer generation in old age, it seems essential to address our expectations and priorities. If we are lucky we will be old some day. Age cannot be denied as part of the human spectrum. My work … has tried to acknowledge and address some of these feelings for myself and others.”

=== Heads (2007–2013) ===
Semmel's Heads (2007–13) feature self-portraits of the artist. Unlike her previous self-images, in these works she paints just her face. Intimate in scale and rendered in a variety of styles, these paintings adopt both the realism of her earlier With Camera works (2001–06), as well as the blurring of Shifting Images compositions (2006–13). In an interview, Semmel elaborated on her decision to begin to paint the Heads. “The way I started doing the heads was by taking those pictures in the mirror, and even though I didn’t usually use the heads I got it in the mirror because I’d hold the camera at waist level. Not always, but sometimes, so I got the face. Then I would take the heads off that picture – I didn’t shoot for the head, but I like the head that I got.”

=== Transparencies (2014–ongoing) ===
Joan Semmel continues to meditate on the aging female physique. Recalling Semmel's 1990s Overlays series, many of these works feature silhouettes of her body superimposed over realistic renderings of her form. Interacting with one another, these dual images create what the artist describes as “dialogues … [which] entice the viewer to engage.” At the same time, through layered compositions that suggest movement and the passage of time, these paintings advance Semmel's decades-long engagement with chronicling her aging body.

=== Ongoing ===
Semmel has continued to paint nude self-portraits in the 2000s and 2010s. These self-portraits employ a different perspective, one seen in a mirror and including the camera and the reflection of its flash. Her most recent work explores the physical and psychological experiences associated with aging while continuing to be self-referential and engaging in her paintings. These meditations on the aging female physique are experimental in representation, expanding beyond conventional realism. Her self portraits are doubled, in motion and fragmented, perhaps explorations of a metaphysical state of being and a close tie between the body and the mind. Challenging the patriarchal gaze of an objectified nude female body, Semmel's work dissolves the typically clearly demarcated lines between artist and model, viewer and subject In 2021 the Pennsylvania Academy of the Fine Arts held a retrospective entitled Joan Semmel: Skin in the Game. Semmel's work was included in the 2022 exhibition Women Painting Women at the Modern Art Museum of Fort Worth. The Jewish Museum, New York, exhibited her work in their 2025 exhibition, Joan Semmel: In the Flesh.

== Museum collections ==
Semmel's works are found in museum collections including: the Museum of Fine Arts, Houston; the Blanton Museum of Art, Austin, TX; Chrysler Museum of Art, Norfolk, VA; the Jewish Museum and the Brooklyn Museum, New York.

== Awards ==
Semmel's awards include the Women's Caucus for Art Lifetime Achievement Award (2013), the Anonymous Was A Woman Award (2007), National Academician of the National Academy Museum, New York (2014) the Richard Florsheim Art Fund Grant (1996), Distinguished Alumnus Award, Cooper Union (1985), Yaddo Residency (1980), Macdowell Colony Residency (1977), and National Endowment for the Arts grants (1980, 1985).

== Personal life ==
Semmel lives and works in the SoHo neighborhood of New York City.
