= Windmill Hill culture =

Archaeological culture in England

The Windmill Hill culture was a name given to a people inhabiting southern Britain, in particular in the Salisbury Plain area close to Stonehenge, c. 3000 BC. They were an agrarian Neolithic people; their name comes from Windmill Hill, a causewayed enclosure near Avebury. Together with another Neolithic tribe from East Anglia, a tribe whose worship involved stone circles, it is thought that they were responsible for the earliest work on the Stonehenge site.

The material record left by these people includes large circular hill-top enclosures, causewayed enclosures, long barrows, leaf-shaped arrowheads, and polished stone axes. They raised cattle, sheep, pigs, and dogs, and grew wheat and mined flints.

Since the term was coined by archaeologists, further excavation and analysis has indicated that it consisted of several discrete cultures such as the Hembury and Abingdon cultures; and that "Windmill Hill culture" is too general a term.

== See also ==
- Prehistoric Britain
