= Windmill Hill, Avebury =

Archaeological type site in England

UNESCO World Heritage Site
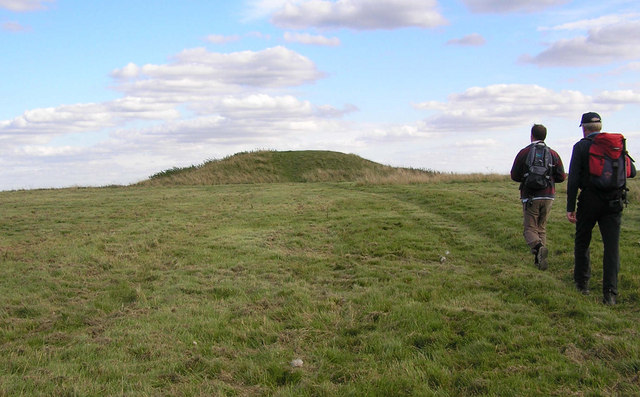

- Location within Wiltshire
- Location: Wiltshire, United Kingdom
- Part of: Avebury Section of Stonehenge, Avebury and Associated Sites
- Criteria: Cultural: (i), (ii), (iii)
- Reference: 373bis-002
- Inscription: 1986 (10th Session)
- Extensions: 2008
- Coordinates: 51°26′30″N 1°52′34″W

Windmill Hill is a Neolithic causewayed enclosure in the English county of Wiltshire, part of the Avebury World Heritage Site, about 1 mile (2 km) northwest of Avebury. Enclosing an area of 21 acres (8.5 ha), it is the largest known causewayed enclosure in Britain. The site was first occupied around 3800 BC, although the only evidence is a series of pits apparently dug by an agrarian society using Hembury pottery.

During a later phase, c. 3700 BC, three concentric segmented ditches were placed around the hilltop site, the outermost with a diameter of 365 metres. The causeways interrupting the ditches vary in width from a few centimetres to 7 m. Material from the ditches was piled up to create internal banks; the deepest ditches and largest banks are on the outer circuit. In the same period there was also a rectangular mortuary enclosure.

The site was designated as a scheduled monument in 1925. It came into the ownership of the National Trust in 1942 and is under the guardianship of English Heritage.

== Archaeological investigations ==
The site was bought by Alexander Keiller in 1924 and excavated over several seasons from 1925 to 1929 by Keiller and Harold St George Gray, whose work established it as the type site for causewayed camps, as they were then called. There were further excavations in 1957–1958.

Pottery from the bottom of the ditches was the type style for the Windmill Hill culture. Later occupation layers contained early Peterborough ware, then the later Mortlake and Fengate varieties. Large quantities of bone, both human and animal, were also recovered from the ditch fill. The camp remained in use throughout the rest of the Neolithic with Grooved ware and Beaker potsherds having been found in later deposits. A Bronze Age bell barrow was later built between the inner and middle rings.

Michael Dames has proposed a composite theory of seasonal rituals in an attempt to explain Windmill Hill and its associated sites: West Kennet Long Barrow, the Avebury henge, The Sanctuary, and Silbury Hill.

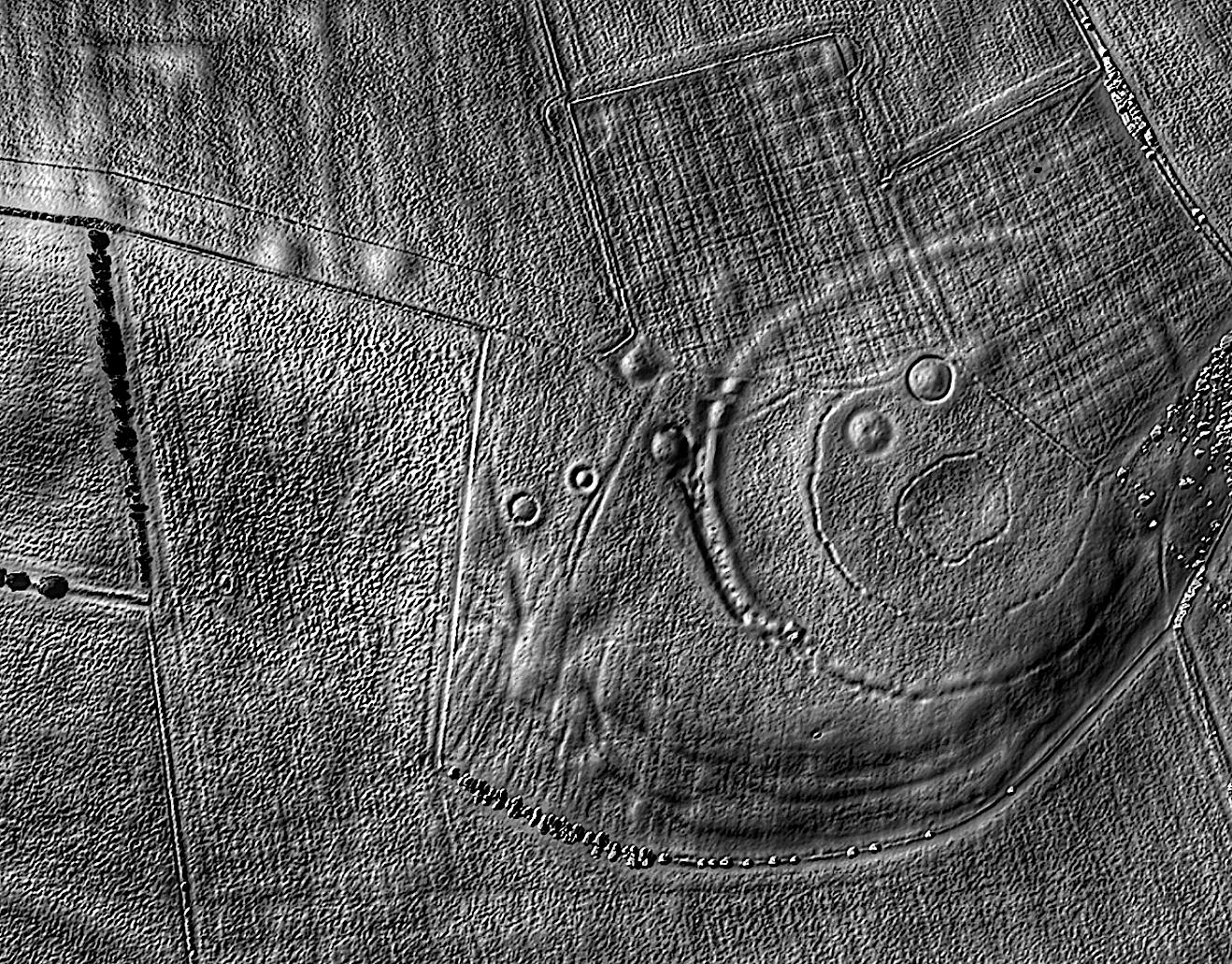
A lidar view of Windmill Hill.
