= Michael Dames =

British artist, art historian and geographer

Michael Dames (born 1938) is a British artist, art historian, archaeologist and geographer, who has written several books on megaliths and neolithic culture. He has focused much of his research on the prehistoric man-made earthwork from the Neolithic period, Silbury Hill, the second largest earthen mound in Europe, on a similar scale and volume as the pyramids in Egypt.

== Work ==
Dames has written extensively on the subject of the Neolithic-era human-made earthwork, Silbury Hill in his books, The Avebury Circle; Silbury: Resolving the Enigma; and The Silbury Treasure: The Great Goddess Rediscovered; and Roman Silbury and the harvest goddess.

The British archaeologist, Mike Pitts, describes Dames' analysis of the Avebury landscape as a "three-dimensional representation of a Neolithic fertility cycle." Wherein the Sanctuary, a major element of the Avebury complex, is an example of "symbolic architecture" describing "the Great Goddess in her early spring state."

David Matless, writing in his book, England's Green: Nature and Culture since the 1960s, states that Dames' theory that Silbury Hill reaches back "beyond an ancient patriarchal warrior society" to interpret the massive earthwork as a symbol of female divinity. Dames suggests that the earthwork represents the "Great Goddess' pregnant womb" and that the body of the goddess is represented by the surrounding moat.The American art historian, Lucy Lippard has also suggested this in her book Overlay: Contemporary Art and the Art of Prehistory.

His most recent book is Pagans Progress, published by MIT Press.

Dames has taught Prehistoric Design at the Sheffield Polytechnic from 1964 to 1968, and Art History at Birmingham Polytechnic from 1971 to 1976.

His public sculpture, The Mothers, is held in the collections of the Isle of Wight NHS Trust.

== Critical reception ==
In a review of his book published in The Guardian, Merlin and Wales: A Magician's Landscape, wrote that Dames has "reinvented" Merlin, as a "a perfect postmodern magician, an important bridge between ancient British lore and our own quantum sensibilities."

In a review by Brian Fallon, writing for The Irish Times, states that Dames' Mythic Ireland, is a stimulating "hybrid" book for which the author has done "much groundwork and genuine research" despite being tinged with "New Age religiosity".

== Selected publications ==
- The Silbury Treasure: The great goddess rediscovered. Thames and Hudson, London 1976, ISBN 0-500-27140-2
- Avebury Cycle. Thames and Hudson, London 1977, ISBN 0-500-05030-9
- Mythic Ireland. Thames and Hudson, London 1992, ISBN 0-500-01530-9
- A Journey Through Mythic Ireland. A Sacred Journey. Element Books, 2000, ISBN 1-86204-446-5 and Houghton Mifflin, 2000, ISBN 1-86204-546-1
- Merlin and Wales. A Magician's Landscape. Thames and Hudson, London 2004, ISBN 0-500-28496-2
- Taliesin's Travels. A Demi-god at Large. Heart of Albion Press, 2006, ISBN 1-872883-89-3
- Roman Silbury and the harvest goddess. Heart of Albion Press, Loughborough 2007, ISBN 978-1-905646-06-7
