= Overlay: Contemporary Art and the Art of Prehistory =

Art history book by Lucy Lippard

Overlay, 1983 book cover

Overlay: Contemporary Art and the Art of Prehistory is a book by the American author and curator Lucy Lippard that covers the correlation between contemporary Land art, site specific sculpture and prehistoric earthworks.

Its publication followed her book, Six Years: The Dematerialization of the Art Object.The New York Times describes Overlay as beginning where Six Years left off in 1972, thus highlighting art's forgotten "social origins and communal function" through the act of observing and reflecting upon the "times and places where art was inseparable from larger contexts."

Some of the prehistoric sites Lippard writes of include Avebury and Stonehenge and associated sites such as Silbury Hill. A selection of contemporary artists whose works are described in the book include Robert Smithson (who factors largely in the book), Mary Beth Edelson (and her Goddess performances), Richard Long, and his walking pieces, Nancy Holt (and her Sun Tunnels project), among others.

The author lived in southern England in 1977, in an isolated rural area, with the purpose of escaping from her discontent with the art world. While walking, she tripped over an upright standing stone in Dartmoor, and looking back behind her, she realized that she was in the middle of a long row of upright standing stones..."it took me a moment to understand that these stones had been placed there almost 4,000 years ago, and another moment to recognize their ties to much contemporary art."

== Critical reception ==
The book has been reviewed in The New York Times, Artforum Magazine, Woman's Art Journal, Art Documentation journal, among other publications.
