= Ad Hoc Committee of Women Artists =

Ad Hoc Committee of Women Artists or Ad Hoc Women Artists' Committee was founded in 1970 and included members from Women Artists in Revolution (WAR), the Art Workers' Coalition (AWC) and Women Students and Artists for Black Art Liberation (WSABAL). Founding members included Lucy Lippard, Poppy Johnson, Brenda Miller, Faith Ringgold and later, Nancy Spero.

== 1970 Whitney Museum Protest ==
The group's specific focus was to address the under-representation of women in the Whitney Museum's Painting and Sculpture Annual, the precursor to what is now known as the Whitney Biennial. During the months leading up to the exhibition in December 1970, the Ad Hoc Committee of Women Artists staged numerous protests, sit-ins, and interventions at the museum circulating their demand that 50% of artists represented in the upcoming exhibition be women, and that fifty percent of those women be black. The 1969 Whitney Sculptural Annual, for instance, featured 143 artists, eight of which were women. Coinciding with the opening of the 1970 Sculpture Annual, they printed fake tickets and distributed a forged press release stating that "half the artists in the exhibition would indeed be women, with a proportional percentage of black, Asian, and Puerto Rican artists," forcing the director of the museum to issue a statement to the contrary. The group also placed tampons and uncooked eggs around the Whitney Museum, on which the artists had written their "fifty percent" message. The group's actions had quantifiable results—the number of women represented rose from 4.5 to 22 percent in one year.

Faith Ringgold describes some of this protest work in her memoir, We Flew Over the Bridge: The Memoirs of Faith Ringgold. Ringgold writes, "The Whitney Museum became the focus of our attention. We went there often to deposit eggs. Unsuspecting male curatorial staff would pick up the eggs and experience the shock of having raw egg slide down the pants of their fine tailor-made suits. Sanitary napkins followed...Generally, everywhere the staff went they found loud and clear messages that women artists were on the Whitney's case."

== Further works ==
In the winter of 1970-71 the group established the Women's Art Registry, a slide collection of work by female artists, which served as a model for later registries like West-East Bag (W.E.B.). The registry was housed by several galleries, including cooperatives 55 Mercer and A.I.R., before going to Special Collections and University Archives at Rutgers University in New Jersey, where it is now archived.

In 1972, the committee (on the colophon listed as: Maude Boltz, Loretta Dunkelman, Joan Snyder, Nancy Spero, May Stevens and Joyce Kozloff) published the Rip-Off File. The 'dossier' was based on responses they received when Spero and Kozloff sent letters to 800 women in the art world asking for stories about their experiences with sexism and discrimination. The Rip-Off File was installed as an exhibition at the Mabel Smith Douglass Library during the 1973–74 academic year.
