= West-East Bag =

Network of women artists

West-East Bag (WEB) was an international women artists network active from 1971 to 1973.

West-East Bag formed towards the beginning of the feminist art movement in the United States. Sources differ as to the exact origin of WEB. In one account, artists Judy Chicago and Miriam Schapiro formed the idea with art critic Lucy R. Lippard in April 1971 after visiting the exhibition 26 Women Artists. A second account places New York Times art writer Grace Glueck at the formation and a third has Chicago and Schapiro meeting Lippard, Marcia Tucker and Ellen Lanyon during a lecture trip. Lippard recalls mentioning East Coast Bag while talking to Chicago, who replied "ah ha, if you're going to say East Coast Bag then we're going to call it West East Bag instead of East West Bag, because the west coast came first."

Enemies of women's liberation in the art world must be met with a more coherent front. A group that is locally effective can be doubly powerful if it synchronizes its actions with those of other groups across the country. We can gain from each other's experiences and make more headway together if we are aware of each other's activities in time to echo or support them.

— First issue of W.E.B.

In 1971, West-East Bag published the first issue of their newsletter W.E.B. to link efforts in their home cities. The inaugural issue made mention of tactics used against museums to protest the lack of women artists in their collections and exhibitions. Schapiro (Los Angeles), Lippard (New York), and Ellen Lanyon (Chicago) took turns producing the then-monthly newsletter.

Like the Ad Hoc Women Artists' Committee before them, the group encouraged chapters to set up slide registries, creating an archive of the work of women artists on photographic slides. WEB slide registries were created in New York, Los Angeles, San Francisco, Chicago, and Seattle. WEB members also held consciousness raising sessions and organized protests of their local art institutions.

Local chapters such as Boston and Chicago published their own WEB newsletters, sponsored conferences, and organized monthly meetings. By April 1972, Chicago's WEB chapter had sponsored a series of conferences that led to the formation of feminist arts organizations across the Midwest. WEB members in Chicago organized the first women artists' conference there, Artists Meet in Spring 1973.

West-East Bag laid the foundation for a series of cooperatively run women's galleries, starting with A.I.R. Gallery in 1972. West-East Bag grew to include representatives from 52 cities and eight countries. By 1973, WEB ceased being active on a national level.

== See also ==
- Women's Art Movement, an Australian movement
