= Loretta Dunkelman =

American artist

Loretta Dunkelman, (born 1937 in Paterson, NJ) is an American artist based in New York City, NY. She studied at what is now Rutgers University, but was the New Jersey College for Women and later the Doulgass Residential College, where she completed a Bachelor's Degree in Art in 1958 and completed a Master's Degree at Hunter College in 1966.

Dunkelman is a co-founder of the A.I.R. Gallery, which claims to be the first not-for-profit, artist-directed and maintained gallery for women artists in the United States. She was also a member of the Ad Hoc Committee of Women Artists. She co-organized the notable group show Thirteen Women Artists in 1972, which was mounted at 117 Prince Street.

Her image is included in the iconic 1972 poster Some Living American Women Artists by Mary Beth Edelson.

== Collections ==
Her work is included in the permanent collections of the Museum of Modern Art, New York, Whitney Museum of American Art and the Smithsonian American Art Museum.

== List of Works ==
- Ice-Sky (1971-2)
