= Diana Reynell =

British grotto designer

Diana Reynell

Diana Reynell (9 September 1933 – 1 August 2017) was a British grotto designer and restorer.

== Early life ==
Reynell was born Diana Baldwin on 9 September 1933 to Joseph Baldwin, an Oxfordshire bank manager, and his wife. Diana's mother and brother died in childbirth when she was three years old. She was educated at schools in Witney and Faringdon in Oxfordshire, and The Kingsley School in Warwickshire. She subsequently studied at an art school in Oxford where she met her future husband Antony Reynell.

== Career ==
After her marriage in 1955, Reynell joined her husband at Marlborough College where he taught classics and she taught jewellery design. The couple had four children.

Reynell's first grotto restoration was of a room dug into the Marlborough Mound, in the grounds of the college, for Lady Hertford.

In the late 1980s, she created the shellwork in the subterranean grotto at Leeds Castle and restored the grotto at Hampton Court House.

== Death ==
Reynell died on 1 August 2017 from the effects of lung cancer and Parkinson's disease.
