= West Kennet Long Barrow =

Neolithic tomb in Wiltshire, England

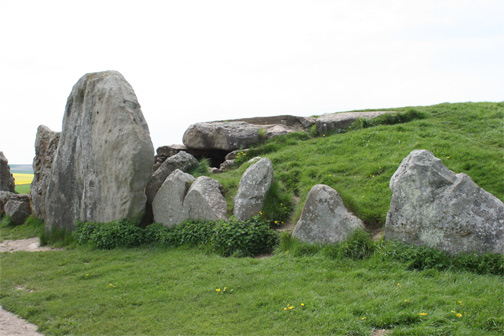
- The long barrow in 2005

- Map showing location in Wiltshire
- 51°24′30.83″N 1°51′3.9″W
- Type: Tumulus
- Location: Wiltshire, England

History
- Built: c. 3650 BC

Site notes
- Excavation dates: 1859, 1955-1956

UNESCO World Heritage Site
- Official name: Stonehenge, Avebury and Associated Sites
- Type: Cultural
- Criteria: i, ii, iii
- Designated: 1986 (10th session)
- Reference no.: 373
- Region: Europe and North America

The West Kennet Long Barrow, also known as South Long Barrow, is a chambered long barrow near the village of Avebury in the south-western English county of Wiltshire. Probably constructed in the thirty-seventh century BC, during Britain's Early Neolithic period. Today it survives in a partially reconstructed state.

Archaeologists have established that the monument was built by pastoralist communities shortly after the introduction of agriculture to Britain from continental Europe. Although representing part of an architectural tradition of long barrow building that was widespread across Neolithic Europe, the West Kennet Long Barrow belongs to a localised regional variant of barrows in Western Britain, now known as the Cotswold-Severn Group. Of these, it is part of a cluster of around thirty centred on Avebury in the uplands of northern Wiltshire.

Built out of earth, local sarsen megaliths, and oolitic limestone imported from the Cotswolds, the long barrow consisted of a sub-rectangular earthen tumulus enclosed by kerb-stones. Its precise date of construction is not known. Human bones were placed within the chamber, probably between 3670 and 3635 BC, representing a mixture of men, women, children, and adults. There is then an apparent hiatus in the use of the site as a place of burial, probably lasting over a century. Between 3620 and 3240 BC it likely began to be re-used as a burial space, receiving both human and animal remains over a period of several centuries. Various flint tools and ceramic sherds were also placed within it during this time. In the Late Neolithic, the entrance to the long barrow was blocked up with the addition of large sarsen boulders. During the Later Neolithic and Early Bronze Age, the landscape around West Kennet Long Barrow was subject to the widespread construction of ceremonial monuments, among them the Avebury henge and stone circles, the West Kennet Avenue, The Sanctuary, and Silbury Hill.

During the Romano-British period, a small coin hoard was buried in the side of the long barrow. The ruin attracted the interest of antiquarians in the 17th century, while archaeological excavation took place in 1859 and again in 1955-1956, after which it underwent reconstruction. Now a scheduled monument under the guardianship of English Heritage, it is classified as part of the "Stonehenge, Avebury and Associated Sites" UNESCO World Heritage Site and is open without charge to visitors all year round.

== Location ==
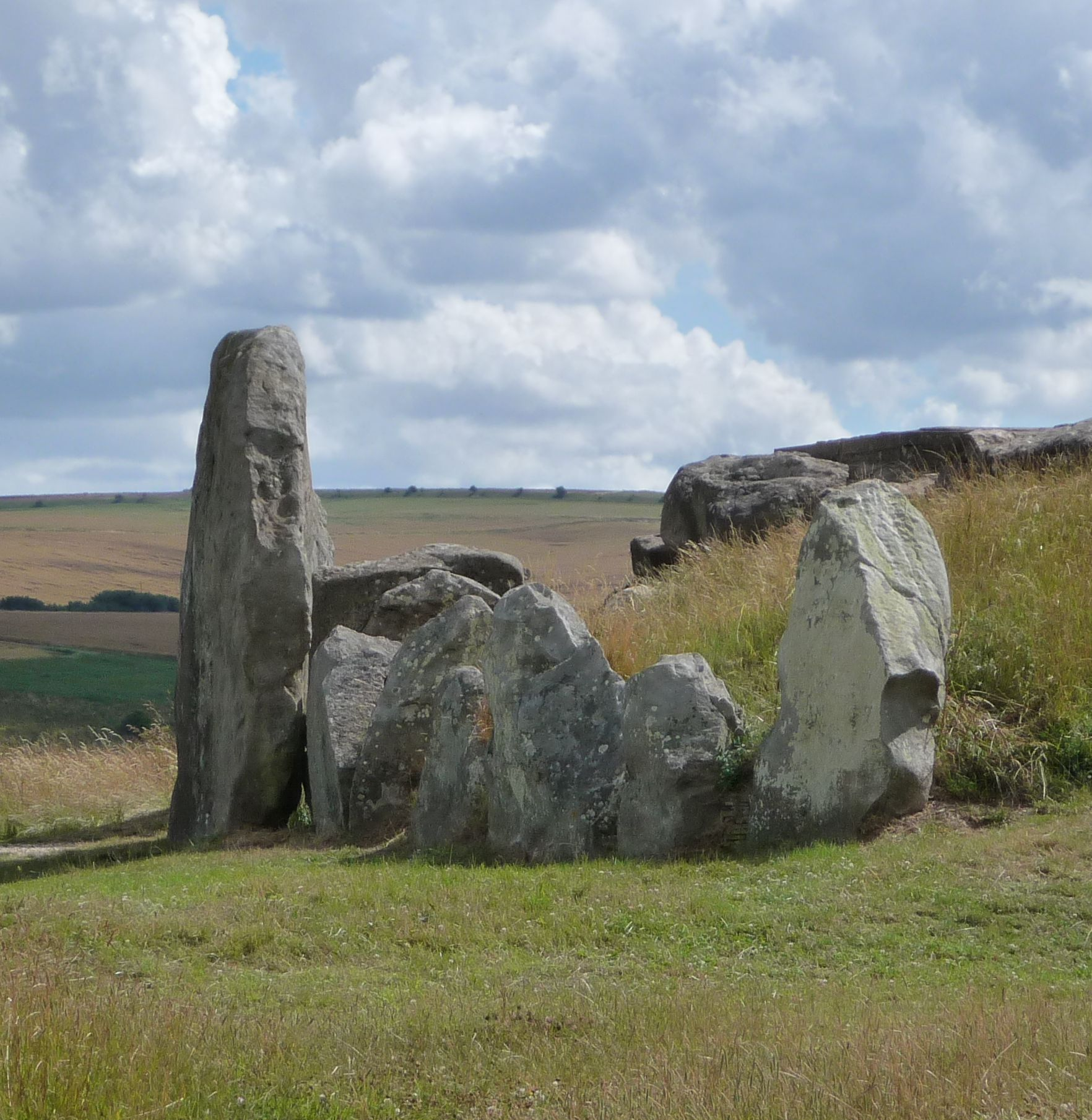
The stones at the entrance to the chamber in West Kennet Long Barrow

West Kennet Long Barrow is found near the village of Avebury in central Wiltshire. It occupies a prominent place on the crest of a hill, just above the upper Kennet valley. To the north, it offers views of Avebury, and to the south St Anne's Hill and Wansdyke.

== Context ==
The Early Neolithic was a revolutionary period of British history. Between 4500 and 3800 BC, it saw a widespread change in lifestyle as the communities living in the British Isles adopted agriculture as their primary form of subsistence, abandoning the hunter-gatherer lifestyle that had characterised the preceding Mesolithic period. This came about through contact with continental societies, although it is unclear to what extent this can be attributed to an influx of migrants or to indigenous Mesolithic Britons adopting agricultural technologies from the continent. Britain was largely forested in this period. Throughout most of the island, there is little evidence of cereal or permanent dwellings from this period, leading archaeologists to believe that the Early Neolithic economy on the island was largely pastoral, relying on herding cattle, with people living a nomadic or semi-nomadic life.

=== The Cotswold-Severn tombs ===
Across Western Europe, the Early Neolithic marked the first period in which humans built monumental structures in the landscape. These structures included chambered long barrows, rectangular or oval earthen tumuli with a chamber built into one end. Some chambers were made of timber, and others using large stones, now known as "megaliths". Long barrows often served as tombs, housing the dead within their chamber. Bodies were rarely buried alone in the Early Neolithic, instead being interred in collective burials with other members of their community. These chambered tombs were built all along the Western European seaboard during the Early Neolithic, from south-eastern Spain up to southern Sweden, taking in most of the British Isles; the architectural tradition was introduced to Britain from continental Europe in the first half of the fourth millennium BCE. Although there are stone buildings—like Göbekli Tepe in modern Turkey—which predate them, the chambered long barrows constitute humanity's first widespread tradition of construction using stone.

The clearings in which these barrows were sited seemed to have accrued significance over time. In each case initial utilisation of these places may have been fairly routine - for occupation, cultivation, grazing, or simply acting as nodal points in networks of paths. But the body of stories, memories and associations these places held would have grown, some perhaps eventually being imbued with even mythical significance. That led to many becoming the focus for ritual or special activity sometime before the barrows were constructed.

— Joshua Pollard and Andrew Reynolds on the long barrows of northern Wiltshire

The archaeologists Joshua Pollard and Andrew Reynolds noted that by the mid-fourth millennium BC, the landscape around Avebury "was being stealthily transformed". Around thirty Early Neolithic long barrows are known from the uplands of northern Wiltshire, 17 of which were definitely or probably chambered, the others being unchambered. There may have been more than this during the Early Neolithic, with various examples having been destroyed by agricultural activity over the intervening millennia. The survivors are distributed across an area of northern Wiltshire measuring about 20 kilometres by 15 kilometres, centred near Avebury.

Their landscape locations vary; some are in valley bottoms, others are on hilltops or on the slopes of hills. Intervisibility between them does not appear to have been a relevant factor in their placement, as many have restricted views and may have been surrounded by woodland. Many of those which have been excavated show evidence for having been placed on sites that had already witnessed human activity, such as clearance, cultivation, or occupation. Pollard and Reynolds suggested that this indicated "a genuine attempt to draw upon the past associations of particular places".

== Design and construction ==
It is probable that the site on which West Kennet Long Barrow was built had been used for older human activity. This is evidenced by sherds of a plain bowl that excavators found in soil beneath the monument during the 1950s. The architectural style of the Long Barrow, coupled with the style of the primary interments of human remains, led archaeologists who excavated in the 1950s to believe that it was Early Neolithic in date. A nearby monument, the Windmill Hill causewayed enclosure, revealed three radiocarbon dates which demonstrated that it was Early Neolithic, leading archaeologists to consider an Early Neolithic date for the Long Barrow.

The presence of a kink in the flanking ditches, identified by resistivity survey in the 1960s, has led archaeologists to suggest that the long barrow may have been constructed in several phases. It is possible that the West Kennet Long Barrow was once a smaller movement that underwent expansion during the Early Neolithic period. In this it would compare with another Cotswold-Severn chambered long barrow, Wayland's Smithy, which underwent expansion. Several of the long barrows excavated in northern Wiltshire, such as those under South Street and Beckhampton Road, contained small structures prior to the erection of barrows on those sites. Pollard and Reynolds suggested that these may have been "small 'shrines' perhaps set up to appease local spirits or ancestral guardians".

=== The mound ===
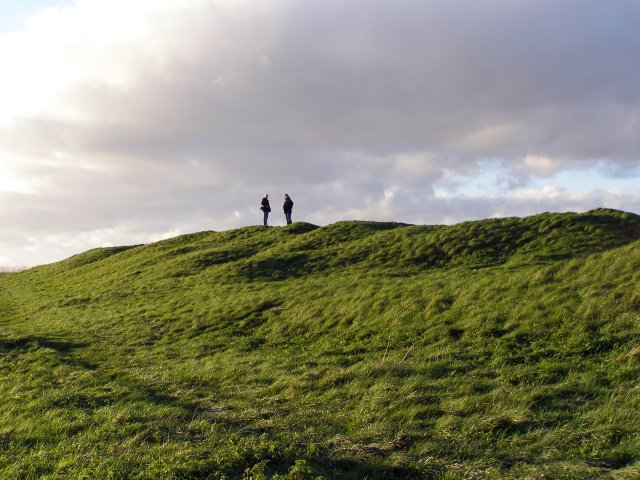
The barrow of West Kennet Long Barrow

West Kennet Long Barrow is 100 metres long and 20 metres wide. The archaeologist Timothy Darvill noted that it was far larger than most long barrows, although comparisons could be seen with other examples such as Long Low in Derbyshire and Colnpen.

A ditch flanks the monument on each side.

=== The chamber ===
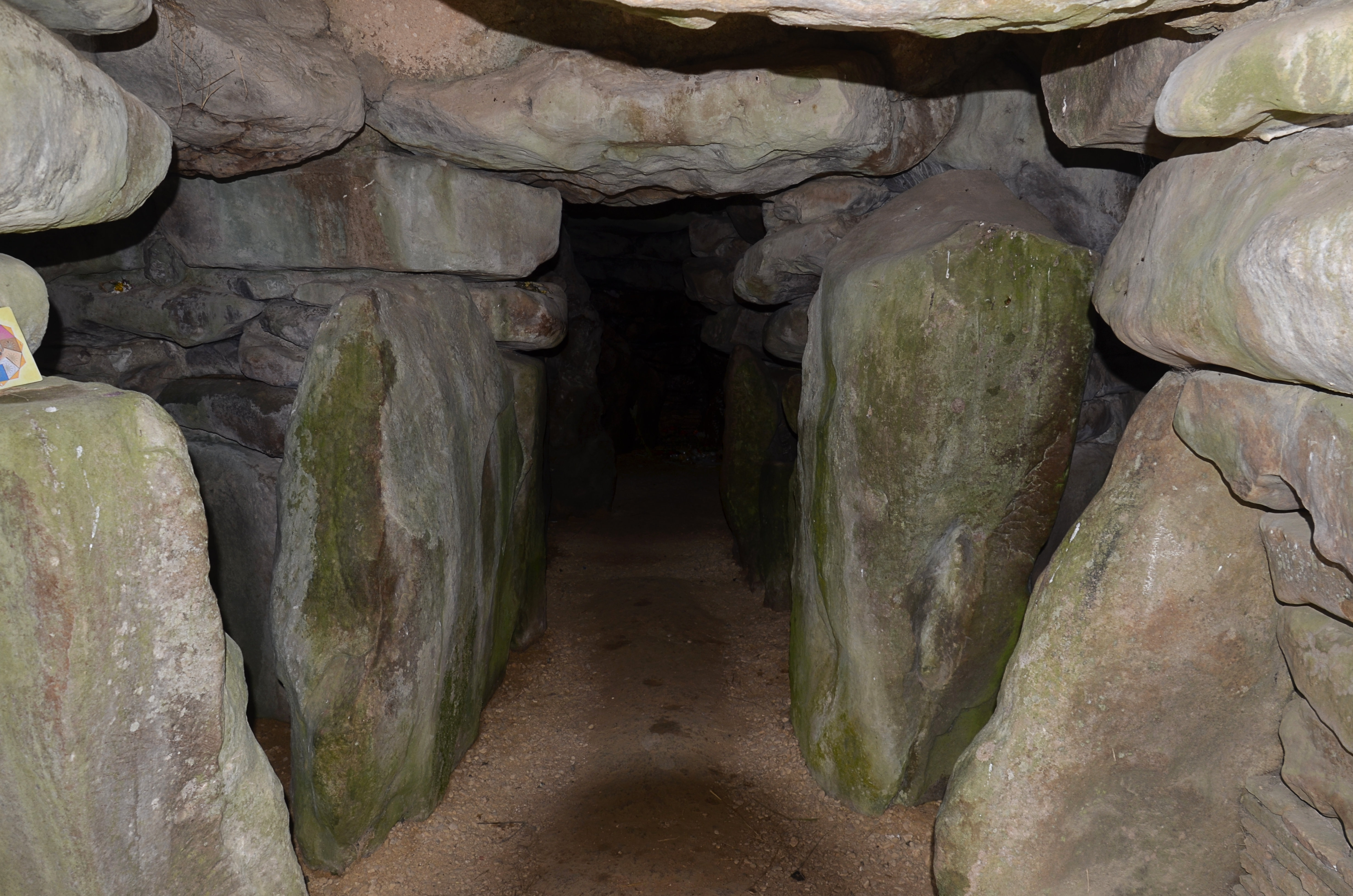
The chamber of West Kennet Long Barrow

The stone chamber has been characterised as being "more elaborate" than most other examples in the Cotswold-Severn group. It is built from sarsens. It extends for 12 metres inside the barrow. The roof is set between 1.7 metres and 2.2 metres above the chamber floor. This is high enough to allow visitors to stand upright, a rare feature of chambered long barrows. More typical chambered long barrows such as Belas Knap and Uley Long Barrow, have chambers less than one metre in height. Pollard and Reynolds suggested that "this was not a closed space, but one that facilitated ready access to mortuary remains and perhaps allowed a select few to gather periodically within the chambers in order to commune with the dead and ancestors."

Pollard and Reynolds believed that the inclusion of stone-sharpening stones in the barrow was a deliberate choice made to "appropriate the histories and associations of these stones". Oolitic limestone was also used in the dry stone walling of West Kennet Long Barrow; it was also used in this manner at Adam's Grave, while smaller fragments of this stone were found in unchambered long barrows at Shepherd's Store, Easton Down, Horslip, and Kitchen Barrow. This stone does not occur naturally in this area of northern Wiltshire, but would have had to be brought from the area around Frome and Bath. It is possible that it was chosen for inclusion in these monuments because of its associations with a far-off place, because of its aesthetic qualities, or because it was believed to contain the essence of supernatural beings. It is also possible that the builders of these monuments viewed the area of the Cotswolds as their ancestral homeland and that the use of oolitic limestone in these structures was a means of linking themselves to their past.

=== Use as a tomb ===
Radiocarbon dates retrieved from skeletal material inside the long barrow suggested that the oldest individuals within it died around 3670–3635 calibrated BC (81% probability) or 3575–3545 calibrated BC (14% probability). The last burials in this primary phase occurred in 3640–3610 calibrated BC (77% probability) or 3550–3520 calibrated BC (18% probability). This suggests that the initial use of the long barrow as a burial space lasted only for a "short duration": 10 to 30 years (68% probability) or 1 to 55 years (94% probability). This data suggested that West Kennet Long Barrow was probably constructed between 3670–3635 calibrated BC (81% probability) or 3575–3745 calibrated BC (14% probability), to house individuals who had only recently died. It is possible that the monument predated the deaths by some time, or that the bones were kept elsewhere prior to being placed in the barrow, in which case the long barrow might be either older or slightly younger.

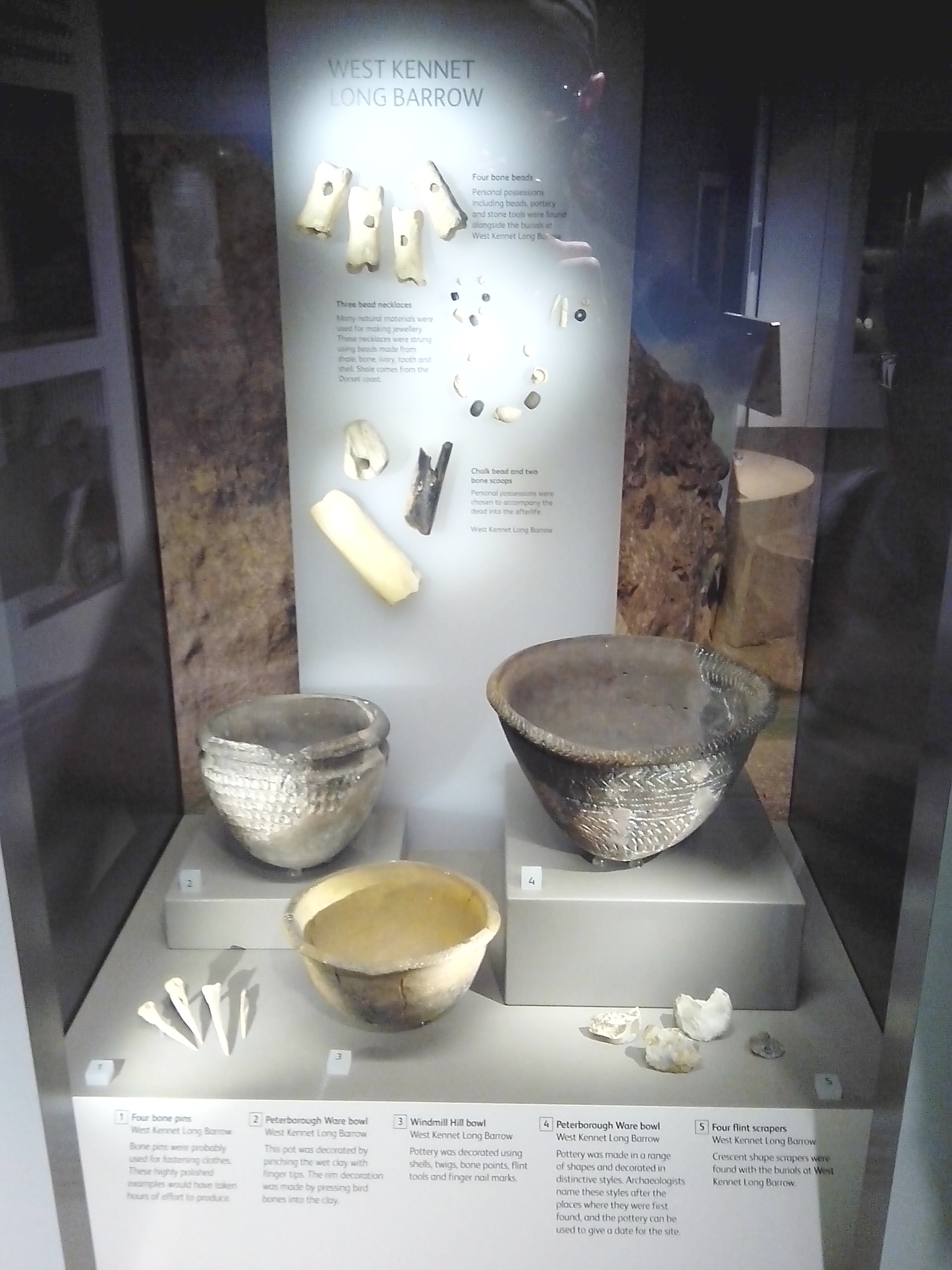
Artefacts recovered from West Kennet Long Barrow on display in Wiltshire Museum, Devizes

This initial phase of burial was followed by a hiatus, probably lasting over a century, before a secondary phase of burial began. During this period the long barrow displayed signs of decay, with portions of the drystone walling collapsing. Bayliss et al. suggested that in this period, the West Kennet Long Barrow "was a monument whose fabric and contents were no longer at the forefront of people's minds, or no longer accessible."

According to radiocarbon dating, a secondary phase of burial began in 3620–3240 calibrated BC (95% probability) and lasted until the second half of the third millennium calibrated BC. This secondary stage therefore stretched over a period of centuries. This in-fill was marked by sarsen slabs covering the original inhumations, followed by layers of chalk rubble, earth and sarsen, and human and animal remains. Many of these remains were of young people; the south-east chamber for instance included the bodies of at least five infants. It is possible that these human remains were collected together over a period of centuries outside the long barrow and only placed within it as part of a single event.

The secondary burial deposits included artefacts alongside the human remains. Flint and bone tools were present. Pottery included Grooved ware, Beaker ware, and all three styles of Peterborough ware: Ebbsfleet, Mortlake, and Fengate. Collectively, this pottery came from at least 250 different vessels. Pollard and Reynolds noted that "even at a conservative estimate", these ceramic sherds "could span a thousand years".

=== Termination ===
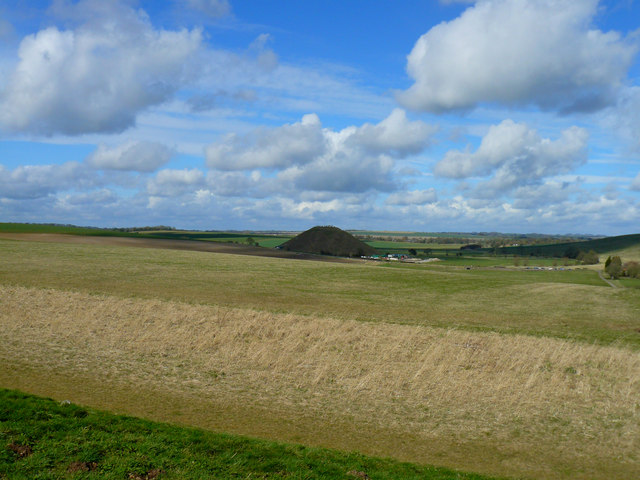
View of Silbury Hill from West Kennet Long Barrow

During the third millennium BC, sarsen boulders and earth were used to partially block the forecourt. In the late third millennium BC, a façade of three large sarsen stones was erected across the forecourt, blocking any further entrance to the chamber. This act may have been roughly contemporary with, or slightly later than, the main stone phases at the Avebury stone circle and the Sanctuary, during the end of the Late Neolithic period and the start of the Early Bronze Age.

The West Kennet Long Barrow, along with the East Kennet Long Barrow and Windmill Hill, are among the features visible from the Sanctuary.

=== Meaning and purpose ===
Britain's Early Neolithic communities placed greater emphasis on the ritual burial of the dead than their Mesolithic forebears. Archaeologists have suggested that this is because Early Neolithic Britons adhered to an ancestor cult that venerated the spirits of the dead, believing that they could intercede with the forces of nature for the benefit of their living descendants. Early Neolithic people may have entered into the tombs—which doubled as temples or shrines—to perform rituals honouring the dead and requesting their assistance. The historian Ronald Hutton termed these monuments "tomb-shrines" to reflect their dual purpose.

In Britain, these tombs were typically sited on prominent hills and slopes overlooking the landscape, perhaps at the junction between different territories. The archaeologist Caroline Malone noted that the tombs would have served as landscape markers that conveyed information on "territory, political allegiance, ownership, and ancestors". Many archaeologists have subscribed to the idea that these tomb-shrines were territorial markers between different tribes; others have argued that such markers would be of little use to a nomadic herding society. Instead it has been suggested that they represent markers along herding pathways. The archaeologist Richard Bradley suggested that the construction of these monuments reflects an attempt to mark control and ownership over the land, showing a change in mindset brought about by the transition from the hunter-gatherer Mesolithic to the pastoralist Early Neolithic. Others have suggested that these monuments were built on sites already deemed sacred by Mesolithic hunter-gatherers.

== Human remains ==
Inhumation burials inside the long barrow were discovered by excavation in 1859, and again in 1955–1956. In the early 1980s, four of the bones recovered in the 1950s were subject to radiocarbon dating at the University of Oxford. In the early 2000s the bones were re-examined by osteoarchaeologists, who obtained radiocarbon dates from 25 human skeletons and one goat skeleton from inside the barrow. They reported that the 1950s reports made errors in the understandings of these human remains, for instance by failing to always make a distinction between the primary and secondary deposits.

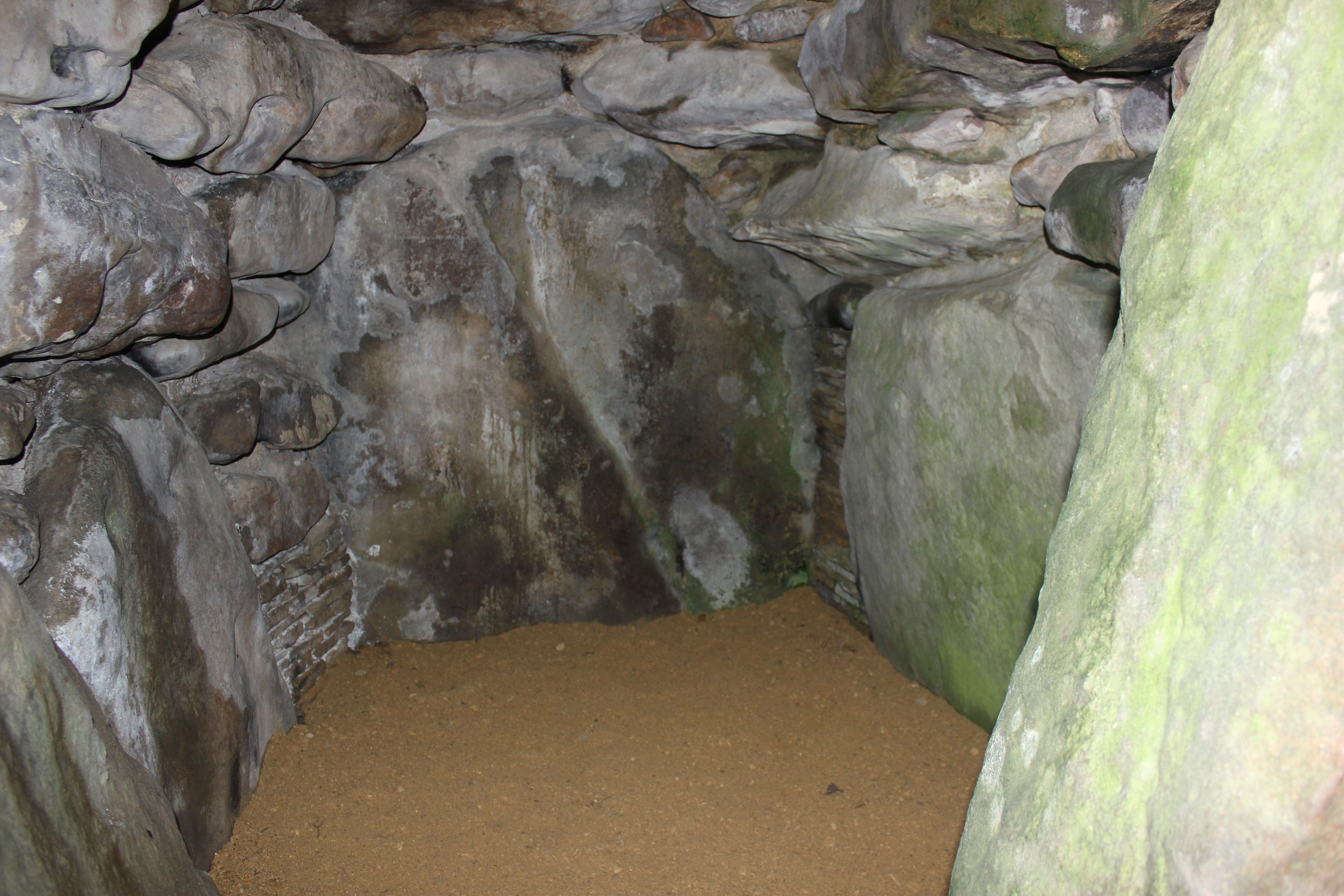
One of the side chambers inside the central chamber of West Kennet Long Barrow

Piggott argued that a total of 43 individuals were included in these primary deposits. Later reassessment of the evidence suggested that there were more likely 36 individuals interred in the long barrow. However, the osteoarchaeologists Martin Smith and Megan Brickley noted that "demographic divisions" proved "hard to discern" among the skeletal material from West Kennet. The skeletal remains were of both sexes, with the ratio of male and female skeletons being roughly balanced. The remains were also of various ages, as four of the five transepts contained both adults and young people.

The 2000s study found sufficient body parts from at least five people that they could state that these were "probably in an articulated or partially articulated state when deposited." Radiocarbon dating indicated that all the individuals interred during the primary phase died at a time period comparatively closely to one another, and that it is possible that they "could have died at the same time".

One of the skeletons from inside the long barrow, that of an adult male, contained an arrowhead near the throat. This may have been imbedded in the man's throat at the time of his death. The barrow also included a small cremation deposit.

== Later history ==
Romano-British finds commonly occur in and around Early Neolithic monuments in Britain. Six bronze Roman coins were buried into the topsoil near the sarsen façade and recovered during the 1955–56 excavation. Romano-British ritual activity is known from the broader area around the long barrow; several shafts were dug around the Shallow Head Springs near Silbury Hill in this period, into which a range of items were placed. In addition, a building that possibly served a religious function was established south of Silbury Hill.

During the late 17th century, a Dr R. Toope of Marlborough dug into the barrow looking for human remains that he could use in his preparation of medicines. The site was designated as a monument in 1882.

== Tourism and Modern Paganism ==
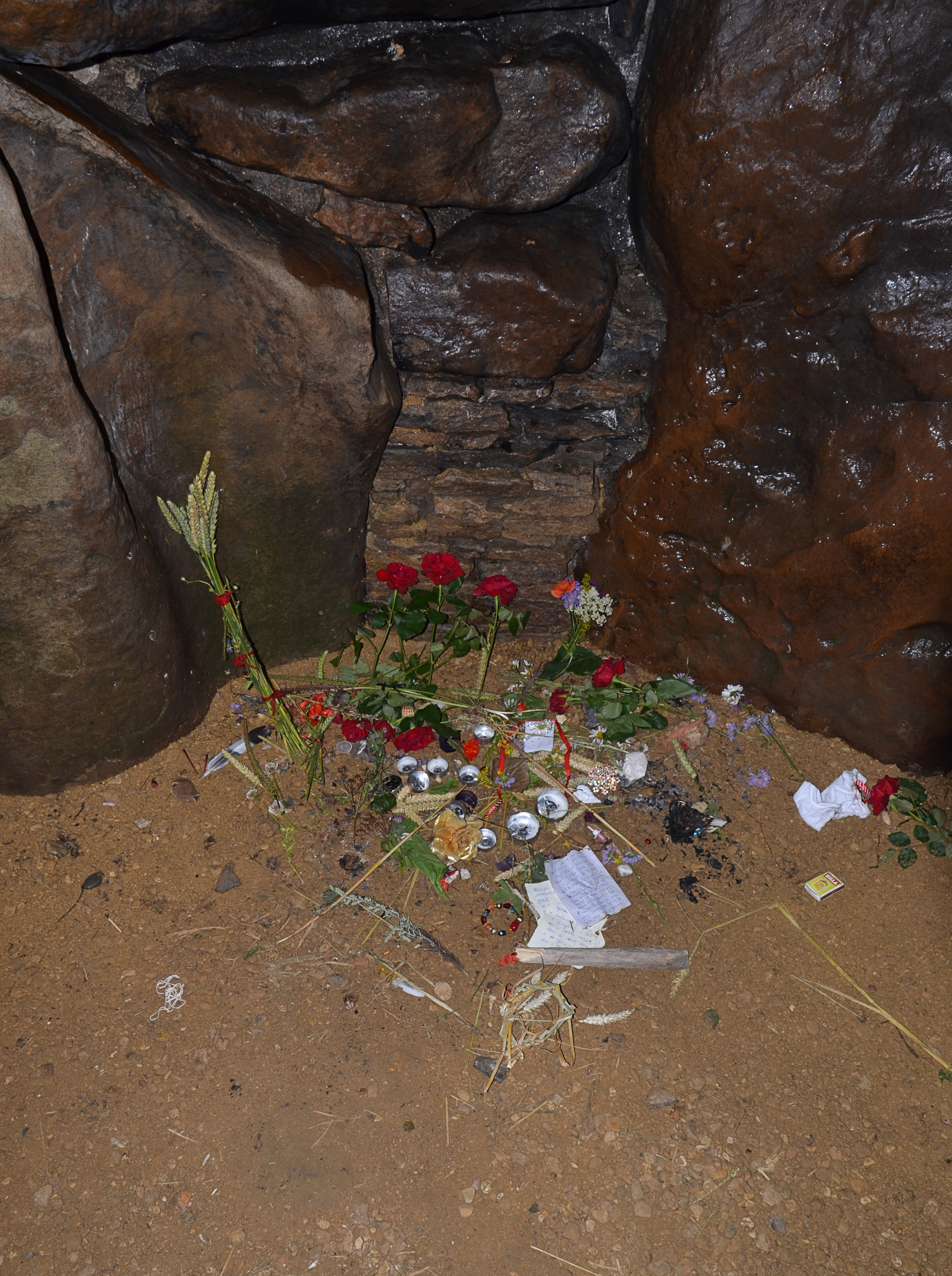
Offerings placed inside the chamber of West Kennet Long Barrow

West Kennet Long Barrow now serves as a tourist attraction. In 1997, the cultural historian Richard Hayman noted that it was "a tomb no more, it has become a sanitised cultural commodity."

Many modern Pagans view West Kennet Long Barrow as a "temple" and use it for their rituals. Some see it as a place of the ancestors where they can engage in "vision quests" and other neo-shamanic practices. Others have seen it as a womb of the Great Goddess, and as a sort of living entity. The winter solstice has been a particularly popular occasion for Pagans to visit. Modern Pagan visitors have often left items, including tea lights, incense, flowers, fruit, and coins, in the long barrow, often regarding these as offerings to "spirits" which they believe reside there. Various fires lit within the long barrow have left scorch marks and damaged the stones; one of the sarsens had to be glued back together after having been fractured by the heat of fire. Some Pagans have advocated for all human remains found within the barrow to be re-buried within it, after which they believe the chamber should again be sealed.

== Antiquarian and archaeological investigation ==
The antiquarian John Aubrey described West Kennet Long Barrow in his manuscript, Monumenta Britannica. There, he stated that the barrow did not have a name, also providing an illustration of it. It was again described and illustrated the following century, by the antiquarian William Stukeley. Stukeley named it the South Long Barrow, in reference to its position in respect to Avebury and Silbury Hill. Circa 1814, the long barrow was reported on by the antiquarian Richard Hoare amid his descriptions of the archaeological sites in Wiltshire.

In the autumn of 1859, John Thurnham carried out an excavation at West Kennet Long Barrow under the auspices of the Wiltshire Archaeological and Natural History Society. He had previously excavated Uley Long Barrow in Gloucestershire earlier that decade. In excavating at West Kennet, Thurnham used patients from a mental asylum as labourers, presenting it as a form of occupational therapy for them. Thurnham excavated the western chamber, in which he discovered bones from what he believed were six crouched inhumation burials. In 2009, Smith and Brickley noted that Thurnham's "recording remains haphazard and arbitrary by modern standards, as do some of his interpretations" although added that his "examination and recording of the skeletal material is more thorough than was typical previously".

A second excavation took place over the course of 1955 and 1956, overseen by Stuart Piggott and Richard J. C. Atkinson. Atkinson and Piggott's excavations revealed the four side chambers and the various human remains that those contained. Darvill noted that Piggott and Atkinson's research was "rapidly published" and probably had "the greatest impact" of any Cotswold-Severn long barrow excavation in the mid-20th century.

In November 2016, Cotswold Archaeology were employed to oversee an archaeological watching brief during remedial works at the long barrow. As part of this project, the three top lights in the roof of the barrow were replaced, a membrane was added to the internal floor to improve drainage, and the eastern end of the barrow was re-profiled to add material lost to erosion.
