= Abingdon ware =

Abingdon ware is a Middle Neolithic (3900–3200 BC), decorated, round-bottomed pottery found in an ancient causewayed enclosure at Abingdon-on-Thames, whence the name, about 15 kilometres south of Oxford, as well as in the upper Thames valley and central England.

Abingdon ware belongs to the earliest pottery found in Great Britain and was discovered together with a handful of Peterborough, Grooved and Beaker ware as well as Bronze Age sherds. It is a regional variation of the so-called Southern Decorated series. The Abingdon Causewayed Enclosure has been dated to the 37th or 36th century BC.

== See also ==
- Prehistoric Britain

== Literature ==
- Darvill, Timothy (2008). Oxford Concise Dictionary of Archaeology, 2nd ed., Oxford University Press, Oxford and New York, ISBN 978-0-19-953404-3.
- Historic England, Abingdon Causewayed Enclosure. Detail of the type location
