= Lucy R. Lippard =

American art curator (born 1937)

Lucy Rowland Lippard
- Born: April 14, 1937 (age 89); New York City, New York, US
- Occupations: Writer, art critic, art historian, activist, curator
- Spouse: Robert Ryman (m. 1960–1966; divorced)
- Children: 1
- Awards: Guggenheim Fellowship (1968), CAA Frank Jewett Mather Award for Criticism (1975), CAA Distinguished Feminist Award (2012), CAA Distinguished Lifetime Achievement Award for Writing on Art (2015)

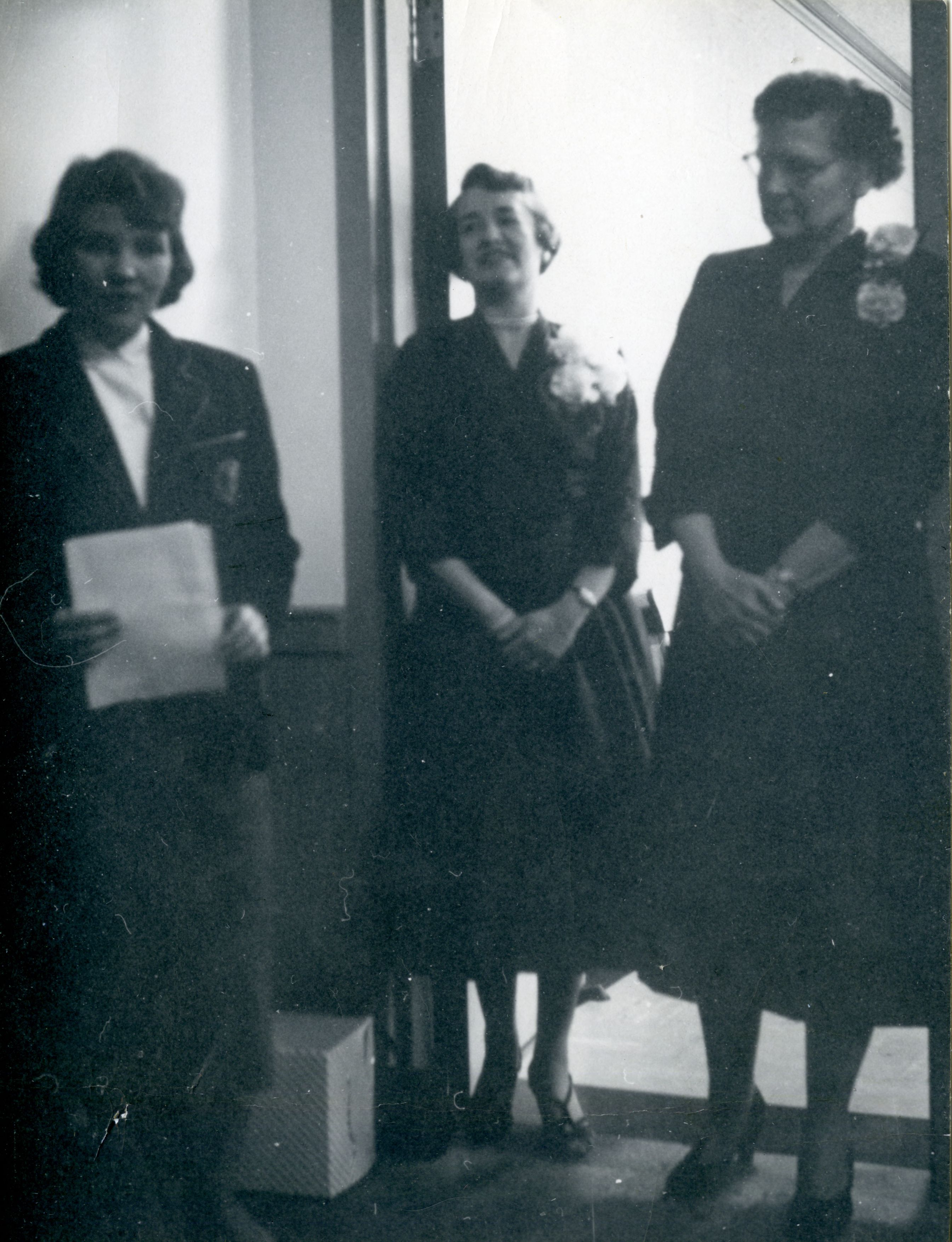
Abbot Academy, George Ezra Abbot Gymnasium Dedication, including Miss Hearsey and Lucy Lippard, Class of 1954

Lucy Rowland Lippard (born April 14, 1937) is an American writer, art critic, activist, and curator. Lippard was among the first writers to argue for the "dematerialization" at work in conceptual art and was an early champion of feminist art. She is the author of thirty books and has curated some fifty exhibitions in the United States, Europe, and Latin America. Lippard lives and works in Galisteo, New Mexico.

== Early life and education ==
Lucy Rowland Lippard was born on April 14, 1937, in New York City. She lived in New Orleans and Charlottesville, Virginia, before enrolling at Abbot Academy in 1952. Her father, Vernon W. Lippard, a pediatrician, was assistant dean at Columbia University College of Physicians and Surgeons in 1939, followed by appointments as dean of Louisiana State University School of Medicine in New Orleans and the same position at the University of Virginia. From 1952 to 1967, he was dean of his alma mater, Yale School of Medicine. Each of these very different places played a significant role in Lippard's childhood, as did the family summer home in Maine.

She graduated from Smith College with a B.A. degree in 1958. She went on to earn an M.A. degree in art history in 1962 from the Institute of Fine Arts at New York University.

Just out of college, Lippard began working in the library at the Museum of Modern Art in 1958 where, in addition to reshelving the library after a fire, she was "farmed out" to do research for curators. She credits these years of working at MoMA, paging, filing, and researching, with preparing her "well for the archival, informational aspect of conceptual art." At MoMA she worked with curators such as Bill Lieberman, Bill Seitz and Peter Selz. By 1966, she had curated two traveling exhibitions for MoMA, one on "soft sculpture" and one on Max Ernst, as well as worked with Kynaston McShine on Primary Structures before he was hired by the Jewish Museum, taking the show with him. It was at MoMA that Lippard met Sol LeWitt who was working the night desk; John Button, Dan Flavin, Al Held, Robert Mangold, and Robert Ryman all held positions at the museum during this time as well.

In 1960, she married then-emerging painter Robert Ryman, who worked at MoMA as a museum guard from 1953 until 1960. Before divorcing six years later, the couple had one child, Ethan Ryman, who eventually became an artist himself.

== Career ==
In 1966, Lucy Lippard organized the exhibition Eccentric Abstraction at Fischbach Gallery in New York. With this exhibition, Lippard brought together a group of abstract artists which included Alice Adams, Louise Bourgeois, Lindsey Decker, Eva Hesse, Gary Kuehn, Bruce Nauman, Keith Sonnier, and more. The exhibition focused on the ‘use of organic abstract form in sculpture evoking the gendered body through an emphasis on process and materials.’ Lippard referred to eccentric abstraction as a “non-sculptural style,” which was closer to abstract painting than to sculpture.

Lucy Lippard was a member of the populist political artist group known as the Art Workers Coalition, or AWC, which was founded in New York City in 1969. Her involvement in the AWC as well as a trip she took to Argentina—such trips bolstered the political motivations of many feminists of the time—influenced a change in the focus of her criticism, from formalist subjects to more feministic ones. Lucy Lippard is also believed to be a co-founder of West-East Bag, an international women artist network which was founded in 1971, in the early beginnings of the feminist art movement in the United States. Their newsletter W.E.B. mentioned tactics used against museums to protest the lack of female representation in museum collections and exhibitions. The group was dissolved in 1973.

In 1975, Lippard traveled to Australia and spoke to groups of women artists in Melbourne and Adelaide about the creation of archives of women artists' work on photographic slides, known as slide registers, by West-East Bag, the idea being to counteract their lack of showings in art galleries. Lippard was a major influence in the establishment of the Women's Art Movement in Australia, and developed a friendship with leading proponent Vivienne Binns, who later visited New York.

In 1976, Lucy Lippard published a monographic work on the sculptor Eva Hesse combining biography and criticism, formal analysis and psychological readings to tell the story of her life and career. The book was designed by Hesse’s friend and colleague, Sol LeWitt. Each of her seventy sculptures and many of her drawings are reproduced and discussed within the book. Being a long-time friend of Hesse, Lippard treads a fine line between public and private life. She writes about the achievements and many struggles in Hesse’s life that had an impact on who she was as a person. Eva Hesse was born in 1936, in Germany, but because of her Jewish upbringing she and her family were forced to flee from the Nazi regime in 1938, arriving in New York in 1939. During their flight, Hesse’s father kept diaries of the journey for each of the children, a habit Hesse returned to later in her life. In these diaries she talked about the struggles in her life. Hesse is an American artist known for her innovative use of materials in her sculptures, such as fiberglass, latex and plastics. This innovative use of ‘soft’ materials has become an inspiration source for a younger generation of women artists. Lippard further writes that although Hesse died before feminism affected the art world, she was well aware of the manner in which her experience as a woman altered her art and her career. In writing this important work on Eva Hesse, Lucy Lippard has tapped into her knowledge of and passion for feminism, particularly within the art world. Although the book is long out-of-print, this classic text remains both an insightful critical analysis and a tribute to an important female artist ‘whose genius has become increasingly apparent with the passage of time.’

Since 1966, Lippard has written thirty books on feminism, art, politics, and place, as well as a novel and experimental works in fiction and autobiography. She has received numerous awards and accolades from literary critics and art associations. A 2012 exhibition on her seminal book, Six Years: The Dematerialization of the Art Object at the Brooklyn Museum, titled "Six Years": Lucy R. Lippard and the Emergence of Conceptual Art", cites Lippard's scholarship as its point of entry into a discussion about conceptual art during its era of emergence, demonstrating her crucial role in the contemporary understanding of this period of art production and criticism.

Co-founder of Printed Matter, Inc (an art bookstore in New York City centered on artist's books), the Heresies Collective, Political Art Documentation/Distribution (PAD/D), Artists Call Against U.S. Intervention in Central America, and other artists' organizations, she has also curated over 50 exhibitions, made performances, comics, guerrilla theater, and edited several independent publications, including El Puente, a monthly community newsletter, from her home in Galisteo, New Mexico, where she moved in the early 1990s. She has infused aesthetics with politics, and disdained disinterestedness for ethical activism.

She was interviewed for the film !Women Art Revolution.

In 2023, she published a pictorial autobiography, Stuff: Instead of a Memoir. On this occasion, The New York Review of Books described Lippard as "a canonical figure who held no truck with canons, who disdained art history only to become art history.”

== Honors and awards ==
Lippard holds nine honorary doctorates of fine arts, some of which are listed below.

- 2024: Susan C. Larsen Lifetime Achievement Award for Visual Arts and Writing, The Dorothea and Leo Rabkin Foundation
- 2024: Mayor's Art Award, City of Santa Fe
- 2015: Distinguished Lifetime Achievement Award for Writing on Art, College Art Association
- 2013: Honorary doctorate, Otis College of Art and Design
- 2013: Distinguished critic lecture, International Association of Art Critics, United States
- 2012: Distinguished Feminist Award, College Art Association
- 2010: Award for Curatorial Excellence, Center for Curatorial Studies, Bard College
- 2007: Honorary Doctor of Fine Arts, honoris causa, Nova Scotia College of Art and Design (NSCAD University)
- 1976: National Endowment for the Arts grant
- 1975: Frank Jewett Mather Award for Criticism, College Art Association
- 1972: National Endowment for the Arts grant
- 1968: Guggenheim Fellowship

== Exhibitions ==
- 1966, Eccentric Abstraction, Fischbach Gallery, New York City, New York
- 1967–1968, Rejective Art, organized by the American Federation of Arts, New York City, New York; traveled to three US venues
- 1969, Number 7, Paula Cooper Gallery, New York City, New York
- September 1969, 557,087, Seattle World's Fair Pavilion, Seattle, Washington
- 1970, 955,000, Vancouver Art Gallery, Vancouver, Canada
- 1971, 2,972,453, Centro de Arte y Communicación, Buenos Aires, Argentina
- 1973–1974, c.7,500, CalArts, Valencia, California; traveling throughout US and Europe
- 2025-2026, Notes from the Radical Whirlwind, Vladem Contemporary Museum, Santa Fe, New Mexico

== Publications ==
- Headwaters and other Short Fictions. Los Angeles: New Documents. 2025 ISBN 9781953441041
- Lucy R. Lippard on Pop Art. London: Thames and Hudson. 2024. ISBN 978-0500028674
- Moving Targets: Feminist Essays on Women's Art 1970-1993. Herzogenrath, Germany:Seidelman & Company [Editions Moustache]. 2024. ISBN 396034998X
- Stuff: Instead of a Memoir. New York: New Village Press. 2023. ISBN 9781613322246
- Mokha Laget: Perceptualism. Washington, D.C.: American University Museum. 2022. OCLC 1367327305
- Pueblo Chico. Santa Fe: Museum of New Mexico Press. 2020.ISBN 978-0-89013-649-2
- Undermining: A Wild Ride Through Land Use, Politics, and Art in the Changing West. New York: The New Press. 2014. ISBN 9781595586193
- Time and Time Again: History, Rephotography, and Preservation in the Chaco World. With Peter Goin, photographer. Santa Fe: University of New Mexico Press. 2013. ISBN 978-0890135778
- 4,492,040. Los Angeles: New Documents. 2012. ISBN 9781927354001
- Down Country: The Tano of the Galisteo Basin, 1250-1782. With Edward Ranney, photographer. Santa Fe: Museum of New Mexico Press. ISBN 978-0890135662
- Weather Report. Boulder, C.O.: Boulder Museum of Contemporary Arts. 2007. ISBN 0979900700
- On the beaten track: tourism, art and place. New York: New Press. 1999. ISBN 1565844548
- The Lure of the Local: Senses of Place in a Multicentered Society. New York: New Press. 1998. ISBN 1565842480
- The Pink Glass Swan. New York: New Press, 1995. ISBN 1565842138
- Mixed blessings: new art in a multicultural America. New York: Pantheon Books. 1990. ISBN 0394577590
- A different war: Vietnam in art. Bellingham, Wash: Whatcom Museum of History and Art. 1990. ISBN 0941104435
- "Trojan Horses: Activist Art and Power." Art After Modernism: Rethinking Representation, edited by Brian Wallis. Boston, M.A.: David R. Godine. 1985. ISBN 0879235632
- Get the message?: a decade of art for social change. New York: E.P. Dutton. 1984 ISBN 0525480374
- Overlay: contemporary art and the art of prehistory. New York: Pantheon Books. 1983 ISBN 0394518128
- I See / You Mean. Los Angeles: Chrysalis Books. 1979. Reprint, Los Angeles: New Documents. 2021. ISBN 9781953441034
- Eva Hesse. New York: New York University Press. 1976.
- From the center: feminist essays on women's art. New York: Dutton. 1976.ISBN 0525474277
- Six years: the dematerialization of the art object from 1966 to 1972; a cross-reference book of information on some esthetic boundaries. New York: Praeger. 1973. ISBN 0289703328
- Changing: essays in art criticism. New York: Dutton. 1971.ISBN 0525079424
- Surrealists on art. Englewood Cliffs, N.J.: Prentice-Hall. 1970. ISBN 0138780900
- Pop art. New York: Praeger. 1966.
- The Graphic Work of Philip Evergood. New York: Crown, 1966.

== See also ==
- Women in the art history field
- Feminist art
