= Polytantric Circle =

UK Stonehenge Free Festival organizers

The Polytantric Circle was an organization that helped organize the yearly summer solstice celebrations at Stonehenge, England. These celebrations, called the Stonehenge Free Festival, ran from 1974 to 1984.

By the early 1980s, the festival had begun to attract a large following, and the people who helped to put the festival together year after year began to take on specific roles. Willy X put together an annual festival list and had contact lists for bands, and the loose-knit Polytantric, an offshoot of the White Panthers, took the lead in organising the stage and pyramid roof, PA, and bands. Nik Turner of Hawkwind offered valuable experience in use of setting up of the pyramid, a free alternative space, a legendary stage, which had originally made its debut with Sphinx at the Edinburgh festival Greenham, Sizewell, Stonehenge, Hyde Park. Brixton.

Stonehenge begun to grow rapidly: in 1980, 12,000 people had attended, but by '82 there were 35,000. However, coordination between English Heritage, the National Trust, and the Polytantric Circle seemed to be breaking down.

In 1983 it was decided to move the stage to the field closer to the woods and further away from the Stones. Sid Rawle and Big Steve the polytantric stage manager wandered across the fields past the mounds clutching a dowsing rod; it twitched downwards in a circle of daisies, the spot that was to become the site for the stage for the pyramid stage at the Stonehenge free festival. Six days and six nights of live music followed.

In 1985 celebrations at Stonehenge were banned by English courts. However, this ban was lifted in 1999 and the campaign for a new free festival summer solstice celebration still continues.

The group published "The Polytantric Newsletter" and were the first to organise what became The Stonehenge Campaign.
