= Q and R Holes =

Sockets on stones

Coordinates: 51°10′43.84″N 1°49′34.28″W

Fig.1 The Q and R Holes in relation to the early earthwork

The Q and R Holes are a series of concentric sockets which currently represent the earliest known evidence for a stone structure on the site of Stonehenge.

Beneath the turf and just inside the later Sarsen Circle is a double arc of buried stoneholes, the only surviving evidence of the first stone structure (possibly a double stone circle) erected within the centre of Stonehenge (Figs.1 & 2) and currently regarded as instigating the period known as Stonehenge Phase 3i. This phase may have begun as early as 2600 BC, although recent radiocarbon dates from samples retrieved from one of the sockets in 2008 during excavations by Darvill and Wainwright suggest a date of around 2400 to 2300 BC. They made a partial excavation of Q Hole 13, where 'associations with Beaker pottery' were noted.

Although first encountered by William Hawley in the 1920s, it was Richard Atkinson who formally identified and named these irregular settings in 1954: "In choosing this designation, I had in mind John Aubrey’s frequent use, as a marginal note…of the phrase 'quaere quot' – 'inquire how many' – which seemed appropriate to the occasion". Their place at the beginning of the stone monument phase has been recognized from their stratigraphic relationships: in places they were cut through by both the settings of the later and still partly surviving Bluestone Circle, and also by a stonehole dug for one of the uprights of the Sarsen Circle.

Fig.2 The Q and R Holes in relation to the later stone monument

== Description ==
The diameter of the outer (Q) circuit is c. 26.2 m and that of the inner (R) is, 22.5 m; with an average spacing between the paired stone settings of 1.5 m. These trench-like intrusions are roughly 2 m long and 1 m wide, set radially and slightly enlarged at each end to provide paired stone sockets to a depth of around 0.6 m, the intervening strip generally re-filled with chalk rubble.

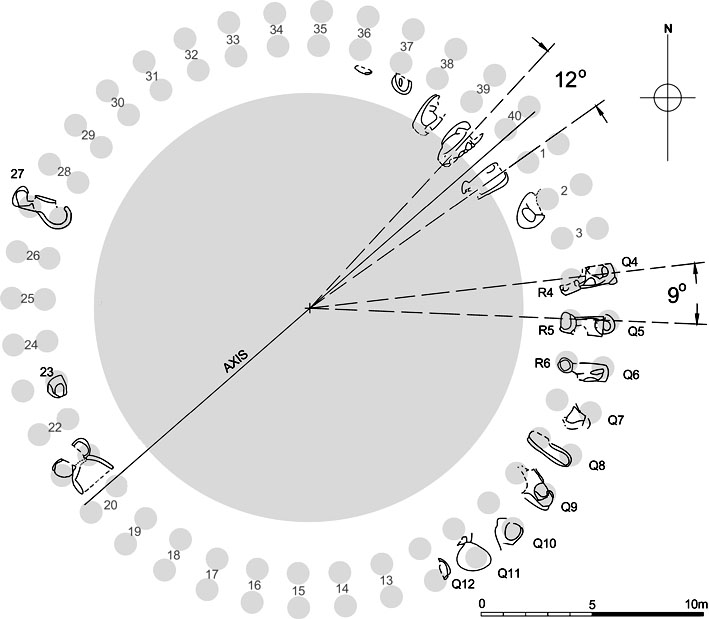
Fig.3 The Q and R Holes, possibly 40 paired settings. The Stonehenge axis was established when the inset 'portal settings' were added on the northeast (after Johnson 2008)

Atkinson described them as being ‘dumb-bell’ shaped, although not all were of this form. The bases of some sockets bore "the impressions…of heavy stones" some with "minute chips of dolerite [i.e. bluestone] embedded". While this does not imply that only bluestones were used in the Q and R structure, he found no evidence for sarsens. His accounts make it clear that he believed the sockets to have exclusively held bluestones "presumably the same stones that are still at Stonehenge".

== Interpretation ==
Atkinson estimated that if the Q and R Holes originally formed a complete circle that 38 pairs would have been present, although recent computer-modelling shows that there is room for 40.

The Q and R Holes not only represent the foundation cuts for the first central stone construction, but they also were to include several additional stone settings on the northeast. This modified group face the midsummer sunrise with a possible reciprocal stone aligned on the midwinter sunset. This is the first evidence for any unambiguous alignment at Stonehenge (the solstice axis). The analysis of the spacing between the Q and R array, and that of the modified (inset) portal group (Fig.3) imply a shift from an angular splay of 9 degrees (i.e. 40 settings) to 12 degrees, the same as that of the later 30 Sarsen Circle.

How long the bluestones remained in the Q and R settings before they were removed (if indeed this early structure was ever completed) is not known. However, the dates suggested from the 2008 excavation imply the Q & R arrays were perhaps no earlier than 2400 BC, presenting a challenge to the recently accepted Late Neolithic date for the construction of the iconic sarsen monument.
