= West Woods =

Forest near Marlborough, Wiltshire

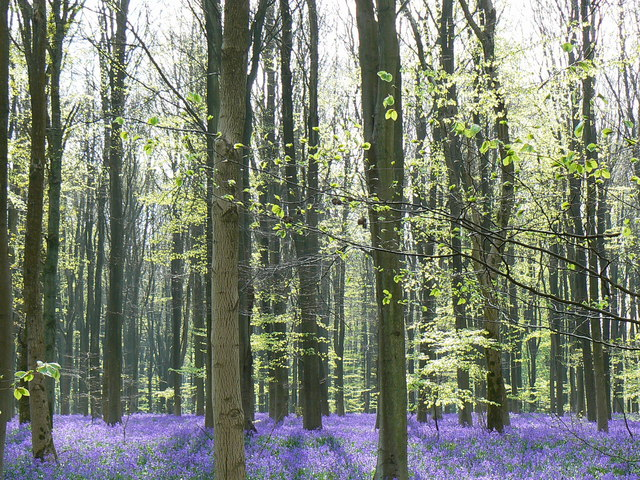
- Interactive map of West Woods

Geography
- Location: Marlborough, Wiltshire, United Kingdom
- Coordinates: 51°23′47″N 1°46′36″W
- Area: 957 acres (387 ha)

West Woods is a wood about 2 1/2 miles (4 km) southwest of the market town of Marlborough in the English county of Wiltshire, United Kingdom. Its area is approximately 957 acres (387 ha). It is open to the public, and is popular with visitors in the Spring, when bluebells cover the forest floor.

== History ==
West Woods was once part of the Royal hunting forest of Savernake until the bounds were changed in the 1330s. West Woods is approximately one fifth of the size of Savernake and was clear felled in 1928 then replanted, mainly with beech. The woods have been visited since before the Bronze Age, supplying flints and later charcoal facilities.

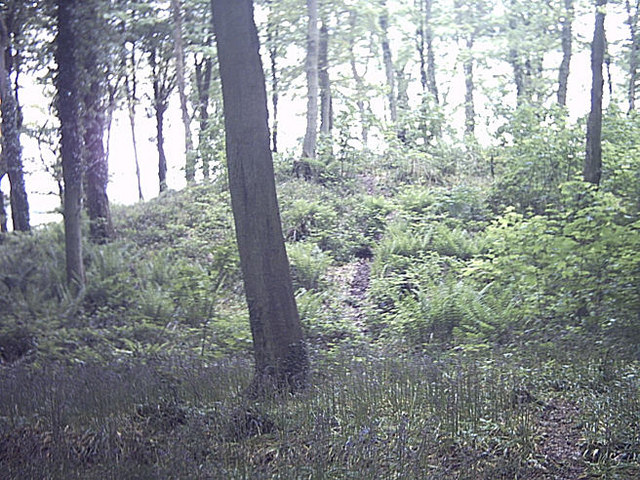
West Woods long barrow

== Archaeological link to Stonehenge ==
In July 2020, it was announced that West Woods was the most likely origin of most of the sarsen stones used to build the outer circle and central trilithon horseshoe at Stonehenge. Archaeologists and geochemists analysed a core drilled from one of the upright sarsen stones at Stonehenge in 1958, and compared it to samples from 20 sarsen outcrops around the country. The chemistry of samples from the core yielded a unique match with sarsen samples from West Woods.

The whereabouts of the core had been unknown until it was returned from the United States by Englishman Robert Phillips in 2018.

West Woods also contains a Neolithic long barrow, approximately 40 metres (130 ft) long and 27 metres (89 ft) wide at the widest point, up to 3.5 metres (11 ft) high, and surrounded by a ditch on all sides. The wood is bisected by an ancient earthwork known as the Wansdyke, dating back to the 5th or 6th century BC.

In February 2007 the Wiltshire Archaeological and Natural History Society conducted the first of a series of surveys which revealed considerable detail about West Wood and the surrounding areas, producing evidence covering a range of time periods including Mesolithic, Neolithic, and post-Medieval. The report discusses the findings of four seasons' worth of field work and includes maps and tables of discoveries.
