= Laser scanning at Stonehenge =

The first use of 3D laser scanning at Stonehenge was of the Bronze Age dagger and axes inscribed on the sarsens, which was undertaken in 2002 by a team from Wessex Archaeology and Archaeoptics. They used a Minolta Vivid 900 scanner to analyse and record surfaces of the prehistoric and post-medieval carvings.

The Bronze Age carvings of a dagger and an axehead were first discovered by archaeologist Richard J. C. Atkinson in 1953 on stone number 53, one of the imposing sarsen trilithons. A contemporary survey in 1956 by Robert Newall revealed that the total number of axes on this stone totalled 14, all on the same face of the stone, looking inwards to the centre of the stone circle. Typologically, the axes have a Middle Bronze Age date.

The surface of stone 53 containing Bronze Age carvings was laser scanned at a resolution of 0.5mm, resulting in hundreds of thousands of individual 3D measurements known as a point cloud. These data were then processed into a meshed 3D solid model for analysis using custom software written by Archaeoptics called Demon3D.

The team pioneered some visualisation techniques to enhance the outlines of the known carvings. During this process, the faint outline of two previously unknown axes was spotted in an animation, separate from the carvings recorded by Newall. Subsequent enhancement of the data confirmed that the shapes were of flanged axes, similar in shape to those clearly visible, but either badly eroded, or were originally carved much shallower than their counterparts. The larger of the two carvings differs slightly from the other axes in that it has two 'lugs' along its shaft, and others have interpreted that it could represent either an axe, a mushroom, or a ram's skull.

The results of these investigations were published in an article entitled "The Stonehenge Laser Show" in the November 2003 edition of British Archaeology.

In 2011 English Heritage commissioned a full laser scan of the visible faces of all stones as Stonehenge in high resolution (sub-millimetre), as well as a lower resolution scan of the ground in the area known as the "Stonehenge Triangle".
