= Julian Thomas =

British archaeologist

- Occupation: Professor of Archaeology

Academic background
- Education: Sheffield University; Bradford University
- Thesis: Relations of power : the Neolithic of central south-west England. (1986)
- Doctoral advisor: Andrew Fleming

Academic work
- Discipline: Archaeology
- Sub-discipline: Neolithic Archaeology Archaeological Theory
- Institutions: Manchester University; Southampton University
- Notable students: Christopher J. Fowler
- Main interests: Neolithic Archaeology Archaeological Theory
- Website: https://research.manchester.ac.uk/en/persons/julian.thomas

Julian Stewart Thomas FSA (born 1959) is a British archaeologist, publishing on the Neolithic and Bronze Age prehistory of Britain and north-west Europe. Thomas has been vice president of the Royal Anthropological Institute since 2007. He has been Professor of Archaeology at the University of Manchester since 2000, and is former secretary of the World Archaeological Congress. Thomas is perhaps best known as the author of the academic publication Understanding the Neolithic in particular, and for his work with the Stonehenge Riverside Project.

== Education ==
Born in Epsom, Surrey, Thomas studied archaeology at the University of Bradford, where he acquired a Bachelor of Technology (BTech) degree in archaeological science in 1981. He then transferred to the University of Sheffield and graduated with a Master of Arts (MA) degree in 1982, and a Doctor of Philosophy (PhD) degree in 1986 for his research on the "social and economic change in the Neolithic of Wessex and the Upper Thames valley".

== Career ==
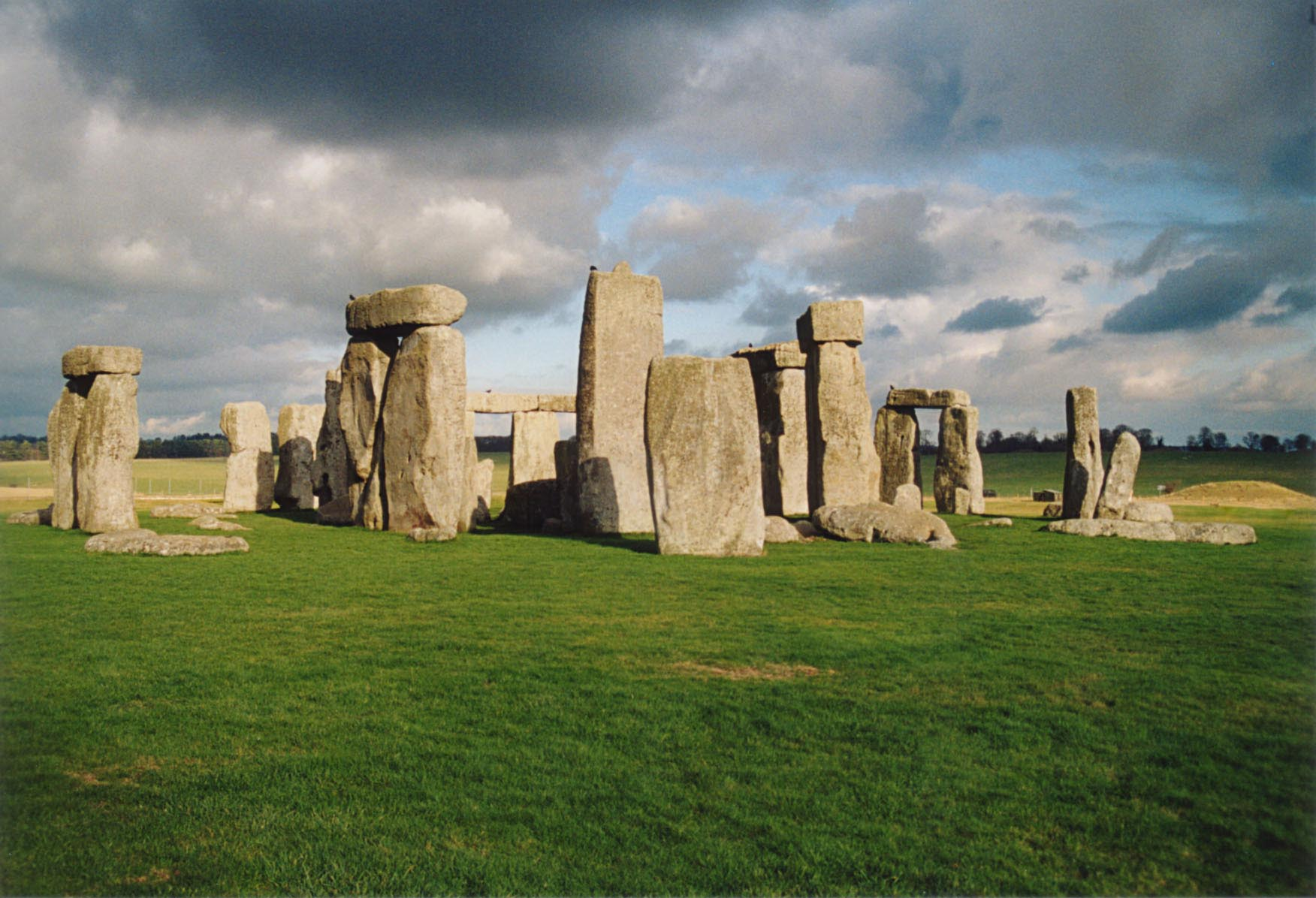
Stonehenge A UNESCO World Heritage Site and part of the Stonehenge Riverside Project

Between 1987 and 2000 Thomas was a lecturer in archaeology at the University of Wales, Lampeter (1987–1993) and at Southampton University (1994–2000). Thomas worked with Historic Scotland between 1994 and 2002, excavating prehistoric sites in Dumfries and Galloway as "Director of archaeological excavations of Neolithic and later prehistoric sites" – the record of which was published as Place and Memory: Excavations at the Pict's Knowe, Holywood and Holm Farm in 2007.

Originally published as Rethinking the Neolithic in 1991, Thomas revised his work, which was republished as Understanding the Neolithic in 1999. The book challenged the conventionally held view that human lifestyles transformed in Great Britain, from Mesolithic hunter-gatherers to Neolithic farmers – a process known as the "Neolithic Revolution"– through interpretive analysis of "social theory, anthropology and critical hermeneutics". He was one of the academics to develop the framework of performance archaeology.

Between 1994 and 1999 Thomas was secretary of the World Archaeological Congress and became academic series editor (a pro bono (unpaid) position held jointly with Martin Hall) of the Routledge series Themes in Archaeology – which moved to Left Coast Press as the One World Archaeology Series in 2008. Ten books in the series were published during their tenure – between 2000 and 2005.

Thomas took up the Chair of Archaeology at Manchester University in April 2000, a position he still holds.

Thomas is co-director of the Stonehenge Riverside Project – a collaborative archaeological study begun in 2003 as a consortium of university teams, funded by the AHRC and the National Geographic Society. During excavations of sites surrounding Stonehenge – including Stonehenge Cursus, the Avenue and Woodhenge – Thomas found evidence of a large settlement of Neolithic houses, at Durrington Walls, nearby and discovered the prehistoric henge and stone circle, known as "Bluestonehenge", on the west bank of the Avon. Thomas speculates that the 25 bluestones at Stonehenge – originating in the Preseli Hills, 250 kilometres (160 mi) away in modern-day Pembrokeshire, Wales – stood in a circle, surrounded by a henge, at Bluestonehenge for around 500 years before being dismantled and moved to their current location around 2500 BCE.

Thomas has been Vice President of the Royal Anthropological Institute since his election in 2007 and is a Fellow of the Society of Antiquaries of London (also since 2007).

Thomas is married to Catherine, and has two daughters and two step-daughters.

== Publications ==
=== Sole author ===
1. Rethinking the Neolithic (1991), revised and republished as Understanding the Neolithic (1999)
2. Time, Culture and Identity: An Interpretive Archaeology (1998)
3. Archaeology and Modernity (2004)

=== Co–author ===
1. Writing the past in the present (1990) by Frederick Baker, Julian Thomas
2. Anglesey archaeological landscape project: second interim report 1991 (1992) by Mark Edmonds, Julian Thomas, Matthew Johnson, St. David's University College, (Lampeter, Wales), Department of Archaeology
3. Place and Memory: Excavations at the Pict's Knowe, Holywood and Holm Farm by Julian Thomas, Matt Leivers, Julia Roberts, Rick Peterson
4. Overcoming the modern invention of material culture: proceedings of the TAG session, Exeter 2006 (2007) by Vítor Oliveira Jorge, Julian Thomas, Theoretical Archaeology Group (England). Conference

=== Editor or co–editor ===
1. Interpretive archaeology: a reader (2000), edited by Julian Thomas
2. Destruction and conservation of cultural property (2001), edited by Robert Layton, Julian Thomas, Peter G. Stone
3. Neolithic enclosures in Atlantic northwest Europe (2001), edited by Timothy Darvill, Julian Thomas
4. Handbook of landscape archaeology (2008), edited by Bruno David, Julian Thomas

=== Chapters in books ===
1. 'Some Problems with the Notion of External Symbolic Storage, and the case of Neolithic Material Culture in Britain', Cognition and Culture: The Archaeology of External Symbolic Storage (1998)
2. 'The identity of place in Neolithic Britain: examples from south-west Scotland', Neolithic Orkney in its European Context (2000)
3. 'Reconfiguring the social, reconfiguring the material', Social Theory in Archaeology (2000)
4. 'Intersecting landscapes', Contested Landscapes: Movement, Exile and Place (2001)
5. 'Archaeologies of Place and Landscape', Archaeological Theory Today (2001)
6. 'Taking power seriously', The Dynamics of Power (2002)
7. 'Archaeology's humanism and the materiality of the body', Thinking Through the Body (2002)
8. 'In the Kinship of Cows: the Social Centrality of Cattle in the Earlier Neolithic of Southern Britain', Food, Culture and Identity in the Neolithic and Early Bronze Age (2003)
9. 'The ritual universe', Scotland in Ancient Europe (2004)
10. 'The later Neolithic architectural repertoire: the case of the Dunragit complex', Monuments and Material Culture: Papers on Neolithic and Bronze Age Britain in Honour of Isobel Smith (2004)
11. 'The great dark book: archaeology, experience and interpretation', A Companion to Archaeology (2004)
12. 'Notions of the person', Archaeology: The Key Concepts (2004)
13. 'Materiality, authenticity, and skilled engagement: a commentary', Archaeology and Performance (2004)
14. 'Materiality and traditions of practice in Neolithic south-west Scotland', The Neolithic of the Irish Sea: Materiality and Traditions of Practice (2004)
15. 'Identity, power and material culture in Neolithic Britain', Cultural Diversity and the Archaeology of the 21st Century (2004)
16. 'Archaeology, modernity and society', Cultural Diversity and the Archaeology of the 21st Century (2004)
17. 'Materiality and the social', Global Archaeological Theory: Contextual Voices and Contemporary Thoughts (2005)
18. 'Ceremonies of the horsemen? From megalithic tombs to Beaker burials in prehistoric Europe', Bell Beakers in the Iberian Peninsula and Their European Context (2005)
19. 'Phenomenology and material culture', Handbook of Material Culture (2006)
20. 'The Mesolithic-Neolithic transition in Britain', Prehistoric Britain (2008)
21. 'Archaeology, landscape and dwelling', Handbook of Landscape Archaeology (2008)
22. 'Sigmund Freud's Archaeological Metaphor and Archaeology's Self-understanding', Contemporary Archaeologies: Excavating Now (2009)

=== Journal articles ===
1. "Silent running: the ills of environmental archaeology", Scottish Archaeological Review (1990)
2. "The socio-semiotics of material culture", Journal of Material Culture (1998)
3. "Death, identity and the body in Neolithic Britain", Journal of the Royal Anthropological Institute (2000)
4. "Thoughts on the 'repacked? Neolithic revolution' ", Antiquity (2003)
5. "Recent debates on the Mesolithic-Neolithic transition in Britain and Ireland", Documenta Praehistorica (2004)
6. "Archaeology's place in modernity", Modernism/Modernity (2004)
7. "Between 'material qualities' and 'materiality' " Archaeometry (2005)
8. "Ambiguous symbols: why there were no figurines in Neolithic Britain", Documenta Prehistorica (2005)
9. "On the origins and development of cursus monuments in Britain", Proceedings of the Prehistoric Society (2006)
10. "Gene-flows and social processes: the potential of genetics and archaeology", Documenta Prehistorica (2006)
11. "From dwelling to building", Journal of Iberian Archaeology (2006)
12. "A reply to Christopher Witmore, Håkon Glørstad, Søren Kjørup and Ola W. Jensen", Norwegian Archaeological Review (2006)
13. "The trouble with material culture", Journal of Iberian Archaeology (2007)
14. "Mesolithic-Neolithic transitions in Britain: from essence to inhabitation", Proceedings of the British Academy (2007)
15. "Comments on ‘Past Practices: Rethinking Individuals and Agents in Archaeology’ by A. B. Knapp and P. van Dommelen", Cambridge Archaeological Journal (2008)

=== Other ===
1. Proposals for a tunnel at Stonehenge: an assessment of the alternatives (1999), report to the World Archaeological Congress Executive by Robert Layton and Julian Thomas.
