= Arts and Humanities Research Council =

British research council

Council overview
- Formed: 1998; 28 years ago
- Status: Council within UK Research and Innovation
- Headquarters: Swindon, Wiltshire, England
- Annual budget: £77 million (FY2024/25)
- Ministers responsible: Liz Kendall MP, Secretary of State for Science, Innovation and Technology; Patrick Vallance, Minister of State for Science, Research and Innovation
- Council executive: Professor Christopher Smith, Executive Chair
- Parent department: Department for Science, Innovation and Technology
- Parent body: UK Research and Innovation
- Website: ahrc.ukri.org

The Arts and Humanities Research Council (AHRC) is a council of UK Research and Innovation (UKRI), a non-departmental public body sponsored by the Department for Science, Innovation and Technology, responsible for supporting research and innovation in the arts and humanities.

== History ==
AHRC was founded as the Arts and Humanities Research Board (AHRB) in 1998 and became a Research Council in April 2005.

== Description ==
The AHRC provides approximately £102 million from the UK government to support research and postgraduate study in the arts and humanities, from languages and law, archaeology and English literature to design and creative and performing arts. In any one year, the AHRC makes approximately 700 research awards and around 1,350 postgraduate awards. Postgraduate funding is organised through Doctoral Training Partnerships in 10 consortia that bring together a total of 72 higher education institutions throughout the UK. Awards are made after a rigorous peer review process, to ensure that only applications of the highest quality are funded.

== Governance ==
AHRC is a council of UK Research and Innovation, a non-departmental public body sponsored by the Department for Science, Innovation and Technology.

Professor Christopher Smith is the current Executive Chair of the AHRC. He succeeded Professor Andrew S. Thompson who served as Interim Chief Executive from December 2015 until August 2020. His predecessor was Professor Rick Rylance who took up the post on 1 September 2009 and served until August 2017.

The current Council Chair is Sir Drummond Bone who succeeded Sir Alan Wilson who retired in December 2013.

== Recently funded research ==
=== The London Project (2004–05) ===
The London Project (2004–05) (Centre for British Film and Television Studies), investigating the film business in London 1894–1914, was led by Ian Christie, with Simon Brown (Businesses) and Luke McKernan (Venues).

=== Stonehenge Riverside Project (2009–14) ===
The Stonehenge Riverside Project was a major five-year AHRC-funded archaeological research study, announced in 2009, focusing on the development of the Stonehenge landscape in Neolithic and Bronze Age Britain. In particular, the project was interested in the relationship between the stones and surrounding monuments and features including; the River Avon, Durrington Walls, the Cursus, the Avenue, Woodhenge, burial mounds, and nearby standing stones. In August 2009 the project discovered a new stone circle, which was named Bluestonehenge by the research team, about one mile away from Stonehenge in Wiltshire, England. The project is run by a consortium of university teams. It was directed by Mike Parker Pearson of Sheffield University, with co-directors Josh Pollard (University of Southampton), Julian Thomas (Manchester University), Kate Welham (Bournemouth University) and Colin Richards (Manchester University).

=== Medieval Soldier Database ===
Researchers at the University of Reading and University of Southampton analysed historic sources such as muster rolls records in the National Archives at Kew and the Bibliothèque nationale de France in Paris (for records of English garrisons in France). The resulting Medieval Soldier online database was launched in 2009 which enables people to search for soldiers by surname, rank or year of service. The online database contains 250,000 service records of soldiers who saw active duty in the latter phases of the Hundred Years' War (1369–1453).

=== British slave-ownership (2013–15) ===
Between 2013 and 2015, the AHRC co-funded a project known as the Structure and significance of British Caribbean slave-ownership 1763-1833 project at the Centre for the Study of the Legacies of British Slave-ownership, along with the Economic and Social Research Council. This work continues to be built upon, creating Legacies of British Slave-ownership database, which is free for public use.

=== Heritage in War ===
A project funded by AHRC looking at the circumstances in which belligerent parties in wars may intentionally or foreseeably damage sites of cultural property.

=== Old Bailey Proceedings Archive ===
An AHRC research grant enabled academics from the University of Hertfordshire, University of Sheffield and the Open University to double in size the Old Bailey trial proceedings available to view on the Old Bailey Proceedings Online website and provide access to the largest single source of searchable information about ordinary British lives and behaviour ever published.

The Old Bailey Proceedings Online makes available a fully searchable, digitised collection of all surviving editions of the Old Bailey Proceedings from 1674 to 1913, and of the Ordinary of Newgate's Accounts, 1679 to 1772. It allows access to over 197,000 trials and biographical details of approximately 2,500 men and women executed at Tyburn.

== Publications ==
The AHRC publish reviews and reports on arts and humanities subjects, as well as corporate publications. Research news and findings are communicated in website features, press releases, and multimedia content such as podcasts.

Between 2005 and 2010, the AHRC published a magazine called Podium twice a year, which contained news and case studies based on research that they have funded.
