= Bluestonehenge =

Prehistoric monument in Wiltshire, England

- West Amesbury Henge
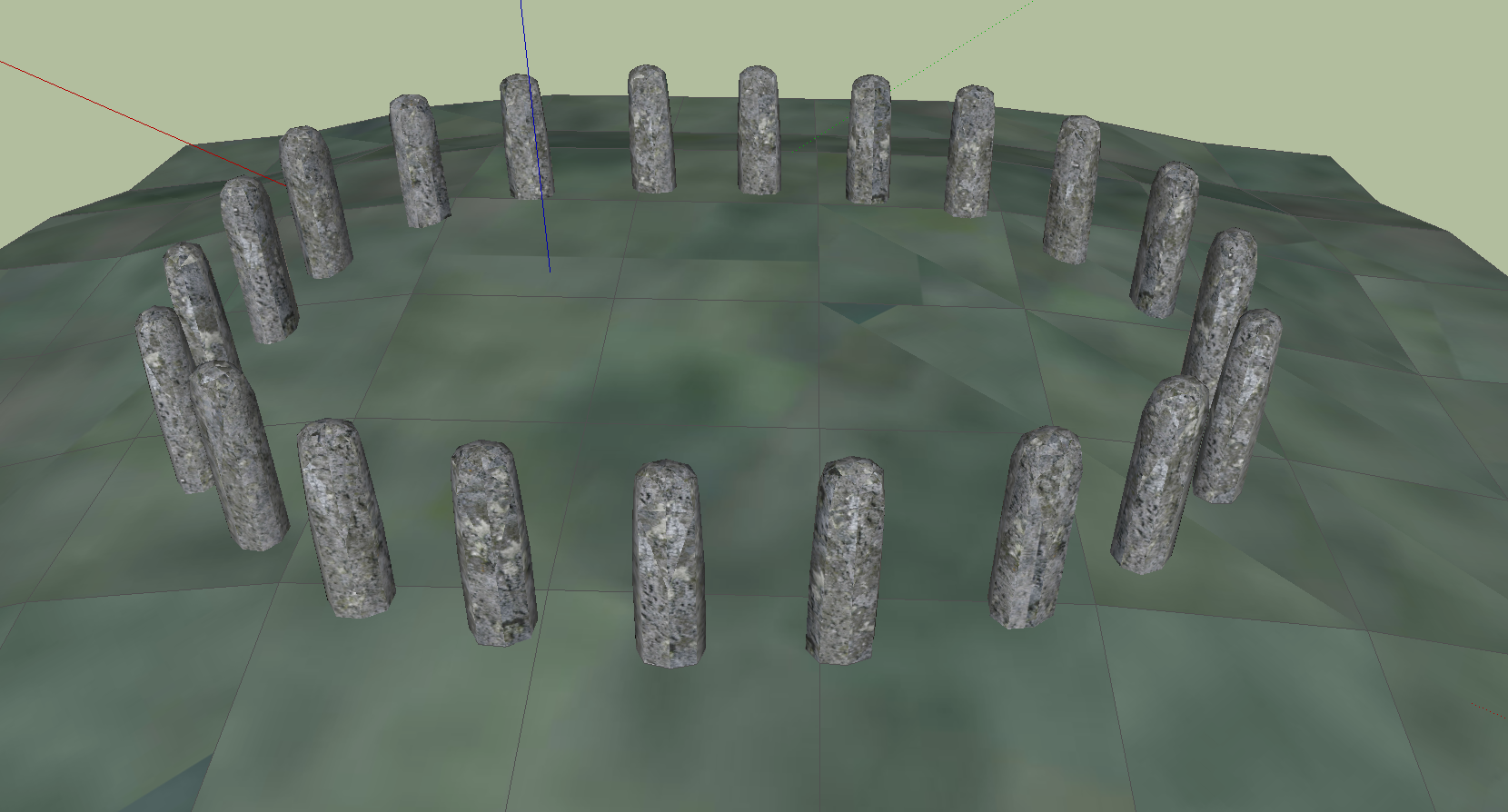
- Bluestonehenge digital reconstruction – oval configuration

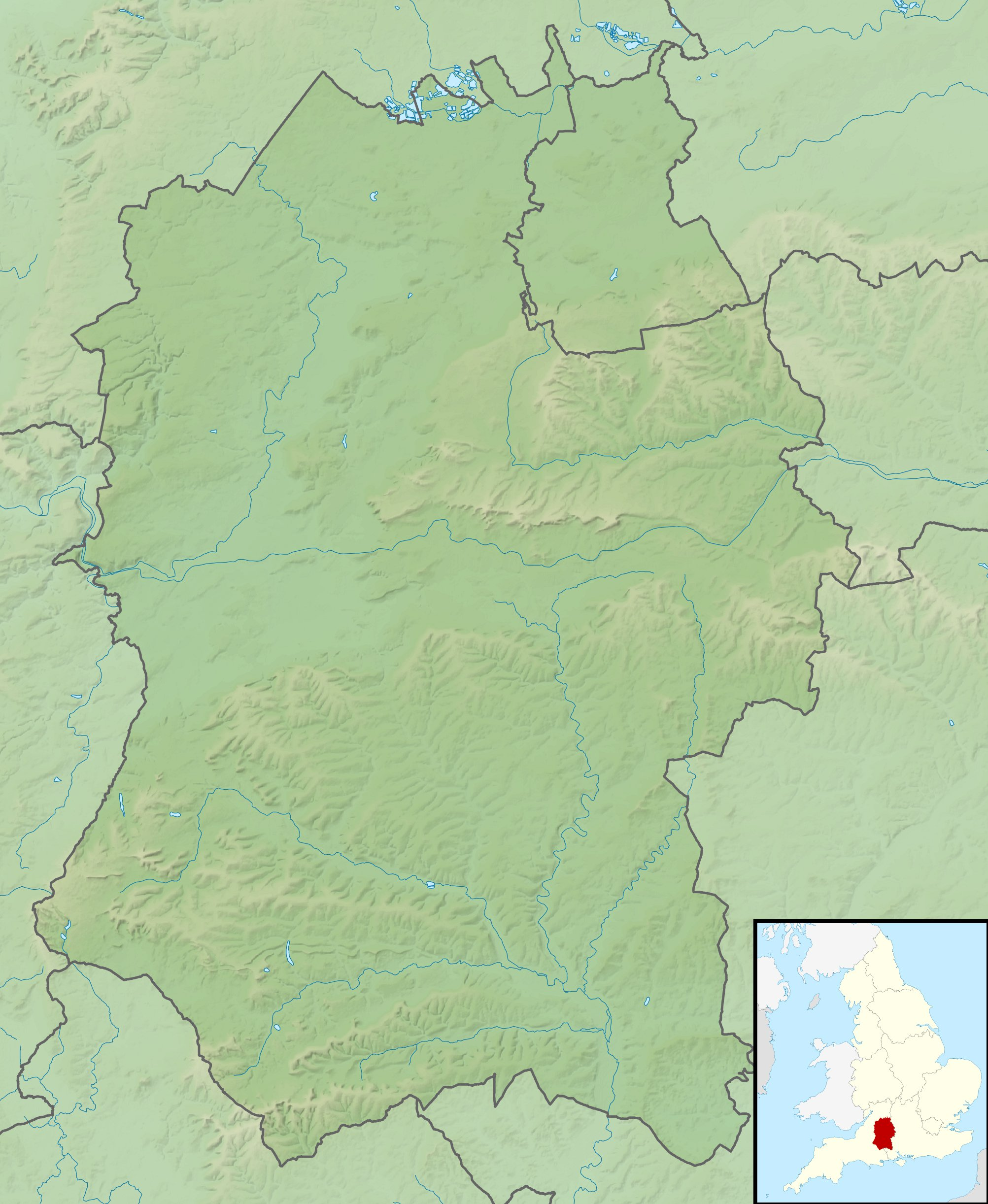
- Map showing Bluestonehenge's location
- 51.1714°N 1.7980°W
- Location: Wiltshire, England

Bluestonehenge or Bluehenge (also known as West Amesbury Henge) is a prehistoric henge and stone circle monument that was discovered by the Stonehenge Riverside Project about 1 mile (1.6 km) south-east of Stonehenge in Wiltshire, England. All that remains of the site is the ditch of the henge and a series of stone settings, none of which is visible above ground.

== Excavations ==
The site was excavated in August 2008 and again in August 2009; it is considered to be an important find by archaeologists. Full details of the discovery were published in the 2010 January / February edition of British Archaeology.

Mike Parker Pearson and his team of researchers played a key role in the discovery of this new henge site along the River Avon that links to Stonehenge. This new site was uncovered through excavation during the Stonehenge Riverside Project; it was given the name "Bluestonehenge" or "Bluehenge" because traces of bluestones were found during the excavation.

The term “henge” is often incorrectly thought to mean a circular structure of stones. In fact, henge in archaeology refers to an enclosed structure made of compressed earth, containing a ditch on the inside of the bank, giving the perception of keeping something inside the enclosure, rather than keeping out others. Stonehenge may be improperly named, according to the original archeological definition, as its ditch is located on the outside of the bank.

== Initial findings ==
The monument has been tentatively dated to between about 3000 and 2400 BC. Radiocarbon dating of antler tools found at the site has provided only an approximate date of 2469 to 2286 BC for the dismantling of the stones. Tests on an antler pick found at the bottom of a stonehole have so far failed, due to inadequate collagen in the sample.

Excavation revealed several stone settings that are thought to have been erected some time between 3400 and 2500 BC, due to two flint chisel arrowheads being found that are in a style commonly used during that period. It is estimated that there may have been as many as 27 stones in a circle 33 feet (10 m) in diameter. Charcoal was found in some holes, suggesting that burning may have taken place there. One suggestion is that the henge was a site for cremations. Within the stone circle there were imprints of the bases from the original stones, which have been compared to the bluestones located in Stonehenge and have been found to have matching dimensions.

The name "Bluestonehenge" is derived from the discovery of small stone chips in some of the stone settings. These bluestones are also found in Stonehenge and consist of a wide range of rock types originally from Pembrokeshire, west Wales, some 150 miles (240 km) away. Archaeologist Mike Parker Pearson suspects that any bluestones in the circle may have been removed around 2500 BC and incorporated into Stonehenge, which underwent major rebuilding work at about that time.

The stone circle settings were surrounded by a henge, comprising an 82-foot-wide (25 m) ditch and outer bank which appears to date from approximately 2400 BC. Unlike Stonehenge, this monument does not appear to have any significant solar or lunar orientations.

== Context ==
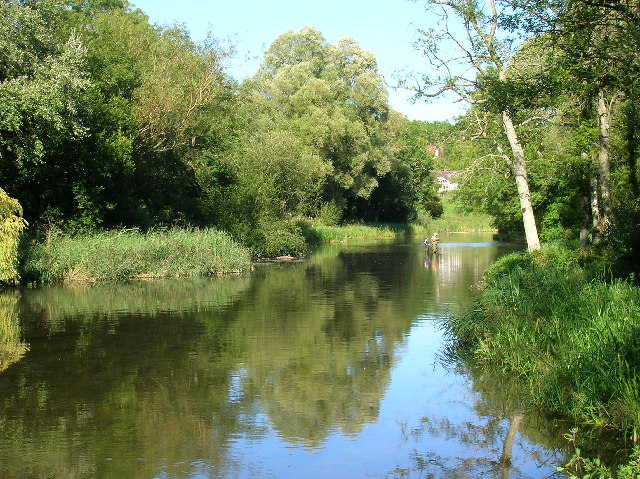
The River Avon near the site of Bluestonehenge

The henge is located beside the River Avon in West Amesbury. Immediately beside it is the Avenue, a linear ditch and bank route that leads to Stonehenge. Mike Parker Pearson has suggested that the site may have been used for ceremonial purposes – possibly as a stopping place along a routeway between Durrington Walls and Stonehenge.

It is thought that it was a ceremonial route from an area of life at Durrington Walls, through Bluestonehenge and along the "Stonehenge Avenue", to arrive at the site of an individual's final resting place in Stonehenge. This theory can be supported by the numerous cremation burials (over 200) that have been uncovered during excavation work around Stonehenge. Analysis of these remains also leads researchers to believe it was a ceremony for the wealthier in the region, or of royal lineage, or even for those who helped initiate construction of Stonehenge. This select group of individuals was believed to be male adults who were 25–40 years old and who seemed quite healthy.

Mike Parker Pearson's past experience working with a colleague from Madagascar also helped to shape his theory. He believes that the choice of stone material for Stonehenge is significant. Past civilizations often reserved stone for construction of their ancestors' tombs, while the perishable material, such as the wood used for the Durrington Walls timber circles, was reserved for the living. Parker Pearson believes that Durrington Walls may have been a "land of the living" while Stonehenge (which was Britain's largest known cemetery at the time) was a "domain of the dead".

== See also ==
- Excavations at Stonehenge
- Theories about Stonehenge
- Woodhenge
