= Excavations at Stonehenge =

Archaeological excavations at Stonehenge site

Coordinates: 51°10′44″N 1°49′36″W

Records of archaeological excavations at the Stonehenge site date back to the early 17th century.

== Early research ==
The first known excavations at Stonehenge were undertaken by Dr William Harvey and Gilbert North in the early 17th century. Both Inigo Jones and the Duke of Buckingham also dug there shortly afterwards. In 1666 the antiquarian John Aubrey could still see the central sunken hollow where the Duke of Buckingham's pit had been filled. A few minor investigations followed.

Further excavations at Stonehenge were carried out by William Cunnington and Richard Colt Hoare. In 1798, Cunnington investigated the pit beneath a recently fallen trilithon, and in 1810 both men dug beneath the fallen Slaughter Stone and concluded that it had once stood up. They may have also excavated one of the Aubrey Holes beneath it. In 1839, a Captain Beamish dug around the Altar Stone, and not long after that Charles Darwin was granted permission by the Antrobus family who owned Stonehenge to conduct a small excavation to test his theories about earthworm activity burying ancient structures.

== Modern studies ==
On New Year's Eve 1900, Stone 22 of the Sarsen Circle fell over, taking with it a lintel. Following public pressure and a letter to The Times by William Flinders Petrie, the then owner of Stonehenge, Edmund Antrobus, agreed to some remedial engineering work to be undertaken with archaeological supervision so that records could be made of the below ground archaeology. Antrobus appointed a mining engineer named William Gowland to manage the work. Despite having no archaeological training, Gowland produced some of the finest, most detailed excavation records ever made at the monument. Gowland established that antler picks were used to dig the stone holes and suggested the stones themselves were worked to shape on site.

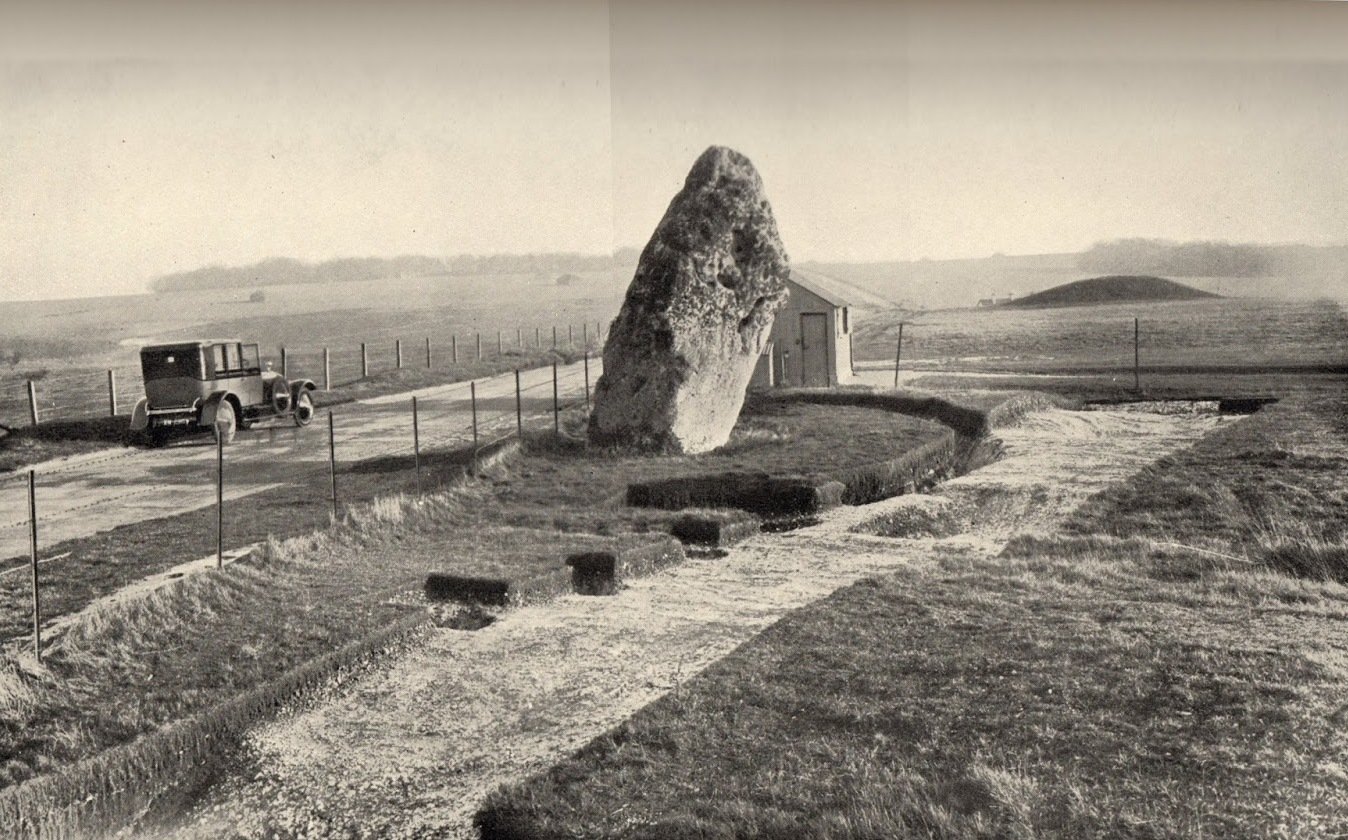
Excavations near the Heel Stone (The Antiquaries Journal, 1925)

The largest series of excavations at Stonehenge were undertaken by Colonel William Hawley and his assistant Robert Newall after the site came into state hands. Stonehenge and 30 acres (120,000 m^{2}) of land was purchased by Mr. Cecil Chubb for £6,600 on 21 September 1915 for his wife — she donated the land to the British government three years later. Their work began in 1919 following the transfer of land, funded by the Office of Works, and continued until 1926. Hawley and Newall excavated portions of most of the features at Stonehenge and were the first to establish that it was a multi-phase site.

In 1950 the Society of Antiquaries commissioned Richard J. C. Atkinson, Stuart Piggott and John FS Stone to carry out further excavations. They recovered many cremations and developed the phrasing that still dominates much of what is written about Stonehenge.

As part of service trenching in 1979 and 1980, Mike Pitts led two smaller investigations close by the Heelstone, finding the evidence for its neighbour. More recent excavations have been held to mitigate the effects of electrical cables, sewage pipes, and a footpath through the site.

Since 2003, Mike Parker Pearson has led investigations in the stones area as part of the Stonehenge Riverside Project in an attempt to better relate Stonehenge to its surrounding environs. National Geographic Channel screened a two-hour documentary exploring Parker Pearson's theories and the work of the Riverside Project in depth in May 2008. In April 2008 Professor Tim Darvill of the University of Bournemouth and Professor Geoff Wainwright of the Society of Antiquaries excavated a small area inside the stone circle It is hoped this will establish a more precise date for the earliest stone structure that occupied the Q and R Holes.

From 2005 excavation of the area around a spring pool known as Blick Mead about a mile from Stonehenge, have taken place under the direction of Professor David Jacques of the University of Buckingham. These have revealed the earliest settlement in the area dating to the period 7900 BC to 4050 BC.

Britain's Bournemouth University archaeologists, led by Geoffrey Wainwright, president of the London Society of Antiquaries, and Timothy Darvill, on 22 September 2008, found it may have been an ancient healing and pilgrimage site, since burials around Stonehenge showed trauma and deformity evidence: "It was the magical qualities of these stones which ... transformed the monument and made it a place of pilgrimage for the sick and injured of the Neolithic world." Radio-carbon dating places the construction of the circle of bluestones at between 2,400 B.C. and 2,200 B.C., but they discovered charcoals dating 7,000 B.C., showing human activity in the site. It could be a primeval equivalent of Lourdes, since the area was already visited 4,000 years before the oldest stone circle, and attracted visitors for centuries after its abandonment.

== See also ==
- Stonehenge
- Archaeoastronomy and Stonehenge
- Battle of the Beanfield
- Theories about Stonehenge
- Stonehenge replicas and derivatives
- Stone circle
- Cultural depictions of Stonehenge
- Stonehenge road tunnel
- Stonehenge Riverside Project
