= Theories about Stonehenge =

Theories on the origin and purpose of Stonehenge

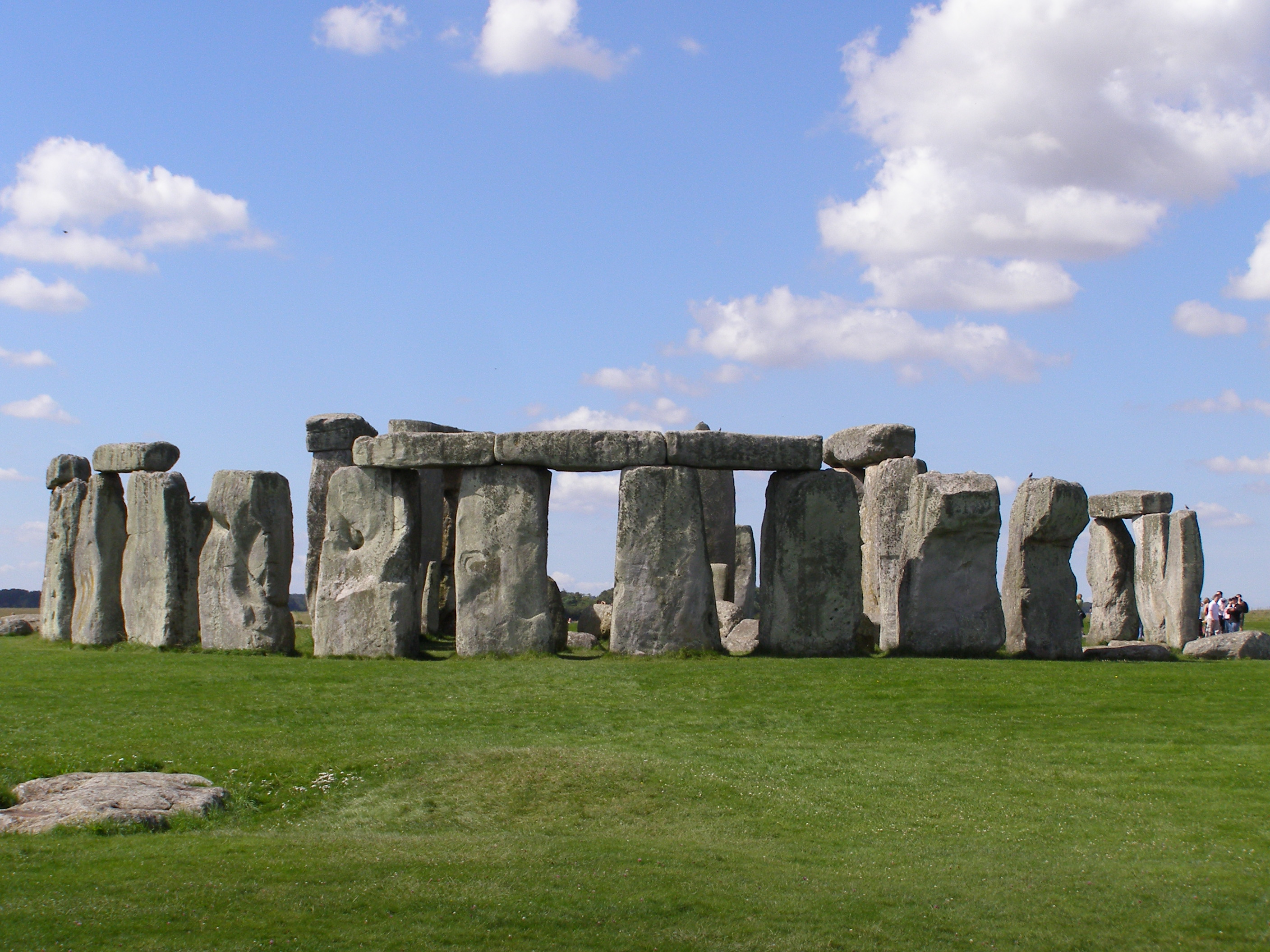
Stonehenge in 2007

Stonehenge has been the subject of many theories about its origin, ranging from the academic worlds of archaeology to explanations from mythology and the paranormal.

== Early theories ==
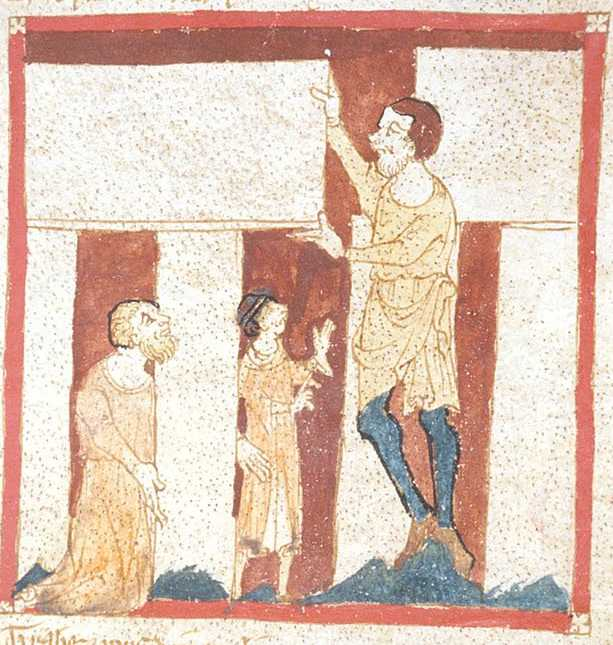
A giant helps Merlin build Stonehenge. From a 14th-century manuscript of the Brut by Wace in the British Library (Egerton 3028). This is the oldest known depiction of Stonehenge.

Many early historians were influenced by supernatural folktales in their explanations. Some legends held that Merlin had a giant build the structure for him or that he had magically transported it from Mount Killaraus in Ireland, while others held the Devil responsible.

Henry of Huntingdon was the first to write of the monument around AD 1130 soon followed by Geoffrey of Monmouth who was the first to record fanciful associations with Merlin which led the monument to be incorporated into the wider cycle of European medieval romance. According to Geoffrey's Historia Regum Britanniae, when asked what might serve as an appropriate burial place for Britain's dead princes, Merlin advised King Aurelius Ambrosius to raise an army and collect some magical stones from Mount Killarus in Ireland. Whilst at Mount Killarus, Merlin laughed at the soldiers' failed attempts to remove the stones using ladders, ropes, and other machinery. Shortly thereafter, Merlin oversaw the removal of stones using his own machinery and commanded they be loaded onto the soldiers' ships and sailed back to England where they were reconstructed into Stonehenge. Contrary to popular belief Geoffrey did not claim Merlin had commanded a giant to build Stonehenge for him, it appears this detail was embellished by Robert Wace who later translated Geoffrey's original text into French.

In 1655, the architect John Webb, writing in the name of his former superior Inigo Jones, argued that Stonehenge was a Roman temple, dedicated to Caelus, (a Latin name for the Greek sky-god Uranus), and built following the Tuscan order. Later commentators maintained that the Danes erected it. Indeed, up until the late nineteenth century, the site was commonly attributed to the Saxons or other relatively recent societies.

== Druids and scientific evidence ==
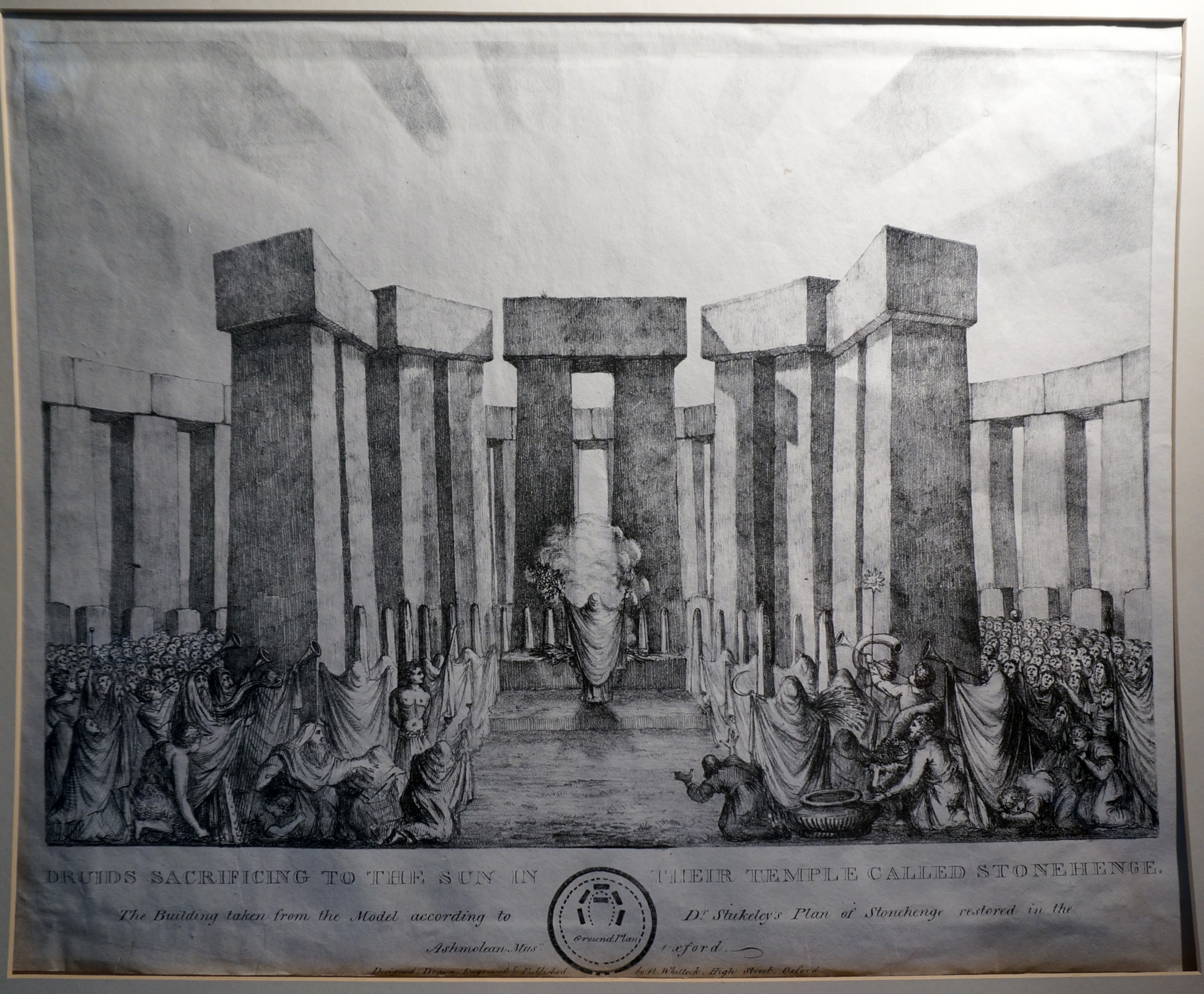
"Druids sacrificing to the Sun in their temple called Stonehenge", a 1722 engraving of the site as imagined by William Stukeley

The first academic effort to survey and understand the monument was made around 1640 by John Aubrey. He declared Stonehenge the work of Druids. This view was greatly popularised by William Stukeley. Aubrey also contributed the first measured drawings of the site, which permitted greater analysis of its form and significance. From this work, he demonstrated an astronomical or calendrical role in the placement of the stones. The architect John Wood, the Elder was to undertake the first truly accurate survey of Stonehenge in 1740. However, Wood's interpretation of the monument as a place of pagan ritual was vehemently attacked by Stukeley, who saw the druids not as pagans, but as biblical patriarchs.

By the turn of the nineteenth century, John Lubbock, 1st Baron Avebury was able to attribute the site to the Bronze Age based on the bronze objects found in the nearby barrows.

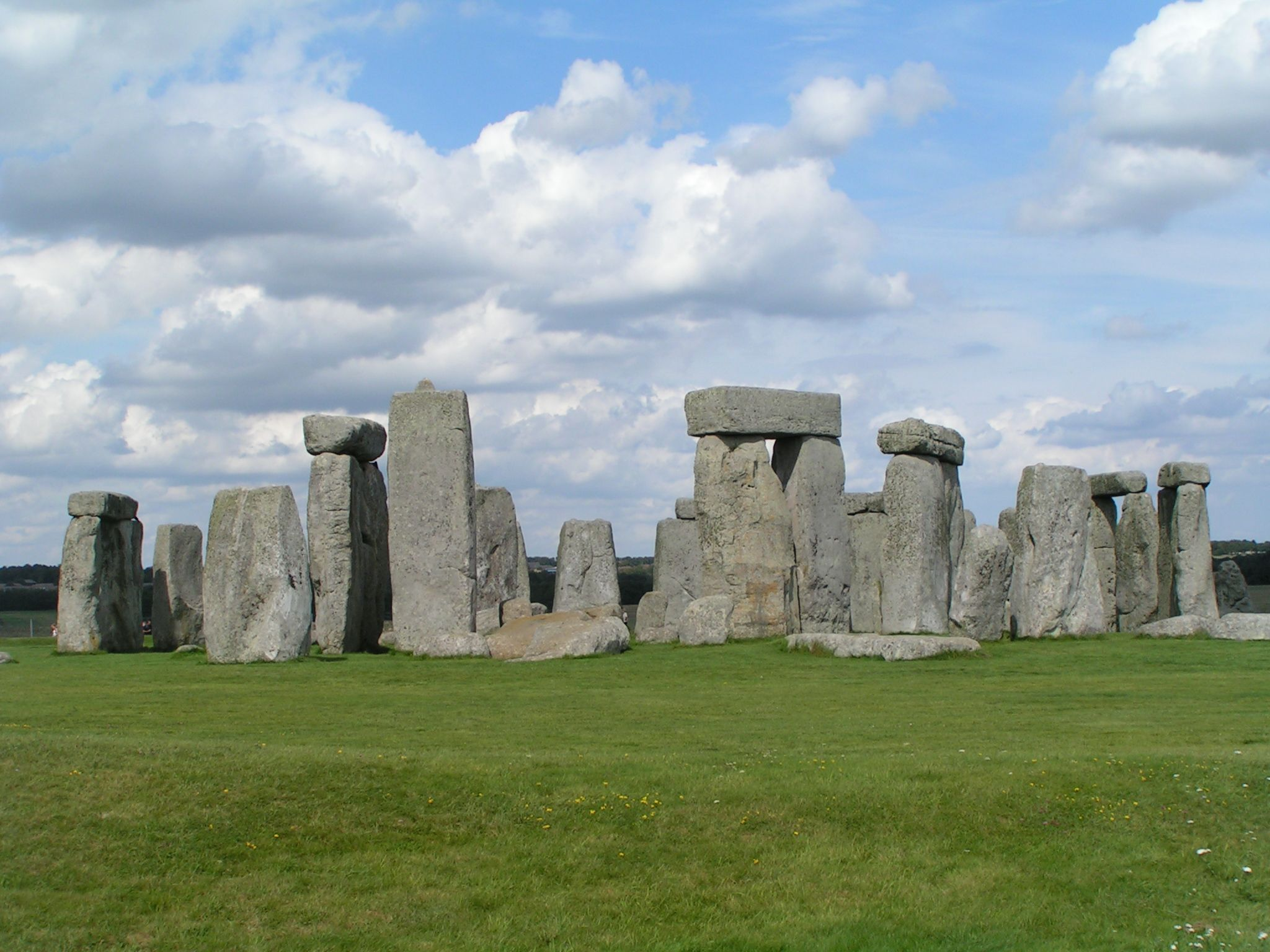
Stonehenge

=== Radiocarbon dating ===
Radiocarbon dating of the site indicates that the building of the monument at the site began around the year 3100 BC and ended around the year 1600 BC. This allows the elimination of some of the theories presented. The theory that the Druids were responsible may be the most popular; however, the Celtic Britons who spawned the Druid priesthood emerged only after 300 BC. Additionally, the Druids are unlikely to have used the site for sacrifices, because they performed the majority of their rituals in the woods or mountains, areas better suited for "earth rituals" than an open field. The fact that the Romans first came to the British Isles when Julius Caesar led an expedition in 55 BC negates the theories of Inigo Jones and others that Stonehenge was built as a Roman temple.

== Early references to Stonehenge ==
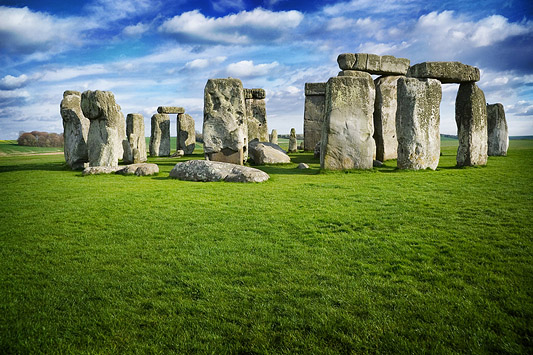
NW side of Stonehenge in April 2009

The classical Greek writer Diodorus Siculus (1st century BC) may refer to Stonehenge in a passage from his Bibliotheca historica. Citing the 4th-century BC historian Hecataeus of Abdera and "certain others", Diodorus says that in "a land beyond the Celts" (i.e. Gaul) there is "an island no smaller than Sicily" in the northern sea called Hyperborea, so named because it is beyond the source of the north wind or Boreas. The inhabitants of this place chiefly worship Apollo, and there is "both a magnificent sacred precinct of Apollo and a notable temple which is adorned with many votive offerings and is spherical in shape." Some writers have suggested that Diodorus' "Hyperborea" may indicate Great Britain, and that the spherical temple may be an early reference of Stonehenge.

Christopher Chippindale commented that "This might be Stonehenge, but the description is short and vague, and there are discrepancies — the climate of the Hyperboreans is so mild they grow two crops a year." Aubrey Burl noted that other parts of Diodorus' description make it a poor fit for Stonehenge and its neighbourhood. Diodorus also says that in that area Apollo (meaning the Sun or the Moon) "skimmed the earth at a very low height". However, both the Moon and the Sun are always seen far above the horizon at the latitude of Stonehenge; only 500 miles farther north can they be observed to remain near the horizon.

== The bluestones ==
J. F. S. Stone felt that a bluestone monument had earlier stood near the nearby Stonehenge Cursus and the stone had been moved to their current site from there. If Mercer's theory is correct then the bluestones may have been transplanted to cement an alliance or display superiority over a conquered enemy, although this can only be speculation. An oval-shaped setting of bluestones similar to those at Stonehenge 3iv occurs at Bedd Arthur in the Preseli Hills, but that does not imply a direct cultural link. Some archaeologists have suggested that the igneous bluestones and sedimentary sarsens had some symbolism, of a union between two cultures from different landscapes and therefore from different backgrounds.

Recent analysis of contemporary burials found nearby known as the Boscombe Bowmen, has indicated that at least some of the individuals associated with Stonehenge 3 came either from Wales or from some other European area of ancient rocks. Petrological analysis of the stones themselves has verified that some of them have come from the Preseli Hills but that others have come from the north Pembrokeshire coast and possibly the Brecon Beacons.

The main source of the bluestones is now identified with the dolerite outcrops around Carn Goedog although work led by Olwen Williams-Thorpe of the Open University has shown that other bluestones came from outcrops up to 10 km away. Dolerite is composed of an intrusive volcanic rock of plagioclase feldspar that is harder than granite.

Aubrey Burl and a number of geologists and geomorphologists contend that the bluestones were not transported by human agency at all and were instead brought by glaciers at least part of the way from Wales during the Pleistocene. There is good geological and glaciological evidence that glacier ice did move across Preseli and did reach the Somerset coast. It is uncertain that it reached Salisbury Plain, although a spotted dolerite boulder was found in a long barrow at Heytesbury in Wiltshire, which was built long before the stone settings at Stonehenge were installed. One current view is that glacier ice transported the stones as far as Somerset, and that they were transported from there by the builders of Stonehenge. However, in 2015, researchers reported they had confirmed the Preseli Spotted Dolerite stones at Stonehenge came from two Neolithic quarries at Carn Goedog and Craig Rhos-y-felin in the Preseli Hills. Using radiocarbon dating, researchers dated the quarry activities to around 3400 BC for Craig Rhos-y-felin and 3200 BC for Carn Goedog. Project director Professor Mike Parker Pearson of the UCL Institute of Archaeology noted the finding was "intriguing because the bluestones didn't get put up at Stonehenge until around 2900 BC... It could have taken those Neolithic stone-draggers nearly 500 years to get them to Stonehenge, but that's pretty improbable in my view. It's more likely that the stones were first used in a local monument, somewhere near the quarries, that was then dismantled and dragged off to Wiltshire." In 2018 two of the quarries – Carn Goedog and Craig Rhos-y-felin – underwent more excavation to reveal evidence of megalith quarrying around 3000 BC. If true, this shortens the period between excavation and transportation to the Stonehenge site.

During 2017 and 2018, excavations by Pearson's team at Waun Mawn, a small and unimpressive-seeming fragmentary stone circle in the Preseli Hills, revealed that the site had originally housed a 110 metre diameter stone circle of the same size as Stonehenge's original bluestone circle, and also like it, oriented towards the summer solstice. The circle at Waun Mawn also contained a hole from one stone which had a distinctive pentagonal shape, very closely matching the one pentagonal stone at Stonehenge (stonehole 91 at Waun Mawn/stone 62 at Stonehenge). Soil dating of the sediments within the revealed stone holes, via optically stimulated luminescence (OSL), suggested the absent stones at Waun Mawn had been erected around 3400-3200 BC, and removed around 300-400 years later, a date consistent with theories that the same stones were moved and used at the more famous site, before later being reorganised into their present locations and supplemented with local sarsens as was already understood. Human activity at Waun Mawn ceased around the same time, and overall the pattern, along with isotope studies suggesting that at least some of the population at Stonehenge originated and lived in the Western Wales area, suggested migration to the researchers. However, as it seems unlikely that Waun Mawn ever contained as many of the same type of stones, as Stonehenge, it is considered possible that stones from other sources may have been added, perhaps from other dismantled circles in the region. The discoveries were published in February 2021, and popularised in a documentary the same month.

=== Healing ===
Britain's Geoffrey Wainwright, president of the London Society of Antiquaries, and Timothy Darvill, on 22 September 2008, speculated that it may have been an ancient healing and pilgrimage site, since burials around Stonehenge showed trauma and deformity evidence: "It was the magical qualities of these stones which ... transformed the monument and made it a place of pilgrimage for the sick and injured of the Neolithic world." Radio-carbon dating places the construction of the circle of bluestones at between 2400-2200 BC, but they discovered charcoals dating to 7000 BC, showing human activity in the site. It could be the primeval equivalent of Lourdes, since the area was already visited 4,000 years before the oldest stone circle, and attracted visitors for centuries after its abandonment. Some tentative support for this view comes from the first-century BC Greek historian, Diodorus Siculus, who cites a lost account set down three centuries earlier, which described "a magnificent precinct sacred to Apollo and a notable spherical temple" on a large island in the far north, opposite what is now France. Amongst other attributes Apollo was recognised as the god of medicine and healing. This theory is hotly disputed, on the grounds that it is not adequately underpinned by evidence on the ground, either in the Preseli Hills area or at Stonehenge.

=== Acoustic properties ===
A study by researchers at the Royal College of Art, London, has proposed that the bluestones may have been attractive for their acoustic properties.

=== Mnemonic centre ===
Lynne Kelly in her work Knowledge and Power in Prehistoric Societies: Orality, Memory, and the Transmission of Culture (2015), investigates the link between power and the control of knowledge in oral cultures, as well as the different mnemonic techniques and devices used by those cultures. According to Kelly's theory, Stonehenge served the purpose of a mnemonic centre for recording and retrieving knowledge by Neolithic Britons, who lacked written language. The knowledge could have included pragmatic information on animal classification and behaviour, geography and navigation, land management and crop cycles, as well as cultural knowledge on history, politics, genealogy and religion.

== Stonehenge as part of a ritual landscape ==
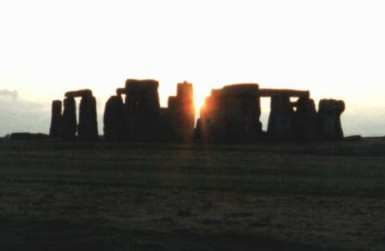
Sunset at Stonehenge

Many archaeologists believe Stonehenge was an attempt to render in permanent stone the more common timber structures that dotted Salisbury Plain at the time, such as those that stood at Durrington Walls. Modern anthropological evidence has been used by Mike Parker Pearson and the Malagasy archaeologist Ramilisonina to suggest that timber was associated with the living and stone with the ancestral dead amongst prehistoric peoples. They have argued that Stonehenge was the terminus of a long, ritualised funerary procession for treating the dead, which began in the east, during sunrise at Woodhenge and Durrington Walls, moved down the Avon and then along the Avenue reaching Stonehenge in the west at sunset. The journey from wood to stone via water, they consider, is a symbolic journey from life to death. There is no satisfactory evidence to suggest that Stonehenge's astronomical alignments were anything more than symbolic, and current interpretations favour a ritual role for the monument that takes into account its numerous burials and its presence within a wider landscape of sacred sites. Many also believe that the site may have had astrological/spiritual significance attached to it.

Support for this view also comes from the historian of religions Mircea Eliade, who compares the site to other megalithic constructions worldwide devoted to the cult of the dead (ancestors).

Like other similar English monuments (for example, Eliade identifies Woodhenge, Avebury, Arminghall, and Arbor Low), the Stonehenge cromlech was situated in the middle of a field of funeral barrows. This famous ceremonial centre constituted, at least in its primitive form, a sanctuary built to insure [sic?] relations with the ancestors. In terms of structure, Stonehenge can be compared with certain megalithic complexes developed, in other cultures, from a sacred area: temples or cities. We have the same valourisation of the sacred space as "centre of the world", the privileged place that affords communication with heaven and the underworld, that is, with the gods, the chtonian [sic] goddesses, and the spirits of the dead.

In addition to the English sites, Eliade identifies, among others, the Megalithic Temples of Malta, which represent a "spectacular expression" of a cult of the dead and worship of a Great Goddess.

Radar mapping also reveals that three chalk ridges in the Stonehenge area are aligned by geological accident on the midsummer sunrise/midwinter axis. This natural solstitial alignment would have symbolized cosmic unity to the ancients, a place where Heaven and Earth were unified by some supernatural force. This seems to have set the blueprint for solstitial alignments in Stonehenge and the timber circles at Durrington Walls and Woodhenge, as well.

Mike Parker Pearson also believes that Stonehenge was a monument of unification, bringing together different groups with different ancestries. He surmises that the five trilithons in the centre of Stonehenge could have symbolized five tribal lineages charting their descent from five original ancestors. The Preseli Hills might also have had some ancestral significance for the Stonehenge builders (perhaps this was their place of origin). This may have been the motive behind dragging the bluestones all the way from the Preseli Hills to Wiltshire. The trilithons may also have represented a D-shaped meeting house, similar structures having been found at other Neolithic sites in Britain. This may have represented a meeting place for the ancestors of the Stonehenge builders. Others have suggested that the trilithons represented doorways to another world.

== Construction techniques and design ==
Directions of sunrise and sunset at Stonehenge on the 21st of each month, where 𝜙 is its latitude and 𝜀 is Earth's axial tilt

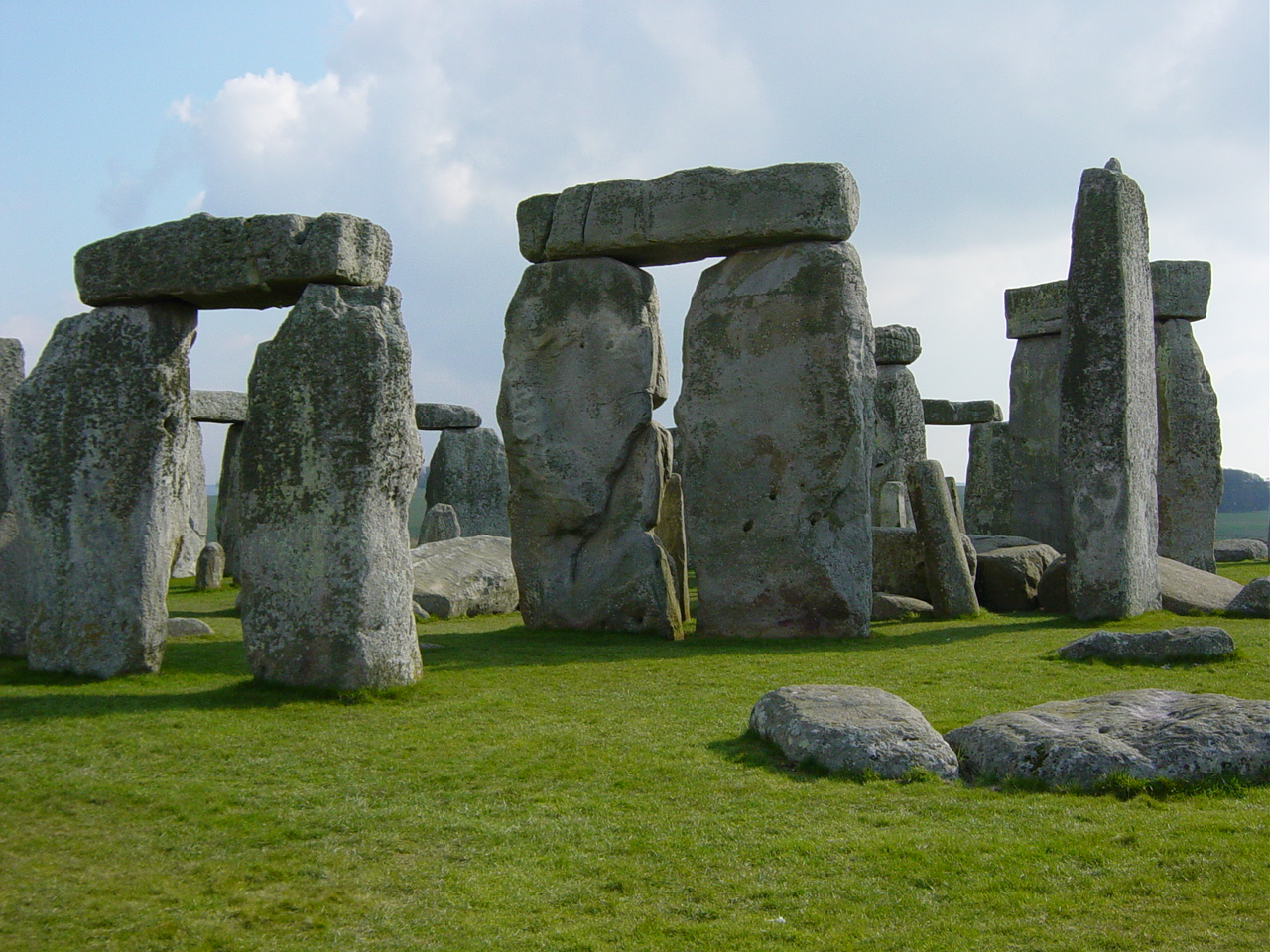
Closeup of Stonehenge

A recently published analysis draws attention to the fact that the stones display mirrored symmetry and that the only undisputed alignment to be found is that of the solstices, which can be regarded as the axis of that symmetry. This interpretation sees the monument as having been designed off-site, largely prefabricated and set out to conform to survey markers set out to an exact geometric plan.

The idea of 'precision' (below) demands that exact points of reference were used, both between the structural elements and in relation to the axis (i.e. that of the solstices). Johnson's theory asserts that prehistoric survey markers could not have been placed within the footprint of the stones, but must have been (as in any construction) external to the stones. That almost all the stones have one 'better' i.e. flatter face, and that face is almost invariably inwards, suggests that the construction was set out so that the prehistoric builders could use the center point of the inner faces as reference. This is very significant in respect of the Great Trilithon; the surviving upright has its flatter face outwards (see image on right), towards the midwinter sunset, and was raised from the inside. The remainder of the trilithon array (and almost all of the stones of the Sarsen Circle) had construction ramps which sloped inwards, and were therefore set up from the outside. Placing the centre face of the stones (regardless of their thickness) against markers would mean that the 'gaps' between the stones were simply consequential. The study of the geometric layout of the monument shows that such methods were used and that there is a clear argument for regarding other outlying elements as part of a geometric scheme (e.g. the 'Station Stones' and the stoneholes 92 and 94 which mark two opposing facets of an octagon). A geometric design is scalable from concept to construction, removing much of the need for measurements to be made at all.

Much speculation has surrounded the engineering feats required to build Stonehenge. Assuming the bluestones were brought from Wales by hand, and not transported by glaciers as Aubrey Burl has claimed, various methods of moving them relying only on timber and rope have been suggested. In a 2001 exercise in experimental archaeology, an attempt was made to transport a large stone along a land and sea route from Wales to Stonehenge. Volunteers pulled it for some miles (with great difficulty) on a wooden sledge over land, using modern roads and low-friction netting to assist sliding, but it became clear that it would have been incredibly difficult for even the most organized of tribal groups to have pulled large numbers of stones across the densely wooded, rough and boggy terrain of West Wales.

In 2010, Nova's "Secrets of Stonehenge" broadcast an effective technique for moving the stones over short distances using ball bearings in a wooden track as originally envisioned by Andrew Young, a graduate student of Bruce Bradley—director of experimental archaeology at the University of Exeter.

Experts hit on the new idea after examining mysterious stone balls found near Stonehenge-like monuments in Aberdeenshire, Scotland. About the size of a cricket ball, they are precisely fashioned to be within a millimetre of the same size. This suggests they were meant to be used together in some way rather than individually.

In 1997 Julian Richards teamed up with Mark Witby and Roger Hopkins to conduct several experiments to replicate the construction at Stonehenge for Nova's "Secrets of Lost Empires" mini series. They arranged for a gang of 130 people to attempt to tow a 40-ton concrete replica on a sledge which was placed on wooden tracks. They used grease to make it easier to tow up a slight incline and still they were unable to budge it. They gathered additional men and had some of them use levers to try to pry the megalith while others towed it at the same time. When they all worked together at the same time they were able to move it forward. They were uncertain whether this would be the way they would have transported the largest stones 25 miles. To do this would require an enormous amount of track and a lot of coordination for a large number of people. In some cases this would involve towing the stones over rougher terrain. They also conducted an experiment to erect 2 forty ton replicas and put a 9-ton lintel on top. After a lot of experimenting they were able to erect 2 megaliths using a large number of people towing and using levers. They also managed to tow the lintel up a steel ramp. They were unable to determine this was the final answer but they demonstrated that this was a possible method. At times they were forced to use modern technology for safety reasons.

Josh Bernstein and Julian Richards organized an experiment to pull a 2-ton stone on wooden tracks with a group of about 16 men. They placed the stone on a wooden sledge then placed the sledge on a wooden track. They pulled this with two gangs of about eight men. To move the stones as many miles across Southern England, the creators of Stonehenge would have had to build a lot of track, or move and rebuild track in pieces, as the stones were taken to their final destination.

A recent article has argued that the massive stones could be moved by submerging them in water and towing them below an ancient vessel or group of vessels. This technique would have two significant advantages. It would reduce the load borne by the vessel while part of the stone's weight is displaced by the water. Secondly, the arrangement of the load below the vessel would be much more stable and reduce the risk of catastrophic failure. Naturally, this would apply only for transportation over water. The technique was tried during the Millennium Stone Project 2000, with a single bluestone slung beneath two large curraghs. The sling frayed away, and the stone plunged to the bed of Milford Haven.

It has been suggested that timber A-frames were erected to raise the stones, and that teams of people then hauled them upright using ropes. The topmost stones may have been raised up incrementally on timber platforms and slid into place or pushed up ramps. The carpentry-type joints used on the stones imply a people well skilled in woodworking and they could easily have had the knowledge to erect the monument using such methods. In 2003 retired construction worker Wally Wallington demonstrated ingenious techniques based on fundamental principles of levers, fulcrums and counterweights to show that a single man can rotate, walk, lift and tip a ten-ton cast-concrete monolith into an upright position. He is progressing with his plan to construct a simulated Stonehenge with eight uprights and two lintels.

Alexander Thom was of the opinion that the site was laid out with the necessary precision using his megalithic yard.

The engraved weapons on the sarsens are unique in megalithic art in the British Isles, where more abstract designs were invariably favoured. Similarly, the horseshoe arrangements of stones are unusual in a culture that otherwise arranged stones in circles. The axe motif is, however, common to the peoples of Brittany at the time, and it has been suggested at least two stages of Stonehenge were built under continental influence. This would go some way towards explaining the monument's atypical design, but overall, Stonehenge is still inexplicably unusual in the context of any prehistoric European culture.

Estimates of the manpower needed to build Stonehenge put the total effort involved at millions of hours of work. Stonehenge 1 probably needed around 11,000 man-hours (or 460 man-days) of work, Stonehenge 2 around 360,000 (15,000 man-days or 41 years). The various parts of Stonehenge 3 may have involved up to 1.75 million hours (73,000 days or 200 years) of work. The working of the stones is estimated to have required around 20 million hours (830,000 days or 2,300 years) of work using the primitive tools available at the time. Certainly, the will to produce such a site must have been strong, and an advanced social organization would have been necessary to build and maintain it. However, Wally Wallington's work suggests that Stonehenge's construction may have required fewer man-hours than previously estimated.

== Ley lines ==
British author John Michell wrote that Alfred Watkins's ley lines appeared to be in alignment with various traditional sacred sites around the country, such as the 'Perpetual Choirs' apparently mentioned in the Welsh Triads. Michell wrote that "There is a curious symmetry about the positioning of the three Perpetual Choirs in Britain. Stonehenge and Llantwit Major are equidistant from Glastonbury, some 38.9 miles away, and two straight lines drawn on the map from Glastonbury to the other two choirs form an angle of 144 degrees...The axis of Glastonbury Abbey points toward Stonehenge, and there is some evidence that it was built on a stretch on ancient trackway which once ran between the two Choirs". But as Glastonbury Abbey was built some four thousand years after Stonehenge, the relevance or likelihood of a link between them is debatable. Michell created diagrams that illustrated correlations between the design of Stonehenge and astronomical proportions and relationships. However, it is claimed that the Welsh Triads refer not to Stonehenge but to the village of Amesbury, which is two miles from Stonehenge.

== See also ==
- List of megalithic sites
- Egyptian pyramid construction techniques

== Bibliography ==
- Chippindale, Christopher, Stonehenge Complete (Thames and Hudson, London, 2004) ISBN 0-500-28467-9.
- Johnson, Anthony, Solving Stonehenge: The New Key to an Ancient Enigma (Thames & Hudson, London 2008) ISBN 978-0-500-05155-9
- Kelly, Lynne Knowledge and Power in Prehistoric Societies: Orality, Memory, and the Transmission of Culture (2015) Cambridge University Press ISBN 978-1107059375 OCLC 910935575
- Thomas N.L., "Stonehengen Sacred Symbolism" 2011 @(www.bookpod.com.au) ISBN 9780957828254 pbk, ISBN 9780987213532 ebook.
