= Christopher J. Fowler =

British archaeologist

- Awards: Rivers Memorial Medal (2026)

Academic background
- Education: University of Southampton
- Thesis: On discourse and materiality: personhood in the Neolithic of the Isle of Man (1999)
- Doctoral advisor: Julian Thomas

Academic work
- Discipline: Prehistoric archaeology; Archaeological theory
- Institutions: University of Manchester; Newcastle University

Chris Fowler is a British archaeologist and Professor of Archaeology at Newcastle University. His research focuses on the archaeology of Neolithic and Early Bronze Age Britain and Ireland, particularly mortuary practices, kinship, identity, personhood and archaeological theory. He is known for his work on relational approaches to personhood in archaeology and for research integrating archaeological and genetic evidence to investigate prehistoric kinship.

Since 2020, Fowler has served as Programme Director for Research Degrees in Archaeology at Newcastle University.

== Education ==
Fowler studied archaeology at the University of Southampton, completing a BA (Hons) and PhD. His doctoral thesis, completed in 1999 under the supervision of Julian Thomas, was entitled On Discourse and Materiality: Personhood in the Neolithic of the Isle of Man.

== Career ==
Following completion of his doctorate, Fowler held a Leverhulme Special Research Fellowship at the University of Manchester between 2000 and 2002. He joined Newcastle University as lecturer in Later Prehistory in 2004 and was subsequently promoted to Professor of Archaeology.

== Research ==
Fowler's research examines social relationships and identity in prehistoric societies, with particular emphasis on the Neolithic and Early Bronze Age of Britain and Ireland. His work has explored themes including mortuary practices, personhood, kinship, embodiment, typology and archaeological interpretation.

Fowler is associated with the development of relational approaches to personhood in archaeology. His book The Archaeology of Personhood (2004) examined how identities and social relationships may be understood through archaeological evidence.

In The Emergent Past (2013), Fowler developed a relational approach to the study of Early Bronze Age mortuary practices in Britain. The research drew on Bronze Age collections held by the Great North Museum: Hancock, which the museum describes as an important element in the reassessment of Early Bronze Age burial practices in north-east England that led to the publication of the book.

From 2016 to 2020, Fowler co-directed the Round Mounds of the Isle of Man project with Rachel Crellin in partnership with Manx National Heritage. The project investigated Early Bronze Age burial mounds across the Isle of Man and included excavations at Berk Farm, Kirk Michael, where archaeologists recovered a jet bead necklace that is displayed in the Prehistory Gallery of the Manx Museum. This is the first necklace of its kind found on the Isle of Man.

Fowler was the archaeology lead on research at Hazleton North, a Neolithic chambered tomb in Gloucestershire. In a study published in Nature in 2022, Fowler and colleagues combined archaeological evidence and ancient DNA analysis from 35 individuals buried at the site. The study reconstructed a five-generation pedigree comprising 27 biologically related individuals and provided new evidence for kinship organisation and burial practices in Early Neolithic Britain.

The findings received international media attention and were widely reported as the reconstruction of the oldest family tree yet identified through ancient DNA analysis.

Fowler serves on the editorial board of the Journal of the Royal Anthropological Institute.

== Honours and awards ==
In 2026, Fowler was awarded the Rivers Memorial Medal of the Royal Anthropological Institute. The award recognised his contributions to the archaeology of Neolithic and Early Bronze Age Britain and his research on prehistoric kinship and the implications of ancient DNA for archaeological interpretation.

== Selected works ==
- Fowler, C. (2004). The Archaeology of Personhood: An Anthropological Approach. London: Routledge.
- Fowler, C. (2013). The Emergent Past: A Relational Realist Archaeology of Early Bronze Age Mortuary Practices. Oxford: Oxford University Press.
- Fowler, C. (2016). "Relational Personhood Revisited". Cambridge Archaeological Journal 26 (3): 397–412.
- Crellin, R.; Fowler, C.; Gamble, M. (2020). "Thinking Outside the Cist: Interpreting a Unique Artefact Assemblage from an Early Bronze Age Burial on the Isle of Man". Antiquity 94 (378): 1444–1463.
- Fowler, C.; Olalde, I.; Cummings, V.; Armit, I.; Büster, L.; Cuthbert, S.; et al. (2022). "A High-Resolution Picture of Kinship Practices in an Early Neolithic Tomb". Nature 601 (7894): 584–587.
- Cummings, V.; Fowler, C. (2023). "Materialising Descent: Lineage Formation and Transformation in Early Neolithic Southern Britain". Proceedings of the Prehistoric Society 89: 1–21.
