= Stonehenge Avenue =

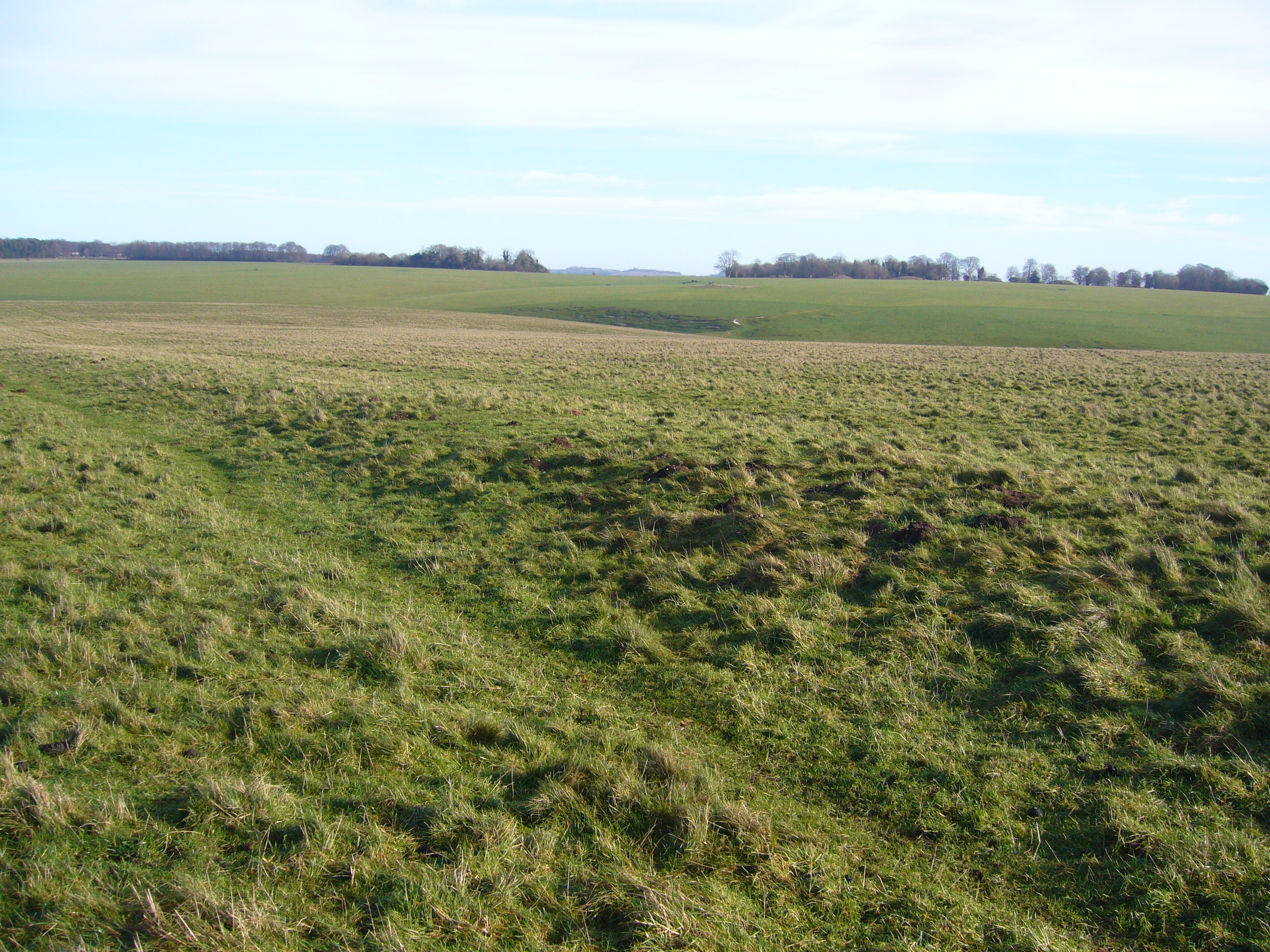
- The Avenue at Stonehenge looking ENE towards Old and New King Barrows

- 51.179°N 1.8253°W
- Type: avenue
- Periods: Neolithic
- Region: Wiltshire

Site notes
- Excavation dates: from 1740, 2013
- Archaeologists: William Stukeley, Heather Sebire
- Condition: Excellent
- Public access: Yes
- Website: National Trust

UNESCO World Heritage Site
- Type: Cultural
- Criteria: i, ii, iii
- Designated: 1986 (10th session)
- Reference no.: 373
- Region: Europe and North America

Scheduled monument
- Designated: 1882
- Reference no.: 1010140

Stonehenge Avenue is an ancient avenue on Salisbury Plain, Wiltshire, England. It is part of the Stonehenge, Avebury and Associated Sites UNESCO World Heritage Site. Discovered in the 18th century, it measures nearly 3 kilometres, and connects Stonehenge with the River Avon. It was built during the Stonehenge 3 period of 2600 to 1700 BCE.

Along some of its length, the avenue is aligned with the sunrise of the summer solstice, suggesting a time of most frequent use. In 2013 a section of A344 road was closed, which had cut through the avenue close to Stonehenge. After the road surface was removed, it was shown that although the avenue's banks had been sliced off, the filled-in ditches were still in evidence, confirming that the avenue continued through to the stone circle.

At the end of the avenue, a ring of pits, referred to as Bluestonehenge, was discovered in 2009. No monoliths were found, and stone chips which were assumed to be of bluestone were later found to bear no relation to the bluestones at Stonehenge.

Natural ice age grooves called periglacial stripes are present in the ground underneath the avenue. Mike Parker Pearson of the Stonehenge Riverside Project believes that the avenue was inspired by, and built over the top of, this existing natural formation of parallel rills which had a significant astronomical alignment. The presence of ridges and gullies that happened to line up with the solstice directions may have been venerated, leading the Neolithic people to later build Stonehenge at this particular site.

The avenue, along with Stonehenge itself, is a scheduled monument, first designated in the 1882 act which was the earliest legislation to protect British archaeological sites.
