= Stonehenge Riverside Project =

Former British archaeological research study

The Stonehenge Riverside Project was a major Arts and Humanities Research Council-funded archaeological research study of the development of the Stonehenge landscape in Neolithic and Bronze Age Britain. In particular, the project examined the relationship between the stones and surrounding monuments and features, including the River Avon, Durrington Walls, the Cursus, the Avenue, Woodhenge, burial mounds, and nearby standing stones. The project involved a substantial amount of fieldwork and ran from 2003 to 2009. It found that Stonehenge was built 500 years earlier than previously thought. The monument is believed to have been built to unify the peoples of Britain. It also found a previously unknown stone circle, Bluestonehenge.

== Background ==
The project was directed by Mike Parker Pearson (Sheffield University), Julian Thomas (Manchester University), Colin Richards (Manchester University), Kate Welham (Bournemouth University), Joshua Pollard (University of Southampton), and Chris Tilley (University College London). The main aims of the project were to test the hypotheses of earlier studies that Stonehenge was a monument dedicated to the dead, whilst Woodhenge and Durrington Walls, two miles away, were monuments to the living and more recently deceased.

== Previous excavations ==
The area immediately inside Stonehenge Bowl has been excavated several times throughout history, but to the east around Durrington Walls, there have only been two major studies conducted within recent times. The first was between 1926 and 1929 when Maud Cunnington excavated around Woodhenge, discovering several Neolithic and Bronze Age features to the south. Later, when the nearby A345 was improved and routed through Durrington Walls in 1967, two timber circles were discovered within the henge. Also discovered were quantities of animal bones and associated Neolithic pottery and tools.

== Fieldwork ==
=== 2003 surveys ===
2003 fieldwork involved sampling and geophysical surveys of the land around Durrington Walls in preparation for future study. This work helped identify two previously unrecognised entranceways to the henge, to the north and south.

=== 2004 excavations ===
2004 marked the start of annual excavations in the Stonehenge landscape. Trenches were dug on the bank of the River Avon next to Durrington Walls, and at the eastern entrance to the henge. On this occasion various finds suggesting Neolithic occupation were found around the area.

=== 2005 excavations ===
More fieldwork was carried out in the summer of 2005. Excavations were made around the land east of Durrington Walls near the river, and north west outside the west gate. A large amount of digging was done on the eastern banks of the henge, and inside the walls to expose the southernmost timber circle discovered in 1967. A great deal of work was also carried out 2 miles east, around a fallen sarsen stone known locally as the Bulford Stone. Channel 4's archaeological television programme Time Team attended and built a temporary reconstruction of the timber circle in the nearby village of Upavon.

=== 2006 ===
Over 20 researchers and 170 students and volunteers were involved in excavations around Durrington Walls and investigations into the Stonehenge landscape. Among other things, new dating suggested that the sarsen phase of Stonehenge was contemporary with Durrington Walls at around 2640–2480 BC.

=== 2007 excavations ===
In late summer of 2007, four weeks of fieldwork was carried out by several hundred students and volunteers. Excavations were carried out at the western end of the Cursus; around the southern, western and eastern gates of Durrington Walls; at the site of Cunnington's digs immediately south of Woodhenge; and around another nearby fallen sarsen stone, known locally as the Cuckoo Stone. Geophysical surveys were also carried out across much of the surrounding area and around Stonehenge Bowl. Residencies for six artists and two graduate art student placements were arranged by Artists in Archaeology to record the processes of uncovering and interpreting this location.

=== 2008 excavations ===
In the late summer of 2008, a further four weeks of excavations were carried out. The year's excavation focused largely upon the Avenue, largely re-excavating work by Richard Atkinson. More work was carried out upon the eastern end of the Stonehenge Cursus, Long Barrow 42 at the eastern terminal of the Cursus, the field to the west of Stonehenge, and a re-excavation of one of the Aubrey Holes within the Stonehenge bowl. The excavation was covered by Time Team and by Nova and National Geographic. Residencies for six visual artists were arranged by Artists in Archaeology, to explore connections between archaeological processes and artistic practices.

In 2008, and again in 2009, the team excavated the remains of a henge beside the river, about 1 mile (1.6 km) south-east of Stonehenge. The discovery attracted media coverage and the name "Bluehenge" or "Bluestonehenge".

== Stonehenge as a cemetery ==
Stonehenge is effectively Britain's largest third millennium BC cemetery, containing 52 cremation burials and many other fragments of both burnt and unburnt bone. Many of the cremation deposits contained more than one individual, so that an estimate of the number of people buried here during that period may be between 150 and 240. In 2007 the Stonehenge Riverside Project and the Beaker People Project jointly embarked upon a radiocarbon dating programme of the surviving skeletal remains to establish when Stonehenge was used as a burial space. As a result of this, it is argued that the site began as a cremation cemetery in the early third millennium BC.

== Conclusion ==
The research concluded that Stonehenge was built to unify the people of Stone Age Britain. The results were published in a 2012 book Stonehenge, Exploring the Greatest Stone Age Mystery by Mike Parker Pearson.
