= Mike Parker Pearson =

English archaeologist (born 1957)

Mike Parker Pearson FSA FSA Scot FBA
- Mike Parker Pearson, 2026
- Born: Michael Parker Pearson; 26 June 1957 (age 69); Wantage, Berkshire, UK
- Known for: Stonehenge Riverside Project

Academic background
- Education: University of Southampton; King's College, Cambridge
- Thesis: Death, society and social change: the Iron Age of southern Jutland 200 B.C.-600 A.D. (1985)

Academic work
- Discipline: Archaeologist
- Sub-discipline: Prehistory; funerary archaeology
- School or tradition: Post-processual archaeology
- Institutions: English Heritage; University of Sheffield; Institute of Archaeology, University College London
- Doctoral students: Melanie Giles

Michael Parker Pearson, FSA, FSA Scot, FBA (born 26 June 1957) is an English archaeologist specialising in the study of the Neolithic British Isles, Madagascar and the archaeology of death and burial. A professor at the UCL Institute of Archaeology, he previously worked for 25 years as a professor at the University of Sheffield in England, and was the director of the Stonehenge Riverside Project. A prolific author, he has also written a variety of books on the subject.

A media personality, Parker Pearson has appeared several times in the Channel 4 show Time Team in particular in one looking at the excavation of Durrington Walls in Wiltshire. He also appeared in the National Geographic Channel documentary Stonehenge Decoded, along with the PBS programme Nova: Secrets of Stonehenge.

== Early life and education ==
Parker Pearson was born in 1957, in Wantage, Berkshire. He would later inform interviewers that he first took an interest in the past when searching for fossils in his father's driveway gravel aged 4, extending that interest into the human past aged 6 when he read a library book entitled Fun with Archaeology. Deciding to study the subject at the undergraduate level, he attended the University of Southampton, attaining a first class BA with honours in Archaeology in 1979.

He obtained his PhD from King's College, Cambridge in 1985, for a thesis titled "Death, society and social change: the Iron Age of southern Jutland 200 BC – 600 AD" in which he discussed what was known about the bog bodies of Iron Age Denmark; it would remain unpublished. Supervised by Ian Hodder as a postgraduate at Cambridge, Parker Pearson was a contemporary of Sheena Crawford, Daniel Miller, Henrietta Moore, Christopher Tilley and Alice Welbourn; these students were influenced by Hodder's ideas, then a pioneering part of the post-processualist current within archaeological theory.

Parker Pearson became interested in Marxism. In the 1984 anthology Ideology, Power and Prehistory, edited by Daniel Miller and Christopher Tilley, Parker Pearson published a paper in which he examined the pre-state societies of Jutland from a Marxist perspective. At the start of this paper, he noted that it had repercussions for Marxism in that its findings discerned "a certain blurring between capitalism and non-capitalism."

== Early career ==
From 1984 through to 1990, Parker Pearson worked as an Inspector of Monuments for English Heritage, and in 1989 he received membership to the Institute for Archaeologists. In 1990, he secured an academic teaching position at the Department of Archaeology at the University of Sheffield, where he would work for the next 21 years. In 1991 he was admitted as a Fellow of the Society of Antiquaries of London, and in 1996 then became a Fellow of the Society of Antiquaries of Scotland.

== Stonehenge Riverside Project and UCL ==
From 2003 through to 2009, Parker Pearson directed the Stonehenge Riverside Project. The project garnered three major archaeological awards: the Andante Travel Archaeology Award (2008), the Royal Society of Northern Antiquaries Award (2009), and the UK Archaeological Research Project of the Year (2010). His work in leading the project also led to Parker Pearson being personally awarded the UK Archaeologist of the Year award in 2010.

Parker Pearson and his team of researchers played a key role in the discovery of a new henge site along the River Avon that links to Stonehenge. This new site was uncovered through excavation during the Stonehenge Riverside Project and was given the name "BlueStoneHenge" or "BlueHenge" because traces of bluestones were found during the excavation.

During 2017 and 2018, excavations by his UCL team led to a proposal that the site at Waun Mawn, in the Preseli Hills of Pembrokeshire, had originally housed a 110 m (360 ft) diameter stone circle of the same size as the ditch at Stonehenge The archaeologists also postulated that the circle also contained a hole from one stone which had a distinctive pentagonal shape, very closely matching the one pentagonal stone at Stonehenge (stone hole 91 at Waun Mawn and stone 62 at Stonehenge). Both circles appear, according to some researchers, to be oriented towards the midsummer solstice. and reported in New Scientist on 20 February 2021.

Two geological articles published in 2022 proved that there was no link between Waun Mawn and the supposed "bluestone quarries" at Craig Rhosyfelin and Carn Goedog, and no link between Waun Mawn and Stonehenge. In a 2024 study published in The Holocene, Brian John re-examined the geological and archaeological evidence from the site, and concluded that the "lost circle" of standing stones had never existed, and that there was no evidence to demonstrate a link with Stonehenge. He concluded that there had been considerable "interpretative inflation" at the site, driven by a desire to show a Stonehenge connection.

== Other activities ==
From 2006 through to 2009, he served as the vice-president of the Prehistoric Society. Interacting with various parts of the media, Parker Pearson has published articles in a variety of different sources, such as on the BBC website, has given interviews to groups such as Pagans for Archaeology and most recently discussed his career in an interview with Papers from the Institute of Archaeology.

In 2012, Parker Pearson left the University of Sheffield and began teaching at the Institute of Archaeology, University College London, as Professor of British Later Prehistory.

On 16 July 2015, he was elected a Fellow of the British Academy (FBA).

== Bibliography ==
Title	Year	Co-author(s)	Publisher	ISBN
Bronze Age Britain	1993	n/a	English Heritage and B.T. Batsford	978-0713468564
Architecture and Order: Approaches to Social Space	1994	Colin Richards (edited volume)	Routledge	978-0415067287
The Archaeology of Death and Burial	1999	n/a	Sutton Publishing	978-0890969267
Between Land and Sea: Excavations at Dun Vulan, South Uist	1999	Niall Sharples, Jacqui Mulville, Helen Smith, (edited volume)	Sheffield Academic Press	978-1850758808
In Search of the Red Slave: Shipwreck and Captivity in Madagascar	2002	Karen Godden	Sutton Publishing	978-0750929387
Food, Culture and Identity in the Neolithic and Early Bronze Age	2003		British Archaeological Reports	978-1841714950
Fiskerton: An Iron Age Timber Causeway with Iron Age and Roman Votive Offerings	2003	Naomi Field	Oxbow	978-1842170649
South Uist: Archaeology and History of a Hebridean Island	2004	Niall Sharples and Jim Symonds	The History Press	978-0752429052
Warfare, Violence and Slavery in Prehistory: Proceedings of a Prehistoric Society Conference at Sheffield University	2005	I.J.N. Thorpe (edited volume)	British Archaeological Reports	978-1841718163
From Stonehenge to the Baltic: Living with Cultural Diversity in the Third Millennium BC	2007	Mats Larsson	British Archaeological Reports	978-1407301303
Pastoralists, Warriors and Colonists: The Archaeology of Southern Madagascar	2010	Karen Godden (edited volume)	British Archaeological Reports	978-1407306803
If Stones Could Speak: Unlocking the Secrets of Stonehenge	2010	Marc Aronson	National Geographic Society	978-1426305993
Stonehenge: Exploring the Greatest Stone Age Enigma	2012	n/a	Simon & Schuster	978-0857207302
From Machair to Mountains: Archaeological Survey and Excavation in South Uist	2012	(edited volume)	Oxbow	978-1842174517
