= Durrington Walls =

Late Neolithic palisaded enclosure

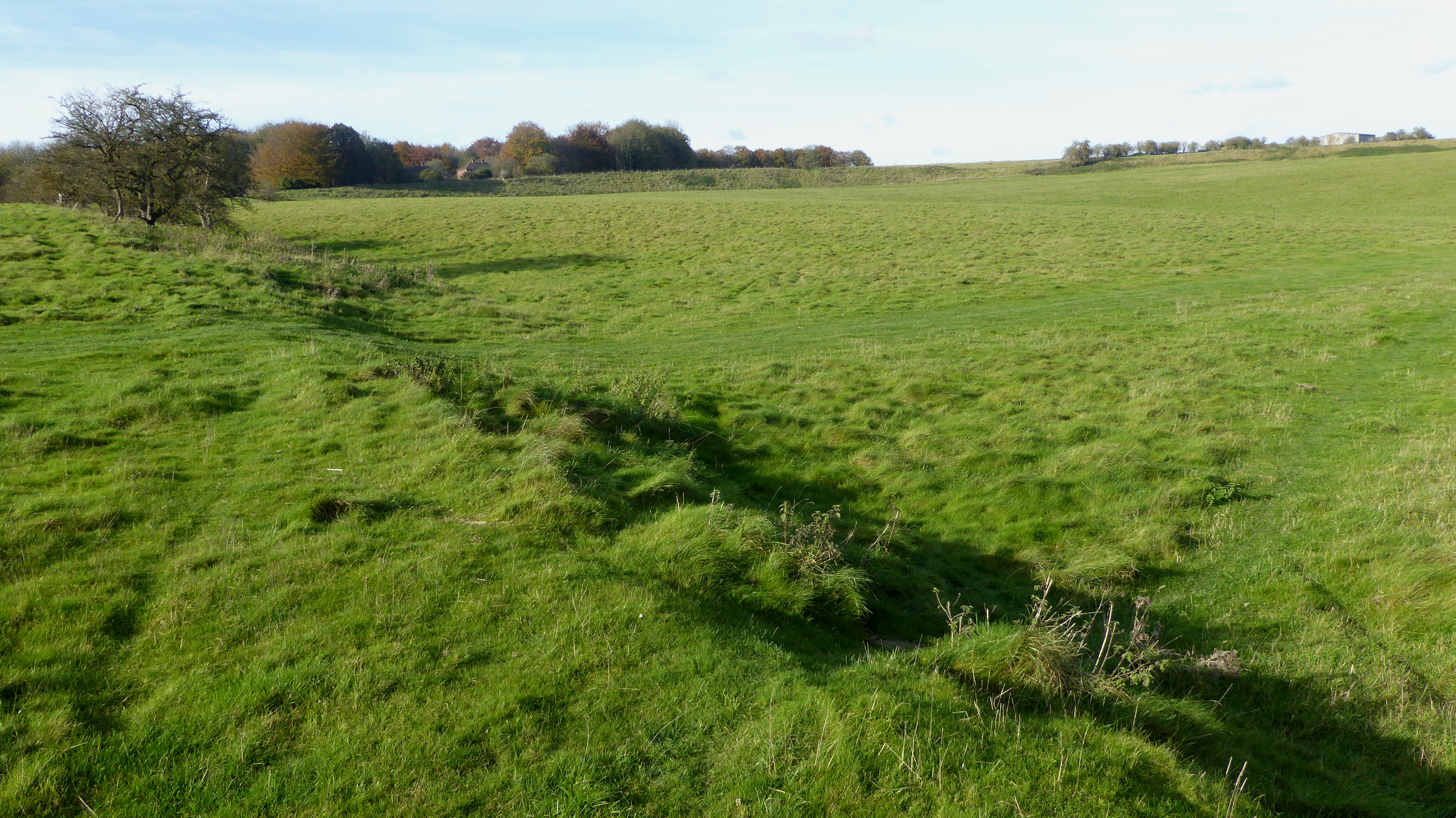
- Southern Wall of Durrington Walls

- 51.1925°N 1.7875°W
- Type: henge
- Periods: Neolithic
- Region: Wiltshire

Site notes
- Excavation dates: 1966-7, 2003–
- Archaeologists: G.J. Wainwright, Stonehenge Riverside Project
- Condition: eroded banks and ditch
- Public access: Yes
- Website: National Trust

UNESCO World Heritage Site
- Designated: 1986
- Reference no.: 373

Scheduled monument
- Designated: 1929
- Reference no.: 1009133

Durrington Walls is the site of a large Neolithic settlement and later henge enclosure located in the Stonehenge World Heritage Site in England. It lies 2 miles (3.2 km) north-east of Stonehenge in the parish of Durrington, just north of Amesbury in Wiltshire. The henge is the second-largest Late Neolithic palisaded enclosure known in the United Kingdom, after Hindwell in Wales.

Between 2004 and 2006, excavations on the site by a team led by the University of Sheffield revealed seven houses. It has been suggested that the settlement may have originally had up to 1,000 houses and perhaps 4,000 people, if the entire enclosed area was used. The site was settled for about 500 years, starting sometime between c. 2800 and 2100 BC.

The site may have been the largest settlement in northern Europe for a brief period. From 2010 to 2014, a combination of new technology and excavations revealed a 500-metre-diameter (1,600 ft) henge constructed largely of wooden posts. Evidence suggests that this complex was a complementary monument to Stonehenge.

In 2020, a geophysical survey uncovered a number of pits, some natural sink holes and others apparently modified to hold massive timbers, interpreted as belonging to a 1.2-mile-wide (1.9 km) circle or circuit of 10-metre (33 ft) pits of Neolithic age. If this interpretation is correct, this would be Britain's largest prehistoric monument.

== Etymology ==
The name comes from the civil parish in which the site is located – Durrington, meaning "the farm of the deer people" (deor – deer, ing – people/tribe, tun – farm/settlement) – and the large henge banks that surround it. The "Dur" prefix is commonly found in this part of England; the Durotriges Celtic tribe inhabited this area before their defeat by the Romans in the mid first-century C.E. Also, Dorchester was originally known as Durnovaria, and smaller settlements with related names (e.g., Durweston) and locations (e.g., Durborough Farm) are found in this region.

== Context ==
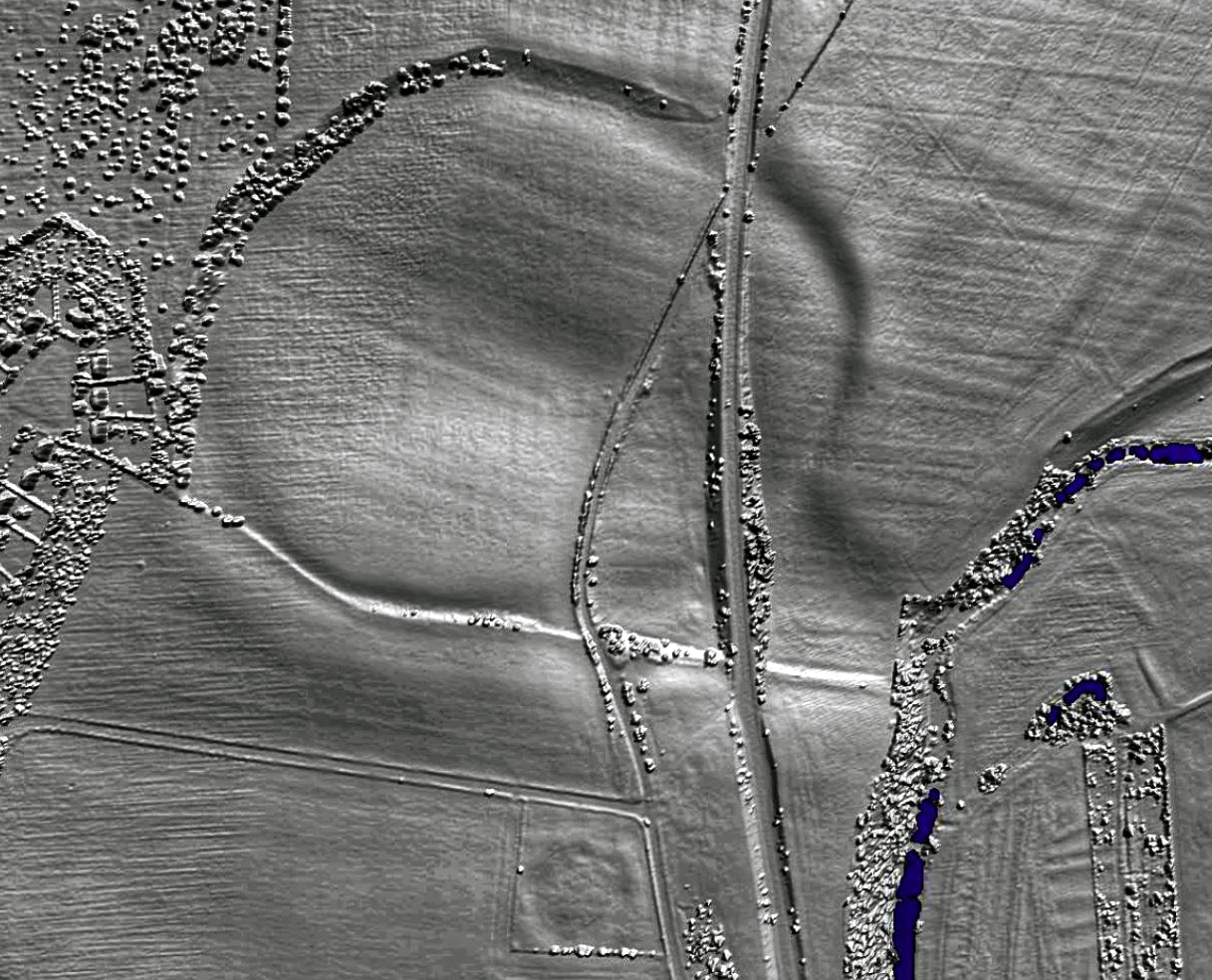
A lidar view of Durrington Walls and Woodhenge

What visibly remains of Durrington Walls today is the 'walls' of the henge monument – the eroded remains of the inner slope of the bank and the outer slope of the internal ditch. This now appears as a ridge surrounding a central basin. On the eastern side, the separate ditch and bank are much more discernible, although badly eroded by ploughing. Originally the ditch was 5.5 metres (18 ft) deep, 7 metres (23 ft) wide at its bottom and 18 metres (59 ft) wide at the top. The bank was in some areas 30 metres (98 ft) wide. There were two entrances through the bank and ditch – at the north western and south eastern ends. There may also have been an entrance to the south and the north east, although these may have been deliberately blocked.

The henge enclosed several timber circles and smaller enclosures – not all of which have been excavated. Several Neolithic house floors have been found next to and under the eastern bank of the henge. Their density suggests that there was a very large village on the sloping river bank on this side.

The henge was constructed on high ground that slopes south east toward a bend in the River Avon, and is thus considerably higher at its north western side than at its south eastern edge. The south eastern entrance is roughly 60 metres (200 ft) from the riverbank.

The henge has two roads passing through it – an old toll road, and a modern banked road constructed in 1967. In the past, military barracks were constructed at the north eastern end of the henge. Some houses were built on the western bank. The land on the western side of the toll road is owned by the National Trust, forming part of its Stonehenge Landscape property. It has free entry.

== History ==
Although there is evidence of some early Neolithic activity at the site, most of the structures seem to have been built in the late Neolithic/early Bronze Age. At some point c. 2600 BC, a large timber circle was constructed. It is now known as the Southern Circle. The circle was oriented southeast towards the sunrise on the midwinter solstice. Its four large concentric circles of postholes would have held extremely large standing timbers.

A paved avenue was constructed on a slightly different alignment – towards the sunset on the summer solstice – and it led to the River Avon. This feature is similar to the Stonehenge Avenue. A large timber post lay on this orientation, about as far away from the circle as the Heelstone is from Stonehenge.

At a similar time, but probably after the circle and avenue were constructed, a village began to develop around the site. Excavations have revealed seven Neolithic house floors on the eastern side of the bank. Some of these floors were located underneath the henge bank, suggesting that settlement came first. The density of some of the houses suggests that there are many more house floors under the field east of the henge, along the banks of the River Avon. One of the homes excavated showed evidence of a cobb wall and its own ancillary building, and was very similar in layout to a house at Skara Brae in Orkney. The other houses seem to have had simple wattle and daub walls. Evidence also suggests that the houses continued to the north of the site.

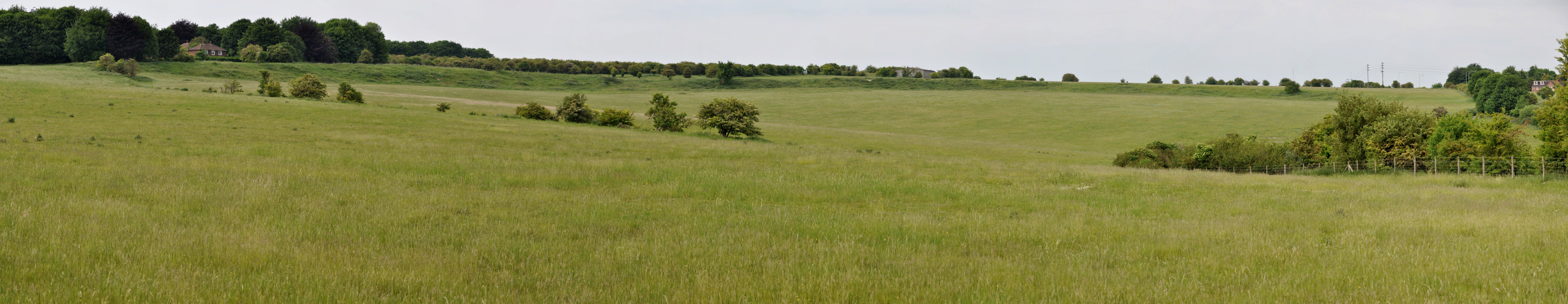
Durrington Walls seen from Woodhenge

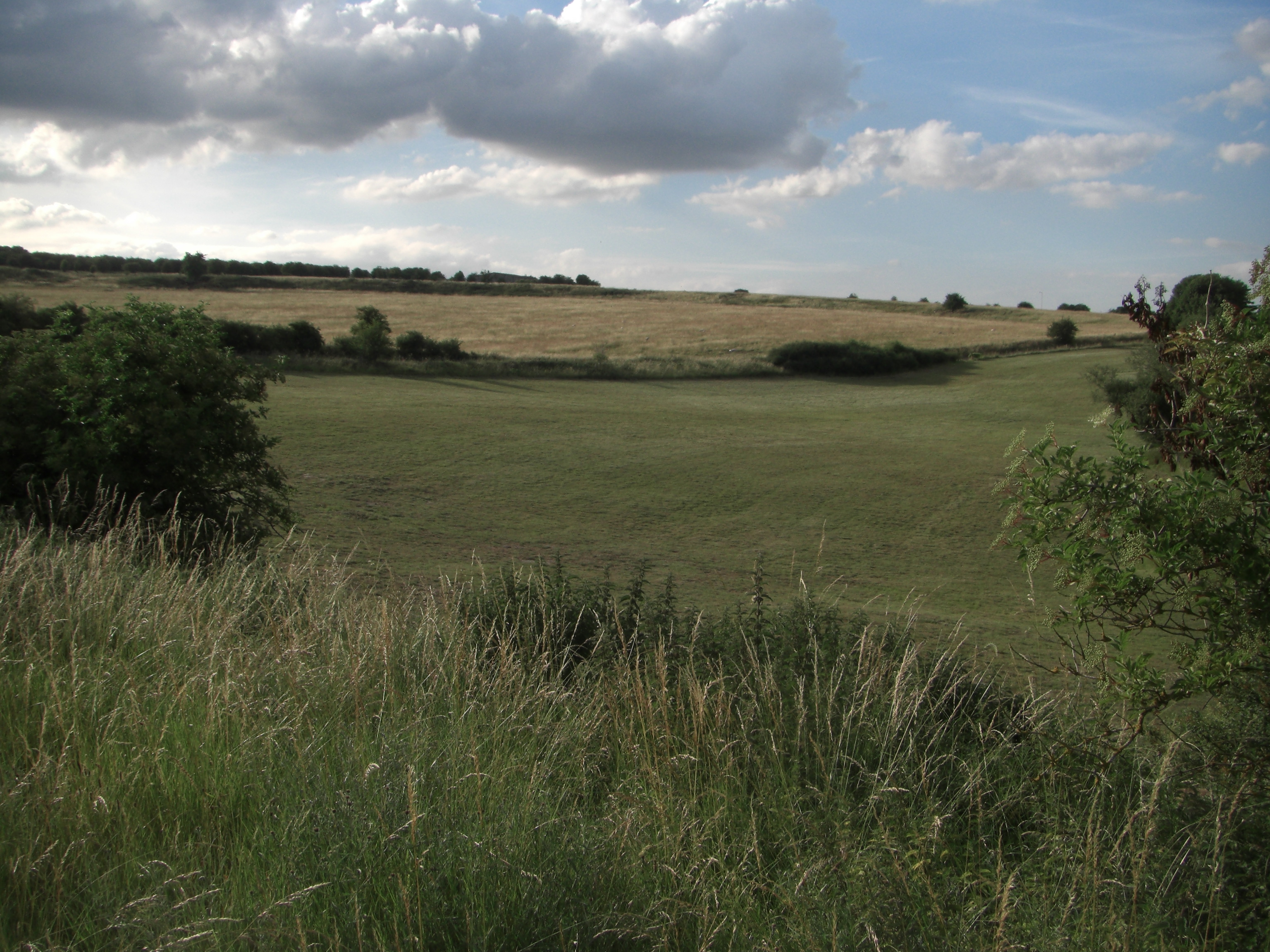
Durrington Walls, as seen from the south of the monument. It is bisected here to the left by one of the two roads that now cross the prehistoric site.

It is probable that the village surrounded a large, circular, open area that contained the Southern Circle and several smaller enclosures. A geophysical survey of the area 200 metres (660 ft) west of the Southern Circle, known as the western enclosures, showed "a group of at least six penannular structures ... arranged around a terrace overlooking the timber circle and the eastern entrance". An excavation revealed two houses set within timber palisades and ditched enclosures that appear to have been kept clean. These may have held elite occupants or might have been shrines, cult-houses, or spirit lodges.

Julian Thomas notes that

"Overall, the evidence from the internal structures at Durrington Walls does not show that this was a 'ritual site', for there is no such thing. There are simply sites at which ritual has taken place, and at Durrington a variety of acts of various degrees of ritualization, from formal rites to habitual practices, were woven into a complicated history, marking moments of crisis, transformation, and daily routine."

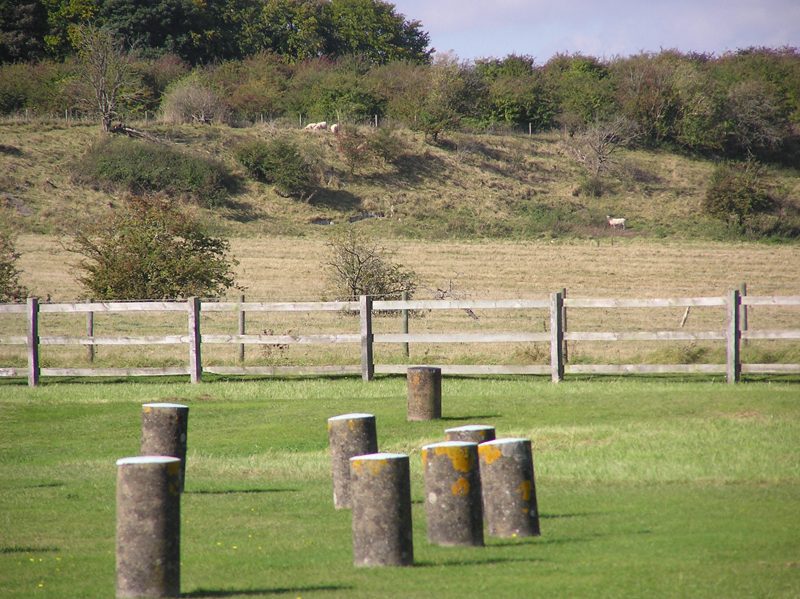
Durrington Walls, seen from Woodhenge

Sometime later, perhaps 200 years after the circle was first constructed, another two concentric rings were added, and the henge enclosure was constructed. A ditch some 5.5 m (18 ft) deep was dug, and the earth used to create a large outer bank some 30 m (98 ft) wide and presumably several metres high. Several features of the village, including houses and midden pits, were built over. The henge seems to have been built in one continuous operation, not in phases, as there is no evidence of soil or turf developing in the bank. The ditch also seems to have been dug in sections, perhaps by different groups of labourers. Estimates of the number of people required to create the henge vary from 4000 to 6000. At a similar time, another large timber circle and henge were created immediately south at Woodhenge.

It is unknown when the site fell out of use. It was re-occupied during the Iron Age, when a settlement and field system was established inside the henge. A large drainage ditch was also dug above the north eastern entrance, possibly to complement the field system.

== Excavations and theories ==
Sunrise at the Durrington Walls reconstruction, produced for an episode of Time Team aired in 2005

Richard Colt Hoare noted Durrington Walls in 1810, and observed that centuries of agriculture had left "its form much mutilated". Geoffrey Wainwright excavated the route of the new A345 in 1966. He discovered the southern timber circle of Durrington Walls, as well as a smaller one slightly north of it.

Since 2003 the Stonehenge Riverside Project, led by Mike Parker Pearson, has carried out annual excavations at Durrington Walls. It identified the Neolithic village and avenue to the river.

Radiocarbon dates of approximately 2600 BC are roughly contemporary with the earliest stone phase at Stonehenge. It is likely that the builders of the stone monument lived here. Parker Pearson believes that Durrington Walls was a complementary structure to Stonehenge, as evidenced by the similar solstice alignments. He suggests that the timber circle at Durrington Walls represented life and a land of the living, whilst Stonehenge and the down around it, encircled by burial mounds, represented a land of the dead. The two were connected by the River Avon and their respective avenues. A ceremonial procession route from one to the other represented the transition from life to death.

Geoff Wainwright and Timothy Darvill have contested Pearson's theories, however. They suggest that Stonehenge was a monument to healing and that connections between the two monuments were unlikely.

Pig bones at Durrington Walls have been interpreted as having come from many different sites around Britain. However, other interpretations of the same evidence suggest that the animals came from a much more limited area.

=== Palisaded enclosure ===
In 2015 an announcement was made by The Stonehenge Hidden Landscapes Project that a geophysical survey showed evidence of another monument consisting of up to 90 standing stones buried under Durrington Walls. In August 2016 a joint project excavation, directed by Parker Pearson and members of the Stonehenge Hidden Landscapes Project, revealed that there are no buried standing stones at Durrington Walls.

Ground-penetrating radar results revealed a circle of enormous post-holes, not buried stones, beneath the henge bank which had later been filled with chalk rubble. National Trust archaeologist Dr. Nicola Snashall, suggested that as soon as the builders of Stonehenge abandoned their settlement on the site, a large timber monument was constructed and approximately 50 years later, "For some strange reason they took the timbers out and put up the enormous bank and ditch that we see today."

The ring of around 300 huge trunks stood on the same line where the Durrington Walls outer bank now stands. Each trunk was approximately 1.5 metres (4 ft 11 in) in diameter and 7 metres (23 ft) high, creating a palisaded enclosure similar to those more usually found in the north and west of Britain in the Neolithic. Around fifty years after construction (too soon for the wood to have rotted away) the trunks appear to have been carefully lifted from their holes, which were then re-filled with rammed chalk. It was this that had given a misleading geophysics signal. It is speculated that the wooden trunks could have been re-used in the 'Southern Timber Circle'. Meanwhile the outer perimeter was converted from a timber palisade to a huge henge bank, backed by a 5 metres (16 ft) deep ditch encircling the site. It is unknown what might be the motivation for such an abrupt change some time around 2450 BC. Cultural or theological shifts, new leaders wishing to stamp their mark, the arrival of new peoples, or simply shifting fashions of the time are all possibilities that are offered. However evidence from the excavated examples indicate a careful removal of the posts and retention of the line of the palisade for the new feature, both of which suggest an orderly transition of some sort.

=== Late Neolithic pit structure ===
A map of the Durrington Walls area, showing a series of large pits, positioned an average of 864 metres from the Durrington Walls boundary, and thought to date to the late Neolithic. Pits 1A to 9A were found during a 2012-13 SHLP wide area magnetic survey. Pits 10D to 15D are other pits, identified by various investigations. The features labeled i to v are additional features of similar size and form and on the same arc. All the pits shown appear to be in the range of 10 to 23 metres across, and those that have been augured or core-sampled seem to go down at least 5 metres.
[Click to Show/Hide gazetteer list of the pit features]
* SHLP = Stonehenge Hidden Landscapes Project
* NMP = National Mapping Programme (English Heritage)
* WA = Wessex Archaeology. (Developer-led investigations)
1A SHLP 2012-13: 18m diameter. (First observed mid-1990s)
2A SHLP 2012-13: 16m diameter pit-like anomaly.
3A SHLP 2012-13: 17m diameter pit-like anomaly.
4A SHLP 2012-13: 19m diameter. NMP 2002 noted a circular crop mark.
5A SHLP 2012-13: 14m diameter pit-like anomaly. Core sampling went down below 6m but failed to identify a clear breakpoint.
6A SHLP 2012-13: 19m diameter pit-like anomaly. Scheduled ancient monument described in 1979 as ring-ditch or round barrow
7A SHLP 2012-13: 15m diameter pit-like anomaly. Core sampling reached bedrock at 4.8m
8A SHLP 2012-13: 18m diameter pit-like anomaly. Core sampling reached bedrock at 4.8m
9A SHLP 2012-13: 18m diameter pit-like anomaly. Scheduled in 1995 as bowl barrow. NMP 2002 crop mark.
10D SHLP 2014: 22m diameter pit, excavated to 2m in 2016 but 'not bottomed'.
11D SHLP 2014: 18m diameter pit, excavated to 1.5m in 2016 but 'not bottomed'.
12D SHLP 2014: 20m diameter pit or infilled solution hollow
13D SHLP 2014: 15m diameter pit or infilled solution hollow
14D WA excavation 2018, in advance of development. 23m pit narrowed to a 7m wide 'shaft' of unknown depth
15D WA excavation 2018, in advance of development. 20m pit excavated to 1m and centre was augered to 6m without bottoming
i SHLP 2012-13: Visible depression 17m across, but uncertain magnetic characteristics, near former railway line.
ii NMP 2002 observed circular bank, 18m across
iii WA 2016 survey observed circular feature 19m across.
iv WA 2016 survey observed ellipsoidal feature c.22m x 18m
v Disc-like crop mark of around 18m across. This was identified via Google Earth by SHLP authors (undated)

In 2020 researchers from the universities of St Andrews, Birmingham, Warwick, Bradford, Glasgow and the University of Wales Trinity Saint David announced the discovery of 20 pits at the site, and claimed that they had found Britain's largest prehistoric monument. Two groups of pits, including at least seven that appear entirely natural, were interpreted as belonging to a 1.2-mile (1.9 km)-diameter circle or circuit of large "shafts". The circuit surrounds Durrington Walls, dating from the Neolithic and estimated to be 4,500 years old. Some pits are claimed to be more than 10 metres (33 ft) in diameter and 5 metres (16 ft) in depth. The claim was supported through the use of a geophysical survey. The slow accumulation of silts within some pits suggests they were cut and then left open.

Further investigation by a team led by Vincent Gaffney in 2021 concluded that the pits were human-made, and not natural features. Optically stimulated luminescence tests revealed that soil within the pits had not been exposed to daylight since 2400 BC. Examination of the pits demonstrated they were in use from the late Neolithic until the middle Bronze Age. Gaffney described the pits as "the largest prehistoric structure found in Britain." Comparisons made in a formal paper suggest similarities – if not necessarily a sequential development – between the long established habit of mining flint from open-cut pits, and these pits, while also noting that at least some of the "mined" pits in the area were modified "solution hollows" (sometimes rendered in discussion fora as "sink holes", which is an extreme end of a spectrum of karst features). This study also reported (see fig 19) at least one of the luminescence series on cored samples as showing a natural sequential infill sequence in the top 1/4 of one core (pit 8A), underlain by an inverted exposure-age sequence in the lower part of the core. This is contrasted with pit 5A, with a more uniform natural filling profile covering almost all the depth of the pit. Evidently, some pits suffered different infill histories to other pits.

== See also ==
- Stonehenge, Avebury and Associated Sites

== Bibliography ==
- M. Parker Pearson. Bronze Age Britain. 2005. ISBN 0-7134-8849-2
- C. Chippindale. Stonehenge Complete. 1983 ISBN 0-500-28467-9
- R. Legg. Stonehenge and Avebury: The World Heritage Site. 2004. ISBN 1-84114-360-X
- D. Souden. Stonehenge: Mysteries of the Stones and Landscape. 1997. ISBN 1-85585-291-8
- M. Parker Pearson et al. "The Age of Stonehenge". 2007. Antiquity, 81(313) pp. 617–639
- M. Parker Pearson et al. The Stonehenge Riverside Project 2004 Interim Report
- M. Parker Pearson et al. The Stonehenge Riverside Project 2005 Interim Report
- M. Parker Pearson et al. The Stonehenge Riverside Project 2006 Summary Interim Report
- M. Parker Pearson. Stonehenge: Exploring the greatest Stone Age Mystery. 2012 London: Simon & Schuster.
