= Jersey dolmens =

Neolithic sites in Jersey

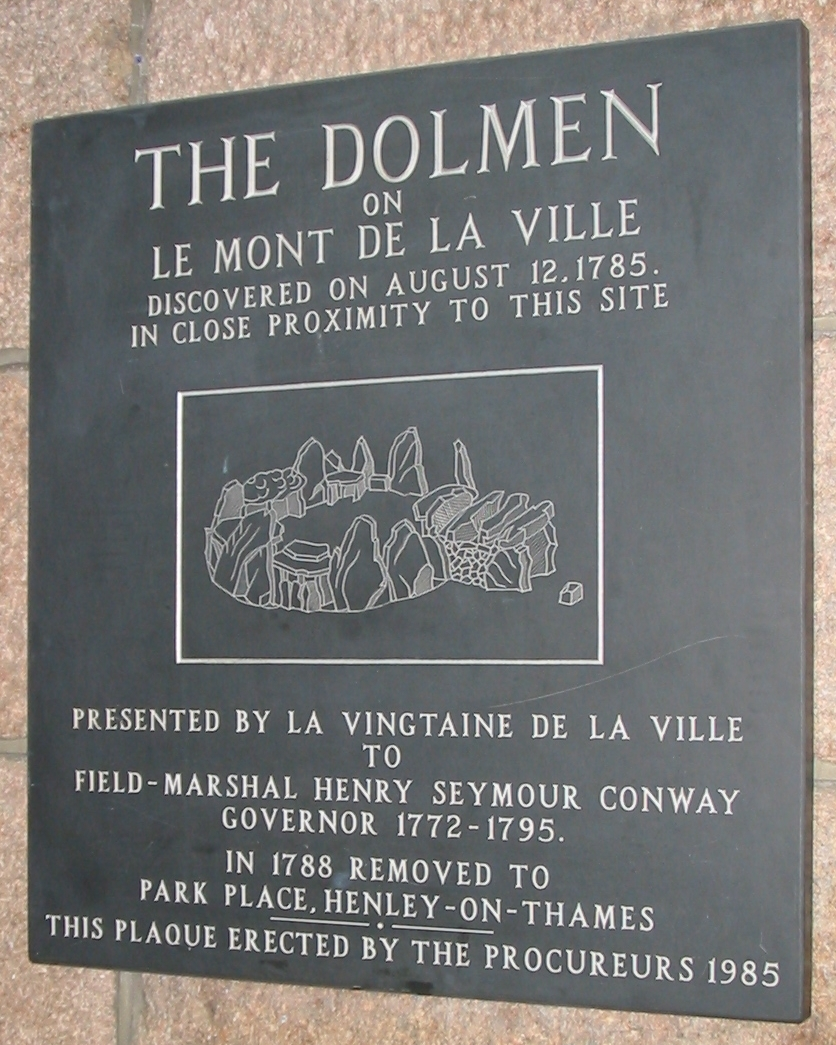
In 1785 part of Le Mont de la Ville was levelled as a parade ground, which led to the discovery of a dolmen which the Vingtaine de la Ville presented to the Lieutenant Governor of Jersey, Marshal Conway, who subsequently transported it to his estate at Henley-on-Thames where it was re-erected. As it is now a listed monument in the United Kingdom, attempts to have it returned to Jersey have been to no avail.

The dolmens of Jersey are Neolithic sites, including dolmens, in Jersey. They range over a wide period, from around 4800 BC to 2250 BC, these dates covering the periods roughly designated as Neolithic, or “new Stone Age”, to Chalcolithic, or Copper Age.

== History of dolmens in Jersey ==
By the time the dolmens came to be built, people were settled in Jersey, although it was still at that time connected by a land bridge to the continent of Europe (until around 6800 BC). The new Stone Age differs from the old in that stone tools were still used – axes, daggers etc. – but the community was now settled and farmed the land; they did not hunt and follow prey.

Of their habitations, no trace remains; it is likely from the evidence found elsewhere that they had fairly basic wooden huts, sealed with mud and clay, which have been lost. Only the dolmens and menhirs remain.

The Neolithic sites such as dolmens, passage graves, and the like used to be considered as primarily tombs of chieftains.

Possibly drawing from the Egyptian model, a tribe was imagined as labouring away to build a burial site of stone for a mighty chieftain, much as the workers in Egypt had done for the pharaohs. Beliefs of ancient Egypt have survived in written form, and it seems clear that the embalmed body of the king was entombed underneath or within the pyramid to protect it and allow his transformation and ascension to the afterlife, and a place among the gods. A new pharaoh would mean a new tomb, a new pyramid, often built in fairly close proximity to others.

But the Neolithic sites do not seem to function like that. They are scattered. There is no easy way of seeing that someone was special, singled out. Bodies were often defleshed (left so that the flesh rotted away) or burnt before interment. Ancient Jewish burials – where a tomb was used – then the bones gathered up and placed in a burial casket – show a similarity of practice.

This is also completely unlike Celtic burials, where tribal chieftains were often buried with their chariots, and grave goods (though horses were apparently usually too valuable to bury with their owner). It is immediately clear with these burials that they were for a man of stature and importance within the tribe. The one site – unfortunately inaccessible – in Jersey where this is seen is Hougue Boete.

But with the dolmens, as Mark Patton has pointed out, the human remains found are few in number, and sometimes (as La Sergenté) non-existent. This is also the case in Brittany, where animal bones can be found, and not human bones, suggesting that these "passage graves" were never intended for burials, and certainly not for burials of chieftains. On the most prominent Jersey site, he comments: “the bones are scattered in the passage and chamber with no apparent organisation, as at La Hougue Bie, Jersey”..

In fact, on many sites in Britain and Europe, over the Neolithic period, these tombs were opened and new interments made. One site had five different methods of burial for only twice that number of people.

So if these sites were not tombs, what were they for? Mark Patton suggest that a useful analogy is that of churches and cathedrals. He argues: "If one were to excavate Westminster Abbey, one would find human bones, as in most cathedrals and churches, yet Westminster Abbey, although it contains burials, would not in itself be described as a tomb or mausoleum", and suggests that we look at the dolmens in this light. The historian Ronald Hutton comes to much the same conclusion, that these sites were mainly used as religious centres, and each would have been a "focus for a group of scattered farms or a settlement, bonded as a clan or family" - very much a precursor to the idea of a "parish".

To understand the dolmens, Mark Patton suggests imagining the tribes coming together, for various significant times of the year, to celebrate, with rituals, the passage of the seasons.

Bihet notes that pouques or fairies have a particularly strong connection to the folklore of the dolmens.

== Sites ==
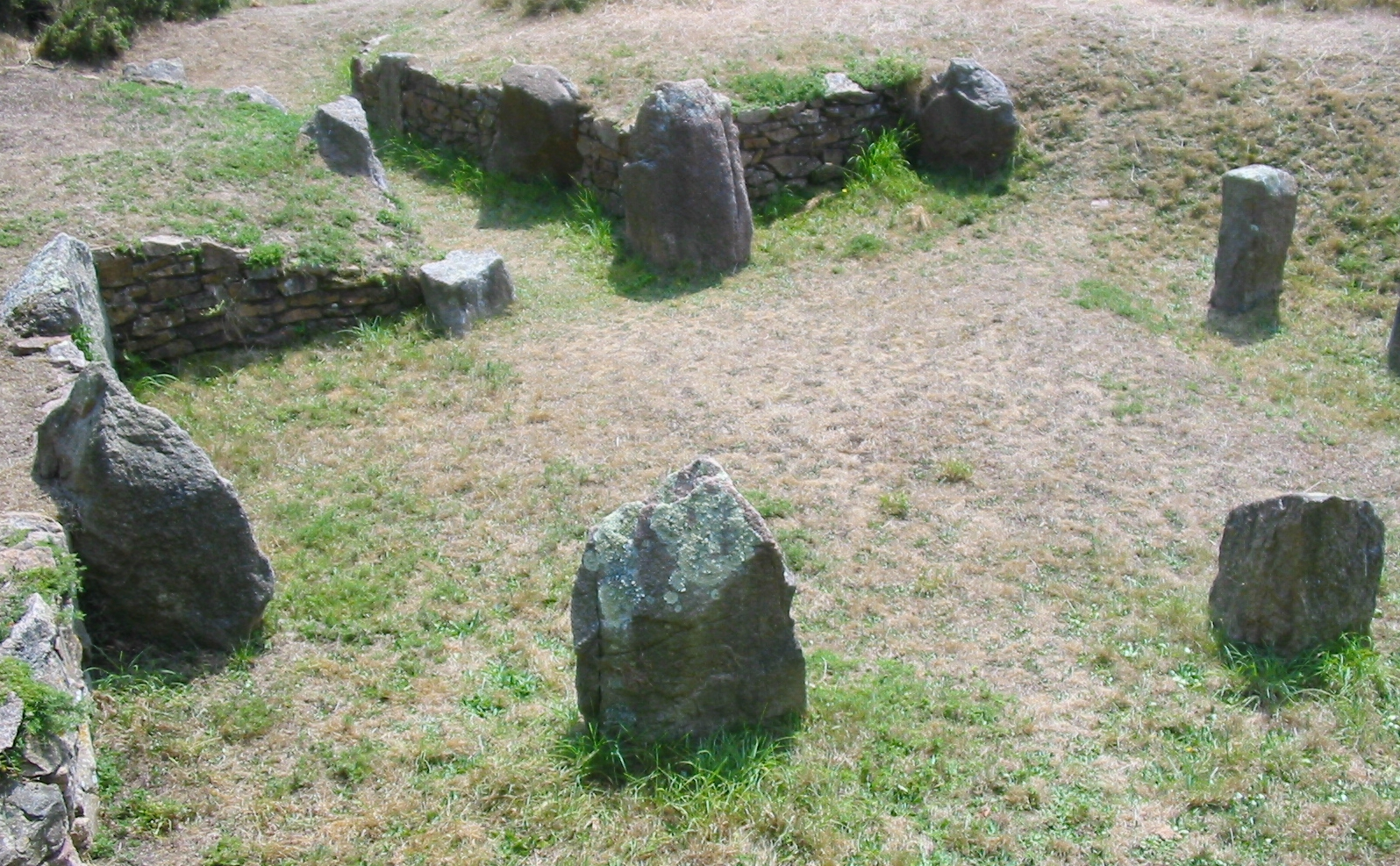
La Hougue des Géonnais

The major sites in Jersey are listed below:

- La Hougue Bie
- La Pouquelaye de Faldouet
- Le Mont Ubé
- Le Couperon
- La Sergenté
- Les Mont de Grantez
- La Hougue des Géonnais
- Ville-ès-Nouaux
- The Broken Menhir
- The Ossuary
- The Little Menhir
- The Great Menhir
- La Table des Marthes
- Les Trois Rocques
- Le Pinacle

=== La Pouquelaye de Faldouet ===
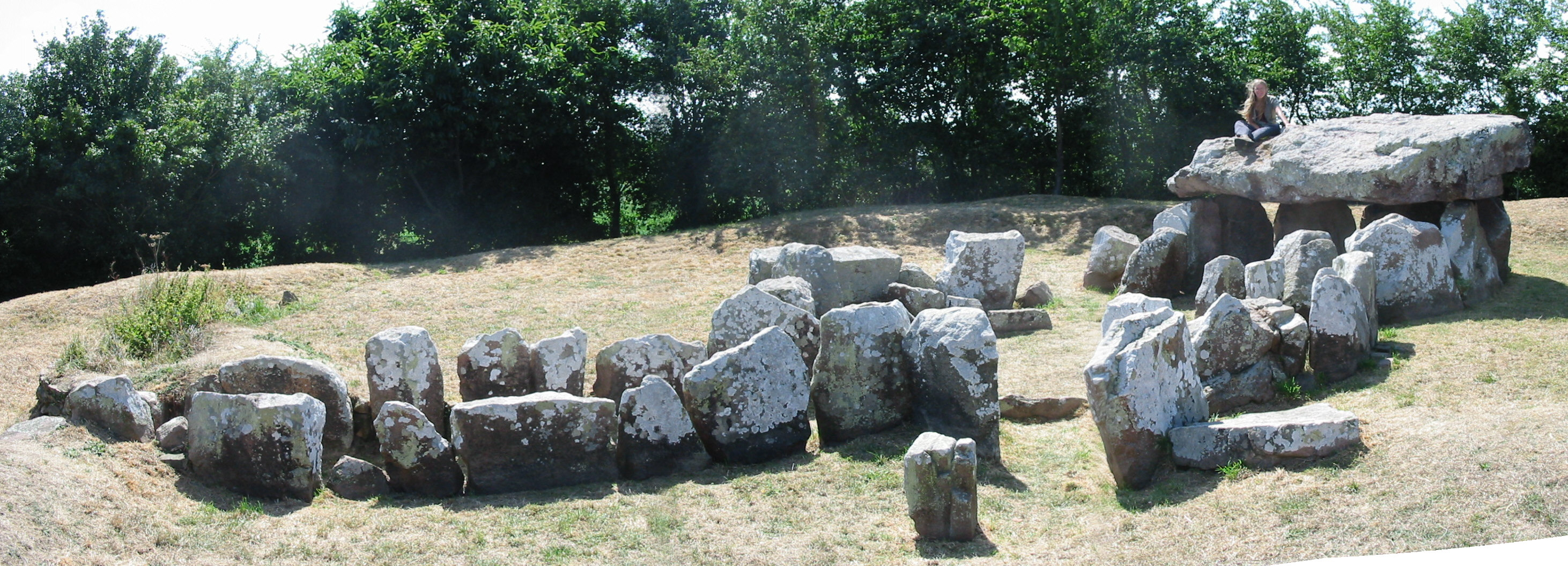
La Pouquelaye de Faldouet

This Neolithic passage grave is in the Parish of St Martin. It is a 5 metre long passage leading into a large circular chamber beyond which is a large capstoned end chamber. Several smaller side chambers and cists form the edges of the main chamber. Human bones from at least three individuals have been recovered as well as pottery, stone axes and flints. It is depicted on 10 pence coins.

=== Les Monts de Grantez ===
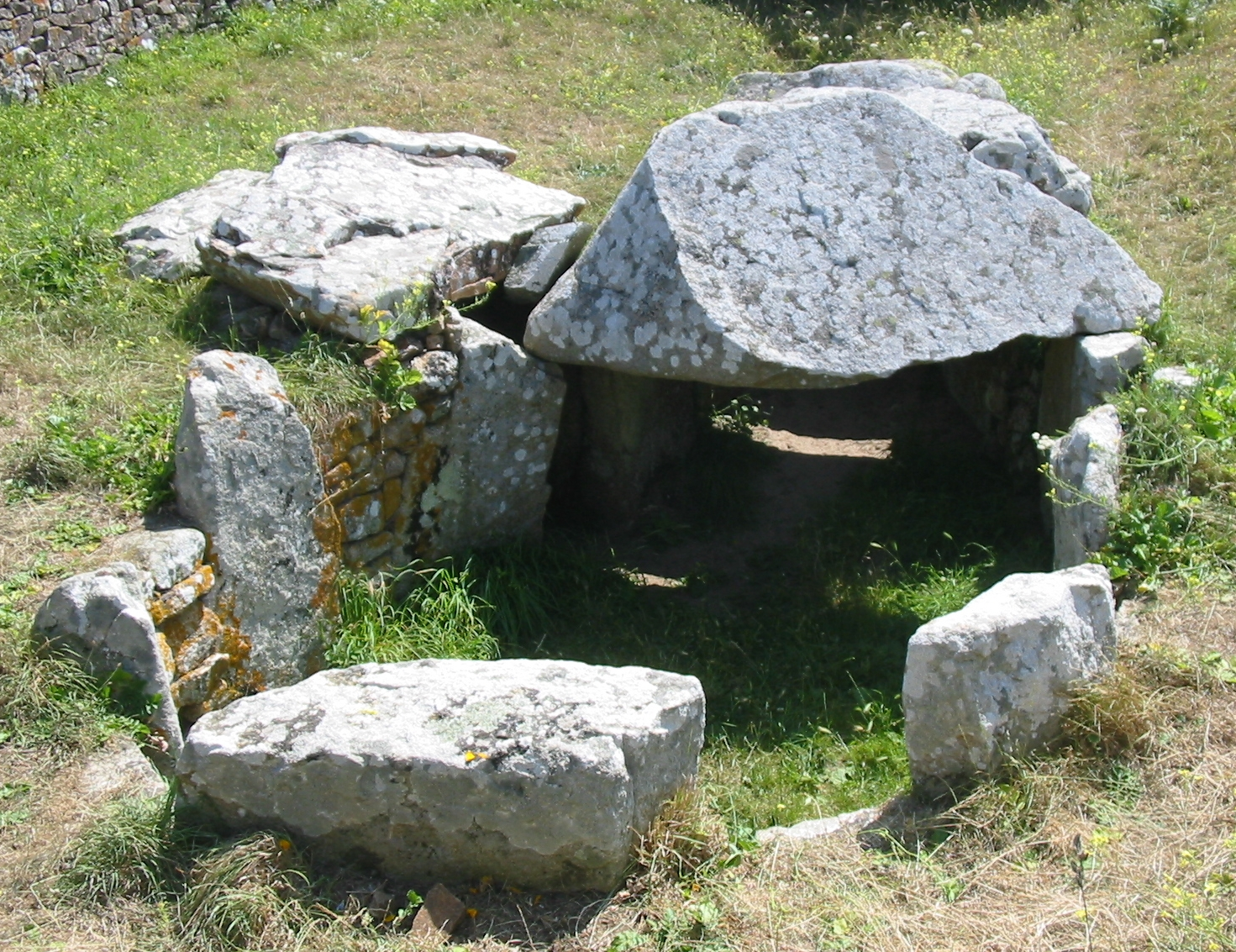
Les Monts Grantez

This Neolithic passage grave is in the Parish of St Ouen.

It has a fine passage chamber with one side chamber to the north. The passage and side chamber retain their capstones. Excavation in 1912 located the skeletons of eight people, seven adult and one child. Seven were lying on their sides in a crouched position and the eighth in a seated position within the passage. Animal bones, pottery, shells and pebbles were also found.

Mark Patton (1987) noted that there was a considerable degree of variation in terms of funerary practices and how the dead were treated. In Mont Grantez, "seven articulated skeletons were found (six were in flexed positions in the chamber, the seventh was apparently placed in a seated position in the chamber). Disarticulated remains, however, are more usual, suggesting prior exposure or burial of the corpse."

=== La Sergenté ===
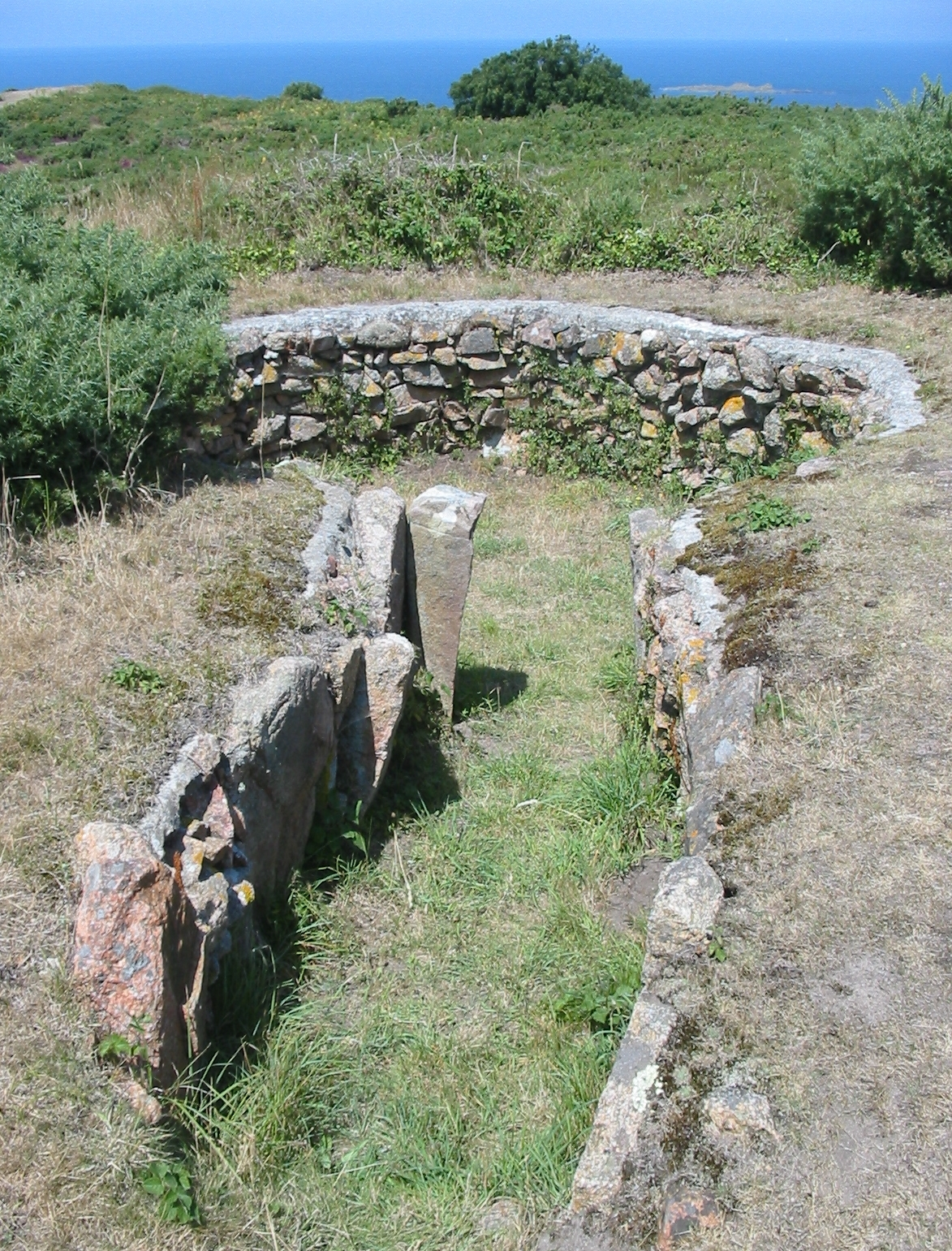
La Sergenté

This unusual passage grave is found in the Parish of St Brelade. It is a circular chamber with a short passage entrance. The original excavation in 1923 found a large amount of rubble within that was probably the fallen remains of a corbelled, bee-hive shaped vault. The style is unique to the Channel Islands.

It is sited on open land west of Le Parcq de L'Oeillière, with a line of sight to La Table des Marthes.

Mark Patton noted that the corbelled vault required a rock such as schist, which fractures to give long, flat slabs, and in Jersey, the available rock was not suitable. Consequently, while La Sergenté is the earliest passage grave in Jersey, it collapsed soon after its construction, because of the unsuitable building materials available, and was not repeated elsewhere in the Islands.(Patton 1987a).

=== La Hougue des Géonnais ===
A neolithic passage chamber in the parish of St Ouen; it was largely ruined by quarrying prior to the initial excavation in 1929. More recent excavations (1985-1990) revealed a D-shaped chamber that was extended to form an open rectangular chamber probably in Neolithic times. A vast number of finds included pottery, flint scrapers, arrowheads and broken querns.

Mark Patton comments: “There are three passage graves in Jersey (Le Mont de la Ville, Faldouet and La Hougue des Géonnais) which have large, open chambers. The chambers of these monuments cannot have been roofed with capstones (the uprights are too small to have supported capstones large enough to span the chambers), and corbelled vaulting would be impractical given the character of the available stone. It is conceivable that these chambers had wooden roofs, but recent excavations at La Hougue des Géonnais provided no evidence for this. Assuming that the chambers were open, the cairns of these monuments cannot have covered the chambers whilst they were in use, and must rather have formed a sort of platform around an open ‘arena’.”

=== La Table des Marthes ===
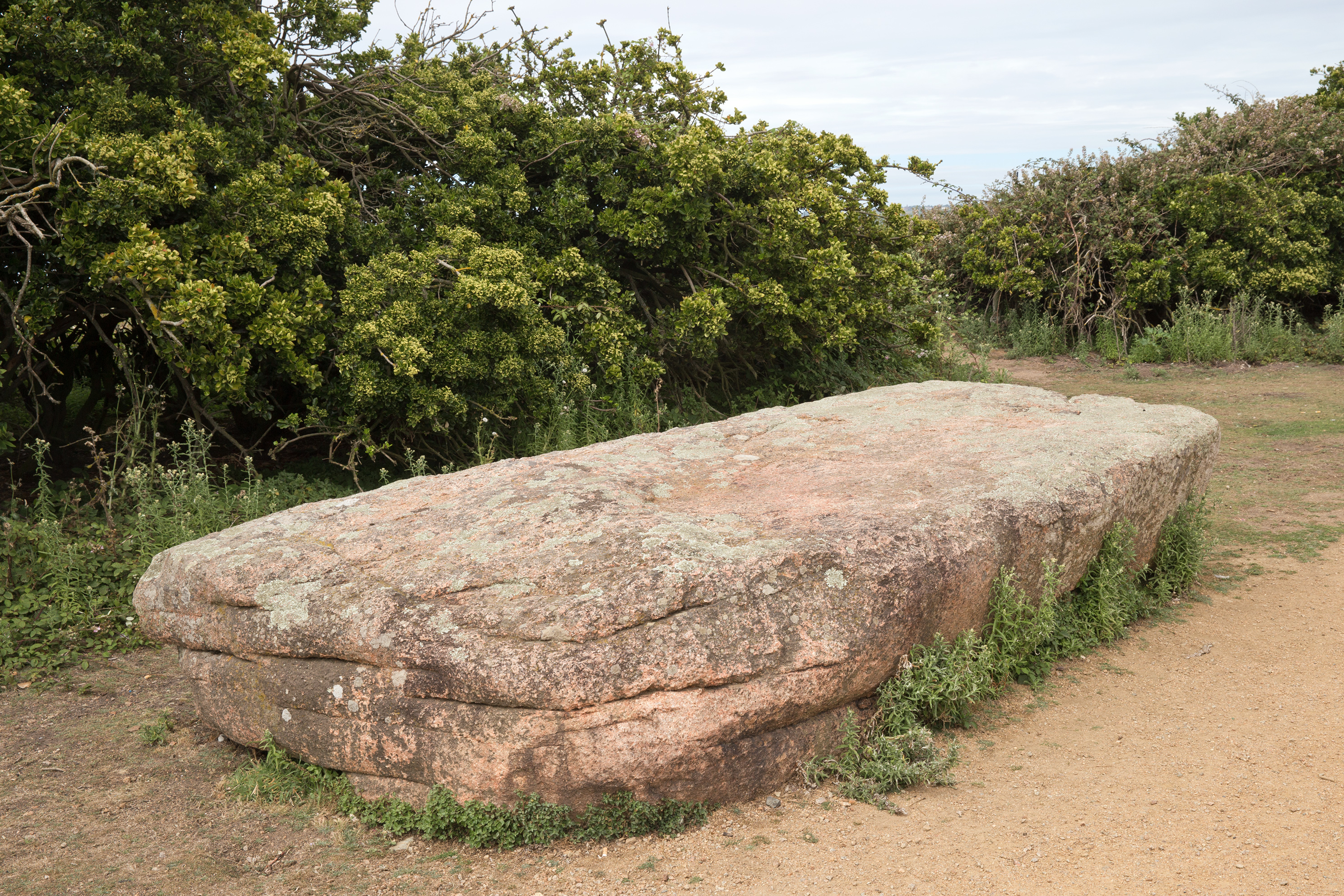
La Table des Marthes

A large flat granite slab at the western end of The Railway Walk where it meets La Rue de la Corbière. When examined in 1850 it was found to be supported at each end by pillars of stones and earth. Pottery, burnt stones and broken stone axes were found. It is unknown what kind of purpose it was used for or what kind of structure it is part of.

It has been suggested that it is a huge capstone from the late Neolithic or early Bronze Age (about 2500 to 3000 BC). In historical times, it was used by the Jersey people as a place for signing contracts. Because of this it may have been allowed to stand by the side of the now disused St Helier to La Corbière railway, while so many other sites were partially destroyed for building material.

The name, which may be interpreted as La Table des Martyres and consequently translated as "The Witnesses' Table", probably derives from this known custom of signing important documents at the slab.

=== Le Pinacle ===
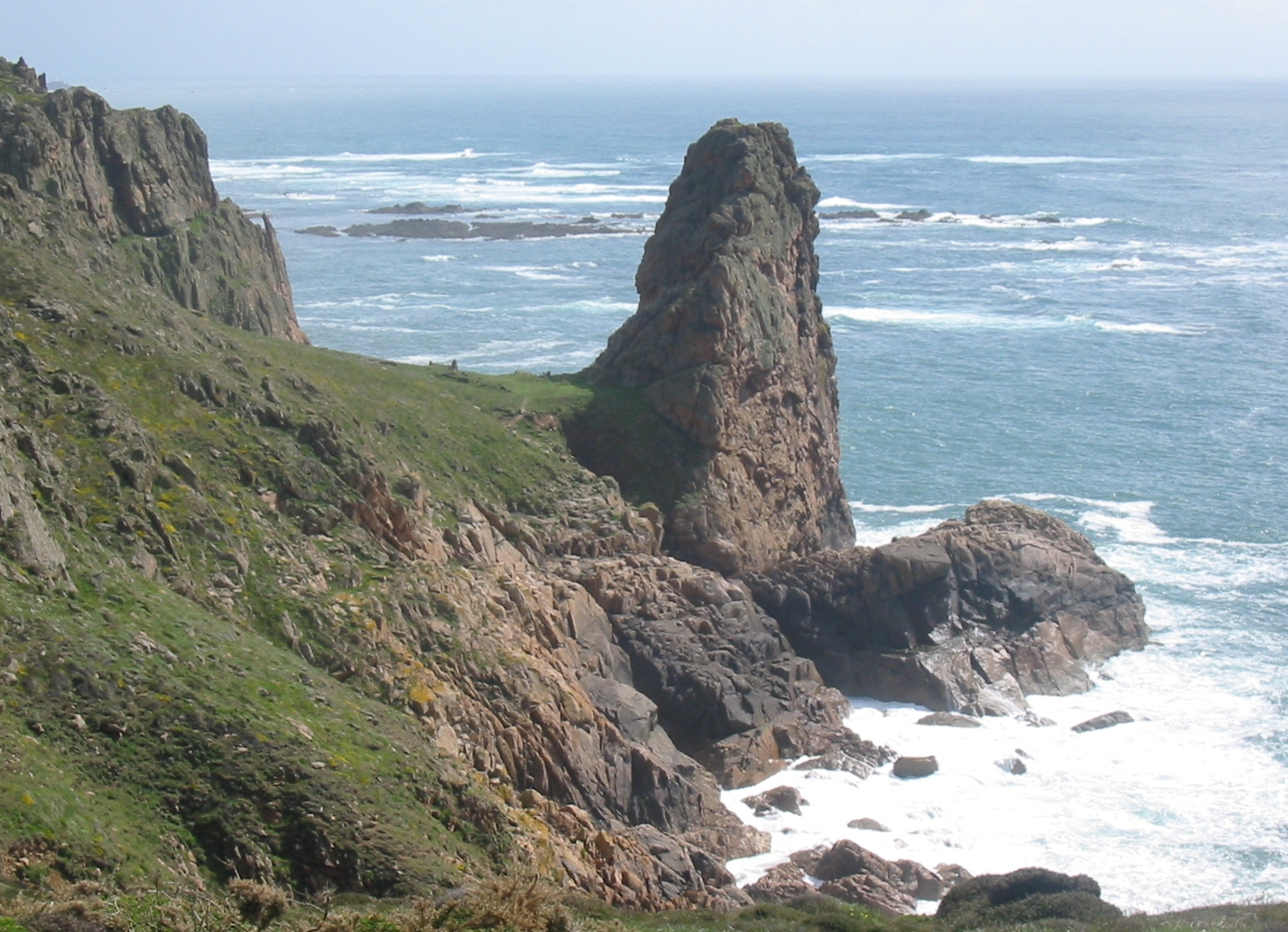
Le Pinacle

Le Pinacle is a natural rock formation that resembles a gigantic menhir. The site itself is positioned below the imposing Le Pinacle, which is on the west of Le Chemin des Landes. The path down to the site is treacherous, and in recent times has seen two tragic deaths. It is inadvisable to go down unless with properly qualified climbers.

There are two earth and rubble ramparts that archaeologists have attributed to the Neolithic/Chalcolithic periods and a third that they have attributed to the Bronze Age. Six pieces of iron found at the site have been attributed to Iron Age occupation. In Roman times the site held a rectangular Gallo-Roman temple. Amongst the large number of finds from various excavations are flints, hammers, rubbers, polishing stones, a copper arrow head, bronze spear head, wheel turned pottery and a Roman coin.

Mark Patton comments: “Recent research has demonstrated the existence of an axe production centre at Le Pinacle, Jersey, and ‘Type P’ dolerite axes produced at Le Pinacle have been identified in assemblages from Guernsey, Sark and Alderney as well as Jersey. Axes of Type P dolerite, however, seem not to be found on the Armorican mainland. “

=== La Hougue Boëte ===
This is a high oval mound in the Parish of St John. Here a four sided Neolithic chamber was found when tunnelled into by excavators in 1911. The cist was found to contain an unusual burial, that of a man lying on top of a horse. Other reported finds included a round bottomed vessel and fragment of a greenstone axe. The horse bones were carbon dated to the Celtic period. It seems likely that the site was built in Neolithic times then re-used in Celtic times for a chieftain’s burial.

This is the only known megalithic cist with a round mound of its type in the Channel Islands and may be culturally linked to early Neolithic cists in south Brittany. The site is also of interest as the location of a seigniorial court.

The Duke of Normandy granted lands here in Jersey to his favoured subjects. They became Seigneur of a fief, often living in a manor house, centrally placed in the area. Anyone living in a fief became a 'tenant' paying rent to the church (usually a tenth of their grain crops) and working for an agreed number of days on the Seigneur's land. The system worked well because tenants had the use of the Seigneurial mill, saving them many hours of work, and disputes between tenants were settled by the Seigneurial court. Incidentally, the Seigneur did not preside over the court most of the time, but left it to deputies, or “prévôts”.

Originally every Seigneurial Court had its Prévôt. appointed annually on some Fiefs by the Seigneur, on others by the Tenants, "to guard the rights of the Seigneur and the tenants, to make good all summonses and loyal records, and to pay the corn-rentes, fermes, and extracts". He had to enforce all orders of the Court and all bye-laws of the Fief.

=== Mont Ubé ===
This is a Neolithic passage grave in Parish of St Clement.

When it was discovered it 1848, the capstones were blasted and removed by quarrymen for building materials. Inside were found human bones, urns, axes and a polished stone pendant. The local farmer who was responsible for the blasting then used the remaining upright stones as a pigsty until it was reclaimed as a historic site.

=== Le Couperon ===
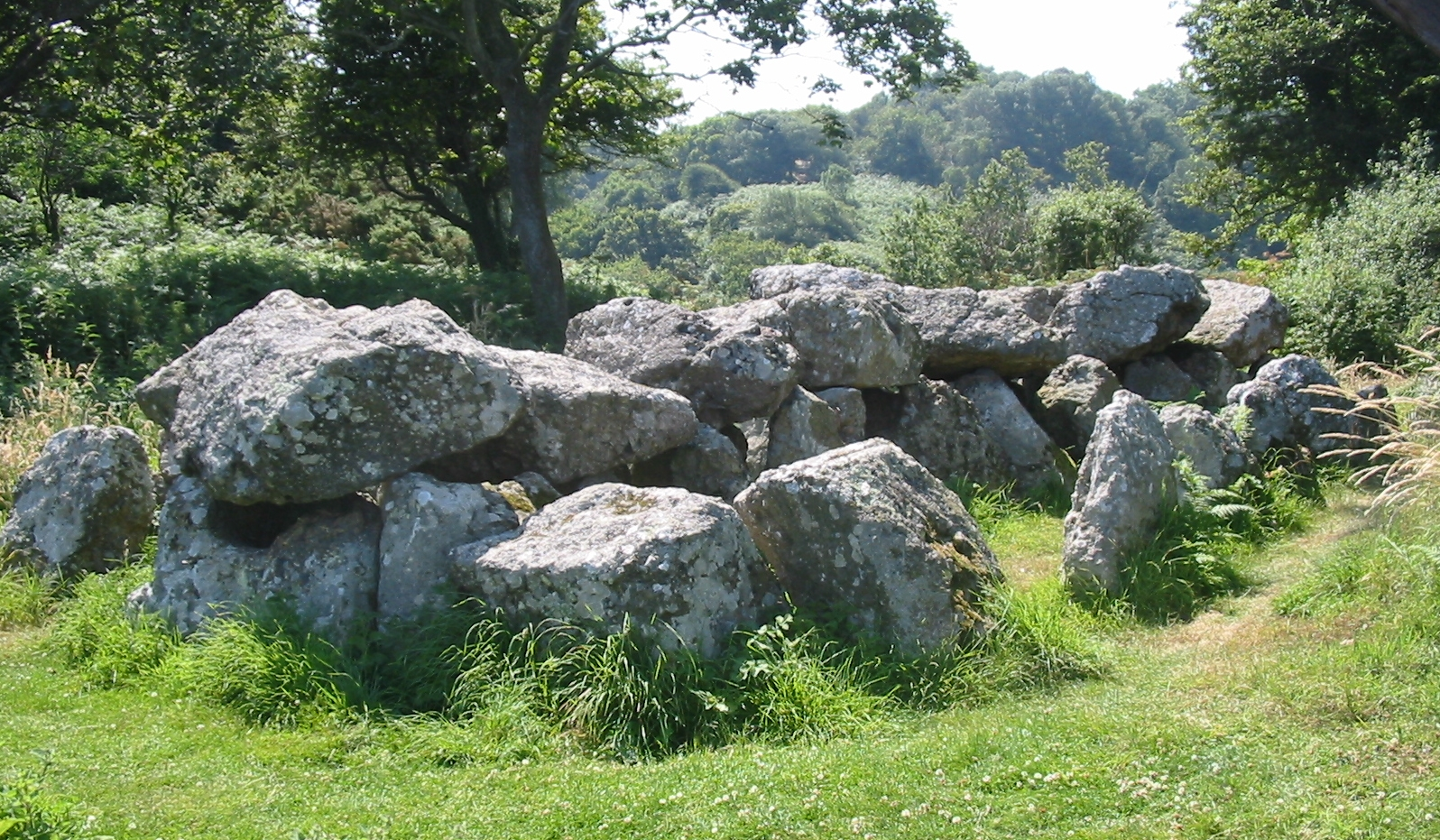
Le Couperon

This is a gallery grave in the Parish of St Martin. Le Couperon is about an eight-meters long capstoned chamber that a long mound had originally covered. It was surrounded by a ring of eighteen outer stones, known as peristaliths. It was well-known at least as early as 1748 as Daniel Defoe mentions it in his tour guide to Great Britain.

The site was first excavated in 1868. By that time the capstones had fallen into the chamber. The excavators lifted these and a porthole stone, and restored the dolmen to what the excavators believed was its original form. Unfortunately, a farmer digging up the mound had scattered the peristaliths. In 1919, the Société Jersiaise moved the porthole stone to its current position at the eastern end of the chamber. However, archeologists believe that originally porthole stone may have stood within the chamber, dividing it into two segments of unequal length, each with its own entrance. Finds at the site included a few flint flakes and pottery fragments.

The dolmen stands within a few metres of the Le Couperon guardhouse, which was built in 1689, and which for more than a century off-and-on housed the garrison of a nearby battery.

== Archaeological ages table ==
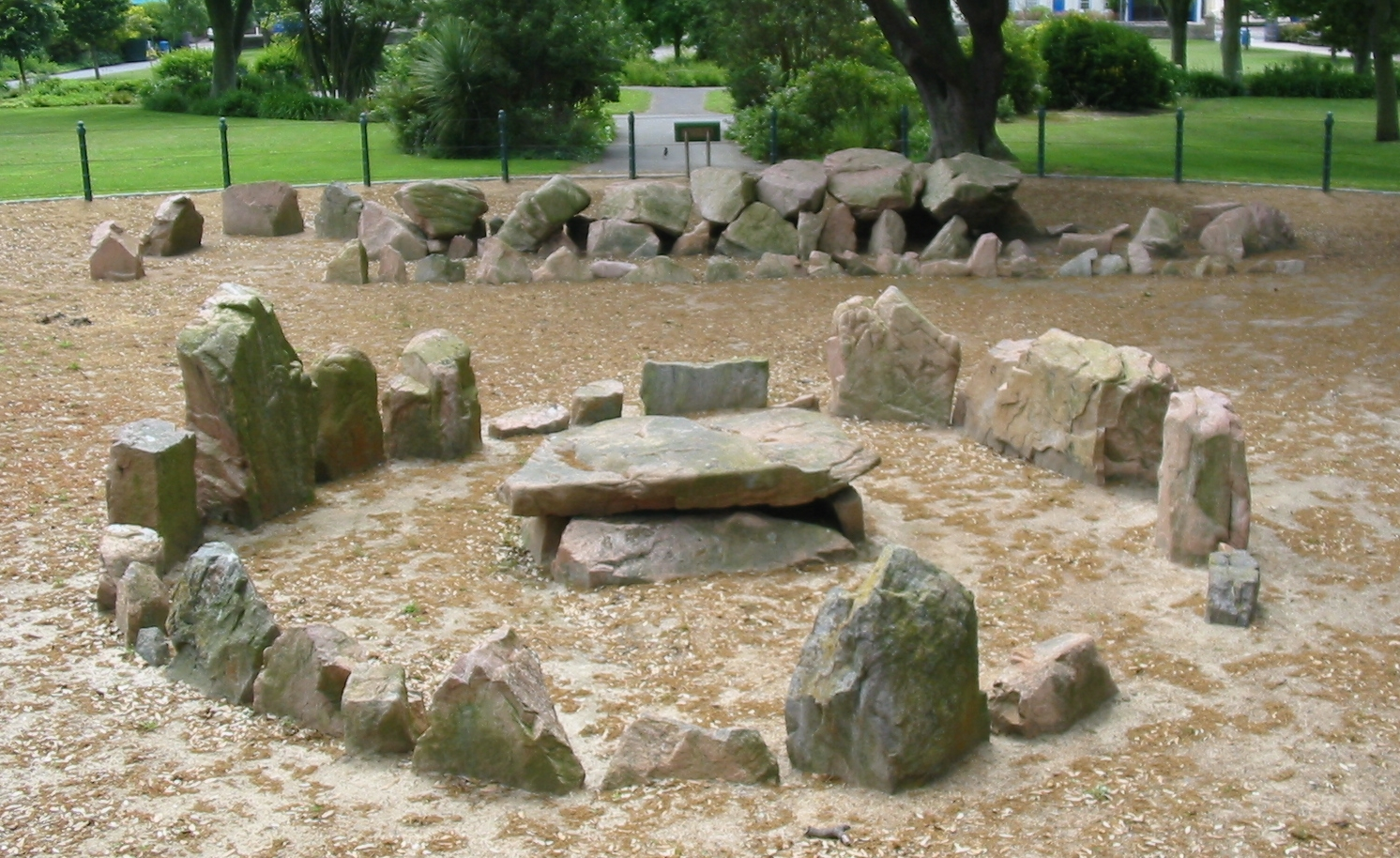
The two dolmens of La Ville ès Nouaux

La Sergenté	4500 BC, Early Neolithic
Le Pinacle	4500- Early Neolithic to Roman
La Hougue Bie, Passage Grave	4000-3200 BC, Neolithic
Mont Ubé, Passage Grave	4000-3200 BC, Neolithic
Mont Grantez, Passage Grave	4000-3200 BC, Neolithic
Faldouet, Passage Grave	4000-3200 BC, Neolithic
Le Couperon, Gallery Grave	3000 BC, Late Neolithic
Ville ès Nouaux, Gallery Grave	3250-2850 BC, Late Neolithic
Menhirs	3000-1500 BC, Late Neolithic
Ville ès Nouaux, Cist in Circle	2800-2000 BC, Late Neolithic

== Beaker People or Culture? ==
When Jacquetta Hawkes wrote The Archaeology of the Channel Islands, she mentioned "the Beaker people" who spread across Europe, possibly from the Iberian Peninsula. They were defined by a distinctive pottery style - a beaker with a distinctive bell-shaped profile - that spread across the Western continent around 2000 B.C. Burial customs of the Beaker people included placing their dead in round barrows, often with a beaker, perhaps to hold a drink for the dead on their final journey. Evidence of such beakers and artefacts have been found in Jersey at Ville ès Nouaux.

The existence of the migratory "Beaker people" is still very much the popular position. Richard R. Doornek, writing on Stonehenge in "School Arts" magazine in 1989, mentions that about 2100 BC "the Beaker people", named after their highly sophisticated pottery, arrived in Britain from the Continent through the Low Countries. Geoffrey Humphrys also wrote on Stonehenge in "Contemporary Review" magazine (1994), and summarizes "about 2100 BC, the Beaker people are reckoned to have started erecting two circles of bluestones".

But many historians and archaeologists now believe that the Beaker people did not exist as a group; as Mark Patton explains, the beakers and related artefacts that are attributed to the Beaker people may well indicate the migration of a "beaker culture" rather than a "beaker people". This is succinctly summed up by Ronald Hutton:

"One of the major developments in British archaeology during the past twenty years has been the loss of confidence by its practitioners in their ability to recognise the movement of peoples. The problem is that an existing population can adopt foreign artefacts and fashions so completely as to appear to have been replaced by foreigners. Thus, according to traditional archaeological practice, had modern Britain been an illiterate society then it would have been natural to have spoken of the invasion of the 'Washing Machine People' in the 1950s and large-scale Japanese immigration in the 1970s."

The recent discovery of the burial of the "Amesbury Archer" in Wiltshire, however, has brought the idea of a "Beaker people" to the fore again. This individual was clearly a high-status male, buried with copper tools, gold jewellery, and beakers. Oxygen isotope analysis on his teeth indicates that he grew up in central Europe, possibly Switzerland or Austria. Immigration clearly happened, but not necessarily on a large scale: the arrival of a small number of immigrants, bringing with them new technologies, skills and ideas, may have provoked a profound change in the nature of society.

== Philately ==
In 2012, Jersey Post issued a five-stamp set of stamps, designed by Andrew Robinson, each of which featured one of five dolmens: Mont Ubé, Le Couperon, Ville-és-Nouaux, Les Monts Grantez and La Pouquelaye de Faldouet.

== Bibliography ==
- Defoe, Daniel (1748) A Tour Through the Whole Island of Great Britain: Divided Into Circuits Or Journeys. (S. Birt, T. Osborne).
- The Archaeology of the Channel Islands. Vol. 2: The Bailiwick of Jersey by Jacquetta Hawkes (1939)
- The Prehistoric Foundations of Europe to the Mycenean Age, 1940, C. F. C. Hawkes
- Jersey in Prehistory, Mark Patton, 1987
- The Archaeology and Early History of the Channel Islands, Heather Sebire, 2005.
- Dolmens of Jersey: A Guide, James Hibbs (1988).
- A Guide to The Dolmens of Jersey, Peter Hunt, Société Jersiaise, 1998.
- Statements in Stone: Monuments and Society in Neolithic Brittany, Mark Patton, 1993
- Hougue Bie, Mark Patton, Warwick Rodwell, Olga Finch, 1999
- The Channel Islands, An Archaeological Guide, David Johnston, 1981
- The Archaeology of the Channel Islands, Peter Johnston, 1986
- The Pagan Religions of the Ancient British Isles; Their Nature and Legacy by Ronald Hutton, 1991.
- The Ancient World of the Celts, Peter Beresford Ellis, 1998
- ‘Pouques and the Faiteaux: Channel Islands’, Young, S. and Houlbrook, C. (eds.) Magical Folk: British and Irish Fairies 500 AD to the Present (London, 2017), pp. 151-164.
