= Boscombe Bowmen =

Remains of five early Bronze Age men and four children, found near Stonehenge

The Boscombe Bowmen is the name given by archaeologists to a group of early Bronze Age (Bell Beaker) people found in a shared burial at Boscombe Down in Amesbury (grid reference SU16384105) near Stonehenge in Wiltshire, England.

== Discovery ==
The burials were found in 2003 during roadworks being carried out on behalf of Qinetiq, the contractor that operates the Boscombe Down military airfield. The site is near a group of houses (known as Lower Camp) in Amesbury which are associated with the airfield (which lies to the east).

== The burials ==
The grave contained the remains of at least nine individuals including several juveniles, five adult males and the cremated remains of an infant. Analysis of the skulls suggests that the men and the teenager were related to each other. The eldest man was buried in a crouched position with the bones of the others scattered around him, and their skulls resting at his feet. They became known as the Bowmen because several flint arrowheads were placed in the grave. Other grave goods included a boar's tusk, a bone toggle, flint tools, and eight Beaker vessels; an unusually high number.

The burials are thought to date from around 2500 - 2200 BCE, making them broadly contemporary with the Amesbury Archer who had been found the year before about half a kilometre to the south. The broad date range is an artefact of the ranges of radiocarbon dates for different remains and archaeologists believe the grave was in use over a much shorter timescale of 25–50 years.

== Analysis ==
Lead isotope analysis of the men's teeth has indicated that they grew up in the areas either of modern Wales or in the Lake District, but left in childhood. This was at first thought to be contemporary with the major building work of erecting the sarsen circle and the trilithons at Stonehenge but research published in 2007 indicates that these burials occurred shortly after Stonehenge Phase 3ii.

== Display ==
The finds are on display at the Wessex Gallery of Archaeology, which opened at the Salisbury Museum in 2014.

== In popular culture ==
The bowmen feature as characters in Mark Patton's novel Undreamed Shores, and part of the storyline is based on the circumstances of their burial.

== See also ==
- Amesbury Archer
- Stonehenge Archer
