= Adrian Greene =

Adrian Greene may refer to:

- Adrian Lawrence Greene (1848–1907), justice of the Kansas Supreme Court
- Adrian Greene (Canadian football) (born 1999), Canadian football defensive back

== See also ==
- Adrian Green, museum curator
