= Stonehenge Archer =

Human remains discovered in Stonehenge, England

Coordinates: 51.0645°N 1.8001°W

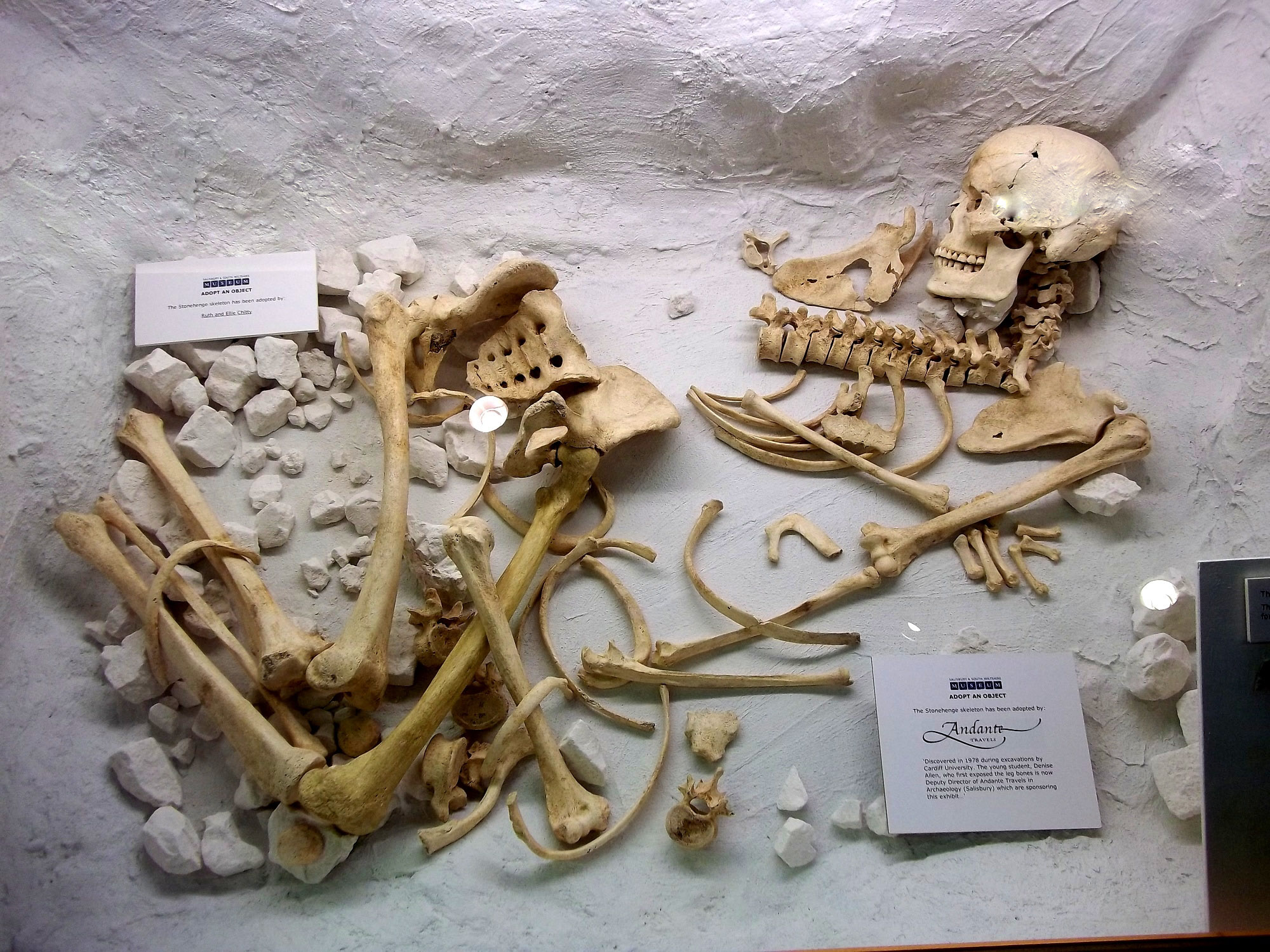
- Displayed in the Salisbury and South Wiltshire Museum
- Born: c. 2330 BC
- Died: c. 2300 BC (aged c. 30); Stonehenge
- Body discovered: May 1978
- Resting place: Salisbury, England, United Kingdom

The Stonehenge Archer (c. 2330 BC - c. 2300 BC) is the name given to a Bronze Age man whose body was discovered in the outer ditch of Stonehenge. Unlike most burials in the Stonehenge Landscape, his body was not in a barrow, although it did appear to have been deliberately and carefully buried in the ditch.

Examination of the skeleton indicated that the man was local to the area and aged around 30 when he died. Radiocarbon dating suggests that he died around 2300 BCE, making his death roughly contemporary with the Amesbury Archer and the Boscombe Bowmen buried 3 miles away in Amesbury.

He came to be known as an archer because of the stone wrist-guard and a number of flint arrowheads buried with him. In fact, several of the arrowheads' tips were located in the skeleton's bones, suggesting that the man had been killed by them.

His body was excavated in 1978 by Richard Atkinson and John G. Evans who had been re-examining an older trench in the ditch and bank of Stonehenge. His remains are now housed in the Salisbury Museum in Salisbury.

== See also ==
- Boscombe Bowmen
- Amesbury Archer

== Bibliography ==
- Chippendale, C, Stonehenge Complete (Thames and Hudson, London, 2004) ISBN 0-500-28467-9
- English Heritage Guidebooks: "Stonehenge" (English Heritage 2005) ISBN 1-85074-933-7
