= Thomas Staveley =

English antiquarian and anti-Papist

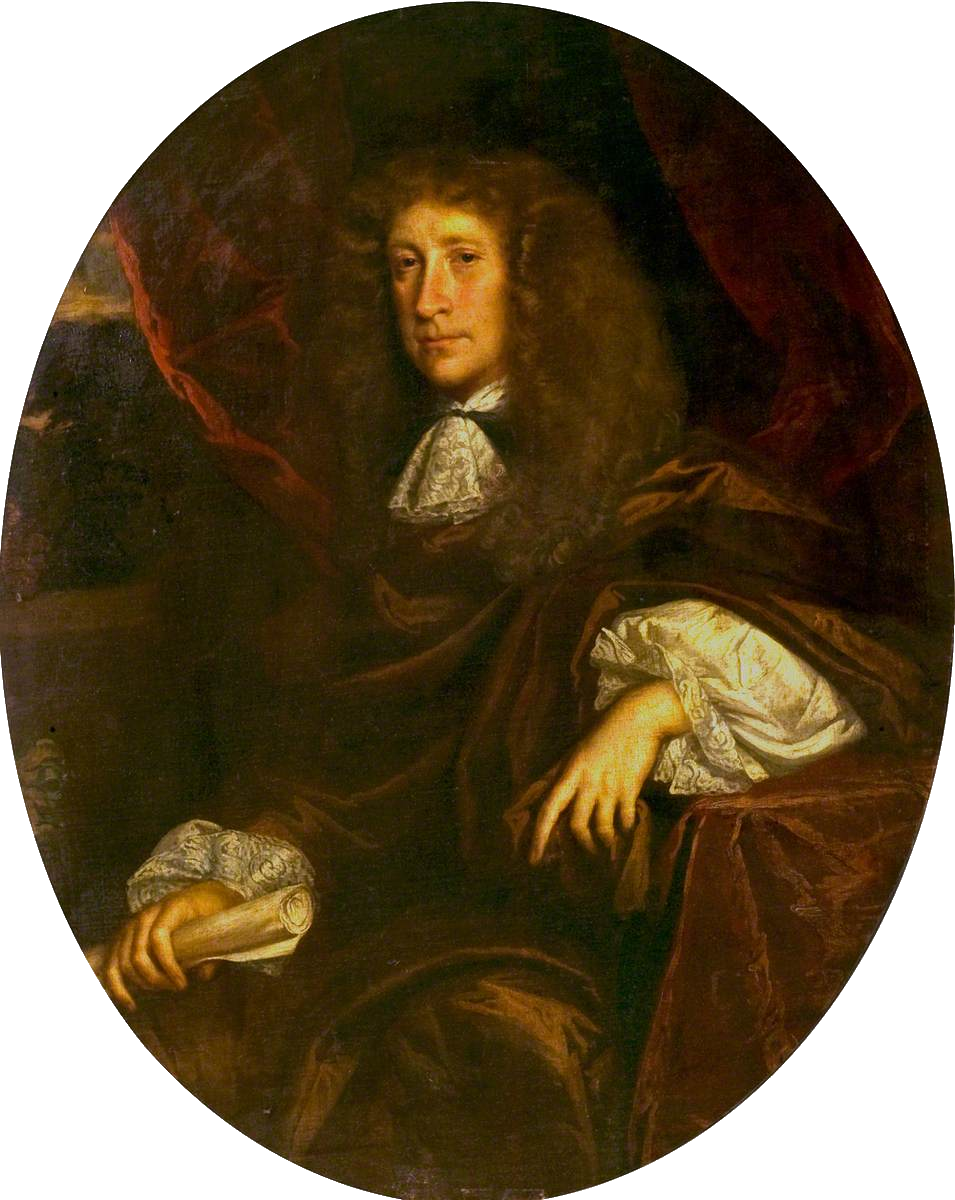
- Portrait of Thomas Staveley, 17th century (Leicester: New Walk Museum)
- Born: East Langton, Leicestershire, England
- Baptised: 26 November 1626
- Died: 2 January 1684 (aged 57); Leicester, Leicestershire, England

Thomas Staveley (bapt. 26 November 1626 – 2 January 1684) was a Stuart antiquary, magistrate, anti-Papist, and Church historian. He spent most of his life researching the antiquities of his home county, Leicestershire.

Born in East Langton, Staveley attended Cambridge University from 1644 to 1654. Here he studied law, that being the profession he would later take on, serving as a Lancashire Justice of the peace. He was described by contemporaries as a just and even-tempered magistrate, but was most renowned for his manuscripts of Leicestershire history, which were instrumental in the later histories of John Nichols. Staveley published only one work in his lifetime, The Romish Horseleech (1674), a political tract protesting James II's Catholicism, later held up as a "no-Popery classic". Staveley died on 8 January 1684 in Friar Lane. Posthumously, two lesser-known historical treatises of Staveley were published, on the English monarchy and Church history, respectively.

== Early life and education ==
Thomas Staveley was born to William Staveley (1596–1652), rector of Cossington, Leicestershire, and Anne (1605–1680), daughter of Thomas Babington of Rothley. He was born in East Langton, Leicestershire, sometime in November 1626, and was baptised on 26 November, in the parish church, Church Langton. He was brought up as the eldest of twelve siblings and was admitted to Emmanuel College, at Cambridge University, on 14 April 1644. Here he was admitted to the Inner Temple on 2 July 1647, and called to the bar on 12 June 1654.

== Legal career, antiquarianism and works ==
Professionally, Staveley practised law, serving as part of the Leicester Quorum of Justices of the peace, even through the changes of Charles II's reign. In 1662, he succeeded his father-in-law, as steward to Leicester Corporation. Samuel Carte favourably records his jurisprudence, recalling he "was strictly just, abhorring all manner of fraud or bribery in his practice of the law, was very rarely observed to be in a passion".

Staveley's main interest was the antiquarian research of the history of his home county. Much of his research survives in manuscript form (BL, Add. MS 15917; 'History of Leicester', Leics. RO), and was incorporated into John Nichols' histories, The History and Antiquities of the County of Leicester (1795–1811; 8 vols.) and Bibliotheca Topographica Britannica (1780–90; 8 vols.). John Nichols duly commemorated him, in his Leicestershire history, as "a diligent, judicious, and faithful Antiquary". This research was also used in the posthumous publication of Staveley's The History of Churches in England (1712), a work published at a time of little interest in architectural history, and regarded by Adrian Green as one of the earliest antiquarians to realise buildings could be dated "from the Observation and View of the Fabrick it self" (as Staveley put it). Staveley's other historical work was Three Historical Essays (1703), posthumously published by his youngest son, George. The short treatise concerned (1) proving English claims to the French throne, while annulling Salic law; (2) the competition between the Houses of Lancaster and Plantagenet, alongside the Wars of the Roses; and (3) the successive unifications of Britain under Henry VII, James VI and I, and Charles II.

Despite these interests, during his lifetime, Staveley's only published work was a religious tract: The Romish Horseleech: or an Impartial Account of the Intolerable Charge of Popery to this Nation (1674), the work "for which he is best known" according to the DNB, which protested the recent Catholic conversion of the heir presumptive, James II, the controversial Royal Declaration of Indulgence (1672), and the opposition to the Test Act (1673). The book was published anonymously, its incendiary title added by another author, and Staveley's short "Essay of the Supremacy of the King of England" appended to it. In 1768, the anti-Catholic Whig, Thomas Hollis, reprinted The Romish Horseleech as a "no-Popery classic", in order to fan the flames of his cause. He made sure the book would receive flattering reviews in the literary magazine, The Monthly Review, in order to have the maximum impact on the public. The assured review referred to the book as "calculated to excite, in the minds of men, a just abhorrence of the tyrannical usurpations and gross impositions of that church". The book was one of only two books Thomas Jefferson owned on the subject of Catholicism.

== Personal life ==
In 1656, Thomas Staveley married Mary (d. 1669), the youngest daughter of John Onebye of Hinckley, in Belgrave, Leicester. Thomas and Mary had seven children, three sons: Thomas (d. 1676), William (1662–1723) and George (1665–1709); and four daughters: Mary (d. 1729), Anne (1663–1694), Christiana (b. 1667) and Jane (1669–1705). William became an army captain, and converted to Catholicism, indifferent to his father's anti-Romanist legacy, and George became the rector of Medbourne. Staveley lived in Belgrave for nearly all his adult life, residing in the parsonage there, excluding the six or seven years before his death when he lived in Friar Lane, Leicester. In the later part of his life, he "acquired a melancholy habit", according to Nichols, and suffered from "the greatest pains which very severe fits of the gout exercised him", according to Carte.

Staveley's wife, Mary, died in Belgrave, and was buried in St Peter's Church on the 12 October 1669. On 2 January 1684, Staveley died at his house in Friar Lane, buried soon after in the Church of St Mary de Castro on 8 January 1684. This burial was well attended, with the twenty-four aldermen and lord mayor of Leicester present for the solemn proceedings. In his will, Staveley left his house and lands in Leicester, a cottage and lands in Ilston on the Hill, and several smaller bequests of £400.

== Sources ==
- Fletcher, William George Dimock (1898). "Staveley, Thomas" . In Lee, Sidney (ed.). Dictionary of National Biography. Vol. 54. London: Smith, Elder & Co.
- Jenkins, Robin P. (2004). "Staveley, Thomas". Oxford Dictionary of National Biography (online ed.). Oxford University Press. doi:10.1093/ref:odnb/26329. (Subscription or UK public library membership required.)
- Nichols, John (1971) [1798]. The History and Antiquities of the County of Leicester, Vol. 2, Pt. 2 (Reprint ed.). Leicester: S. R. Publisher Ltd.
