= East Langton =

Village in Leicestershire, England

Coordinates: 52.527°N 0.930°W

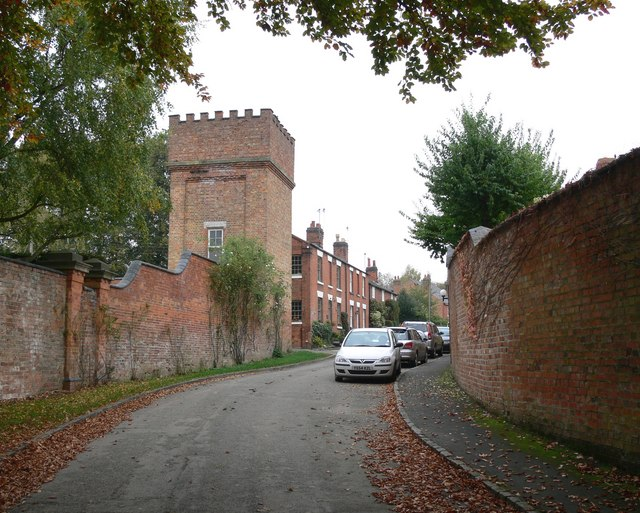
- The large castellated water tower belongs to East Langton Grange.

- Location within Leicestershire
- Population: 393 (2011)
- Civil parish: East Langton
- District: Harborough
- Shire county: Leicestershire
- Region: East Midlands
- Country: England
- Sovereign state: United Kingdom
- Post town: MARKET HARBOROUGH
- Postcode district: LE16
- Dialling code: 01858
- Police: Leicestershire
- Fire: Leicestershire
- Ambulance: East Midlands
- UK Parliament: Harborough, Oadby and Wigston

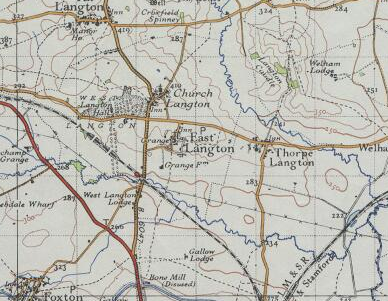
Map showing East Langton and its surrounding area

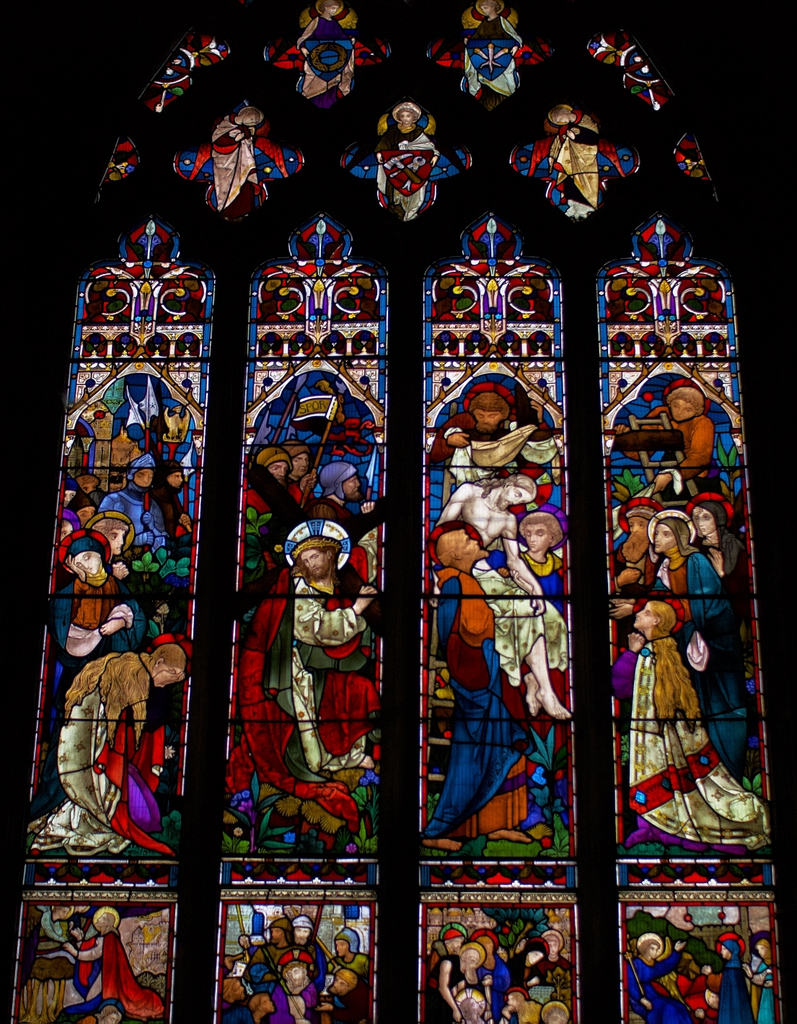
Church Langton St Peter church stained glass by Heaton, Butler and Bayne

East Langton (derived from the Anglo-Saxon word for an enclosure, meaning "long town") is a village and civil parish in the Harborough district of Leicestershire, England.

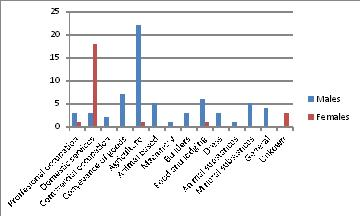
Male and Female Occupations of East Langton Civil Parish, Leicestershire as reported by the Census of Population in 1881

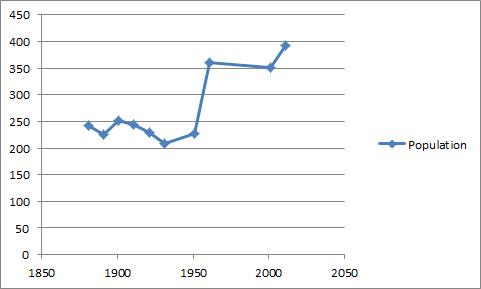
Total Population of East Langton Civil Parish, Leicestershire as reported by the Census of Population from 1881 to 2011

The parish also includes Church Langton. It is near Kibworth and Market Harborough, and the parish according to the 2011 census had a population of 393. Church Langton church tower is a landmark to travellers from the south, and the whole building is finely proportioned. The church has an organ given by William Hanbury, vicar for 25 years from 1753. There is an Old Roman Road that runs nearby, as it moves southeast out of Leicester. It is about 86 miles north of London, 12 miles south-east of Leicester city and 4 miles north of Market Harborough. Overall, the parish covers 1,055 acres of land and includes all of the township of East Langton. Its nearest arterial road is the B6047, with the village lying just to the east.

Historically, the parish land was largely used for animal grazing. East Langton parish church was built in the year 1615 but was later restored in 1866 in order to increase its seating capacity of 287. The place was an ancient township in Leicester county and became a modern Civil Parish in December, 1866, when it was split off from Church Langton. On 25 March 1885, this parish was reduced in size when the "Vendy's Lodge" area was transferred to Thorpe Langton Civil Parish. On 25 March 1885, this parish gained in size when portions of Thorpe Langton Civil Parish and West Langton Civil Parish were transferred to it. In 1925 this parish was further increased in size, when it gained about 63 acres of land when the Civil Parish borders in the area were "adjusted".

Most of the houses in the village appear to have been built or rebuilt in brick during the 19th and early 20th centuries but a few older buildings survive. The Bell Inn, is an ironstone building of three bays, the north bay of which has been rebuilt in brick; the older part dates from the late 17th century. Its northern end was formerly the village smithy, now mainly used for work on agricultural machinery. On the opposite side of the road a re-roofed cottage with a symmetrical front and a pedimented door case is dated 1724 with initials JBC. A council housing estate was built on the east side of the road, after the Second World War which housed 50 people when completed. East Langton now contains a total of 103 houses.

In the 1880s, East Langton was described as

township and vil. (ry. sta. Langton) Church Langton par., Leicestershire, 3½ miles N. of Market Harborough, pop. 242

As of the 2011 census, there is a slightly higher ratio of women to men and 60.8% of people are considered to have very good health compared to the national average of 47.2%. A low proportion of people are unemployed at 2.4%. 96.2% of people living in the village are white, English and 69.5% are Christian, the majority of the rest being unreligious. The mean age of people in the village in 41, slightly higher than the national average. Only 1.3% of people have the highest level of qualification, which is relatively low but only 16% have no qualifications at all, a low number. According to reports from the 1901 census, the parish only covered 992 acres of land and had a population of 244, showing the expansion is size and number of people in the following 100 years.

The village had a train station, named "East Langton station", opened in 1876 that operated on Midland Railway until its closure in 1968. The nearest school is Church Langton C of E Primary School, which is based 0.4 miles away, with 17 school children coming from the village.

Notable residents: Thomas Staveley, a well-known antiquary, born in the village in 1626.
