= Salisbury cutlery industry =

The Salisbury cutlery industry was active in the city of Salisbury, England from late Medieval times until the start of the 20th century. While production was not on the scale of the Sheffield cutlery industry, the Salisbury cutlers were noted for the quality of their products. A reason given for success of the industry was the fineness of the steel produced, resulting from the quality of the local water, which came from the surrounding chalk downland. The Salisbury Museum has a collection of Salisbury-made cutlery and a scrapbook of trade-cards that were collected by the Salisbury cutlers, James and Thomas Goddard, who were cutlers to George III.

== References to the industry ==
Poets sang the praise of the industry. John Gay (1685–1735) in an epistle to Lord Burlington extolls Salisbury:

Who can forsake thy walls and not admire
The proud Cathedral and the lofty spire?
What semptress has not proved thy scissors good?

A couplet from the Bath Guide c.1820 runs:

Let Bristol for commerce and dirt be renowned
At Salisbury let penknives and scissors be ground

While a traditional saying attributes Salisbury’s fame to:

The height of its steeple,
The pride of its people
Its scissors and knives
And diligent wives

The earliest reference to a cutler working in Salisbury was in c1270-80 when "Sebode the Cutiller, held a tenement in Brown Street."

John Aubrey wrote that Salisbury was 'ever-famous' for the manufacture of razors, scissors, and knives. Late 18th-century directories list six cutlers in Salisbury, and in 1790 it was said that the city was noted for the manufacture of scissors. The trade continued throughout the 19th century. George III and the Duchess of Kent are said to have patronised members of the Botly family, cutlers of the Market Place. It was the custom to meet the London and Exeter coach and display cutlery to the passengers.

James Macklin, a working cutler who was Mayor of Salisbury at the outbreak of the First World War, was knighted for his work for the war effort.

== Sources ==
- Crittall, Elizabeth, ed. (1962). "Victoria County History: Wiltshire: Vol 6 – Salisbury: Economic history since 1612". British History Online. University of London.
- Haskins C. (1912) Ancient Trade Guilds and Companies of Salisbury.
- Moore C.N. (undated but ?1971) The Salisbury Cutlery Industry, Wiltshire Industrial Archaeology, the magazine of the Salisbury and South Wilts Industrial Archaeology Society, No4, pp.7-14.
