= Bracer =

Protection for an archer's bow-arm

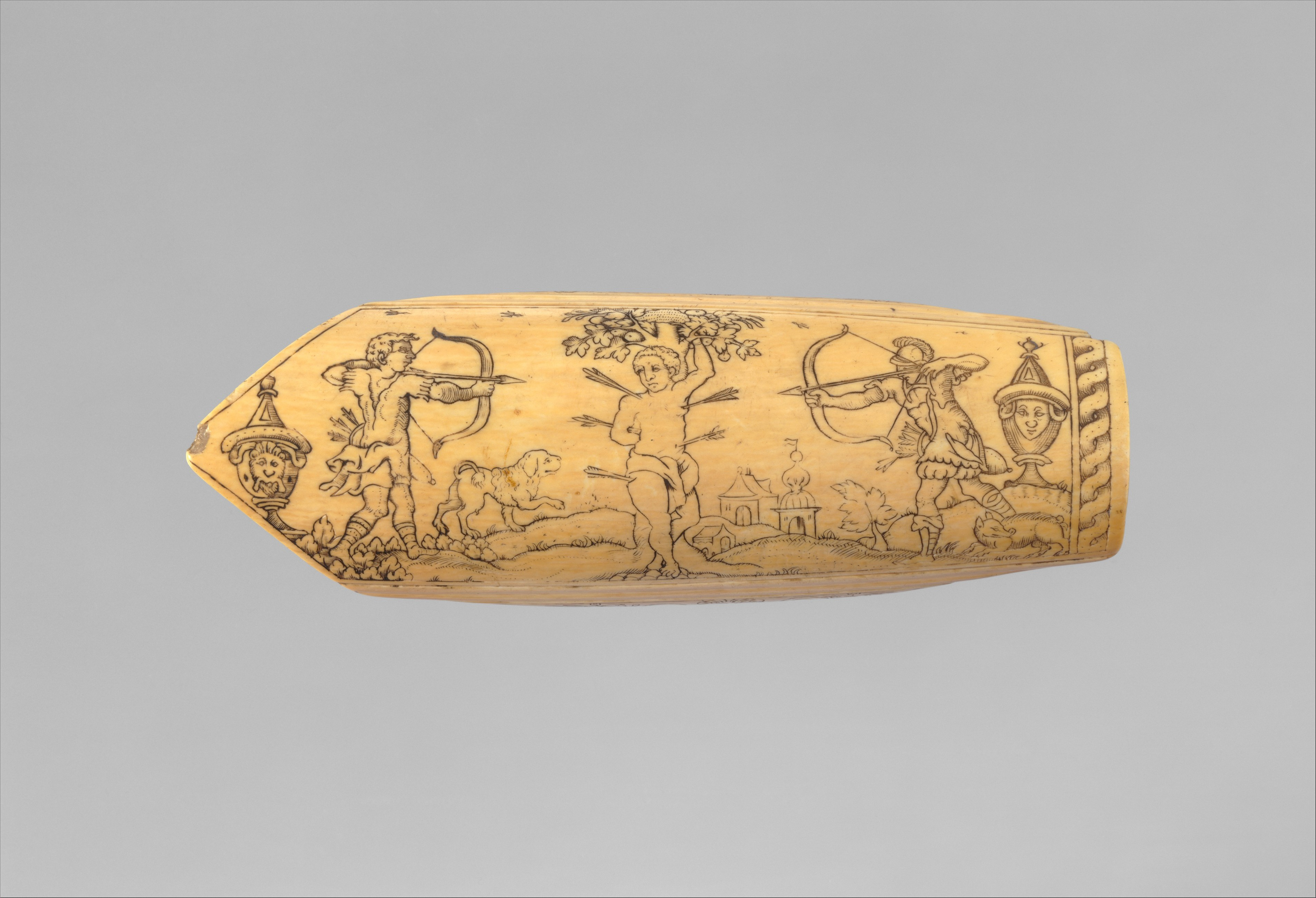
A Dutch bracer from the late 16th century, made of ivory and intricately decorated

A bracer (or arm-guard) is a strap or sheath, commonly made of leather, stone or plastic, that covers the ventral (inside) surface of an archer's bow-holding arm. It protects the archer's forearm against injury by accidental whipping from the bowstring or the fletching of the arrow while shooting, and also prevents the loose sleeve from catching the bowstring. They normally only cover part of the forearm, but full-length bracers extending to the upper arm are also available, and other areas have been covered by some archers. In addition, chest guards are sometimes worn, usually by female archers, to protect the breast. With some combinations of non-baggy clothing and bows with a larger distance between the bow and the string, the archer may not need to wear any bracer.

== Decorated bracers ==
The modern Navajo people and Hopi developed a form of bracer known as a ketoh, which can be decorated with silver, turquoise, and other adornments, possibly from earlier examples made of bone. Ketohs usually have a central motif, sometimes with a stone ornament, and four curvilinear shapes that radiate toward the corners. Ketohs may have a smooth leather surface on the inside of the arm and are then functional, but they are normally used as items of personal and ritual adornment, or as works of art in their own right.

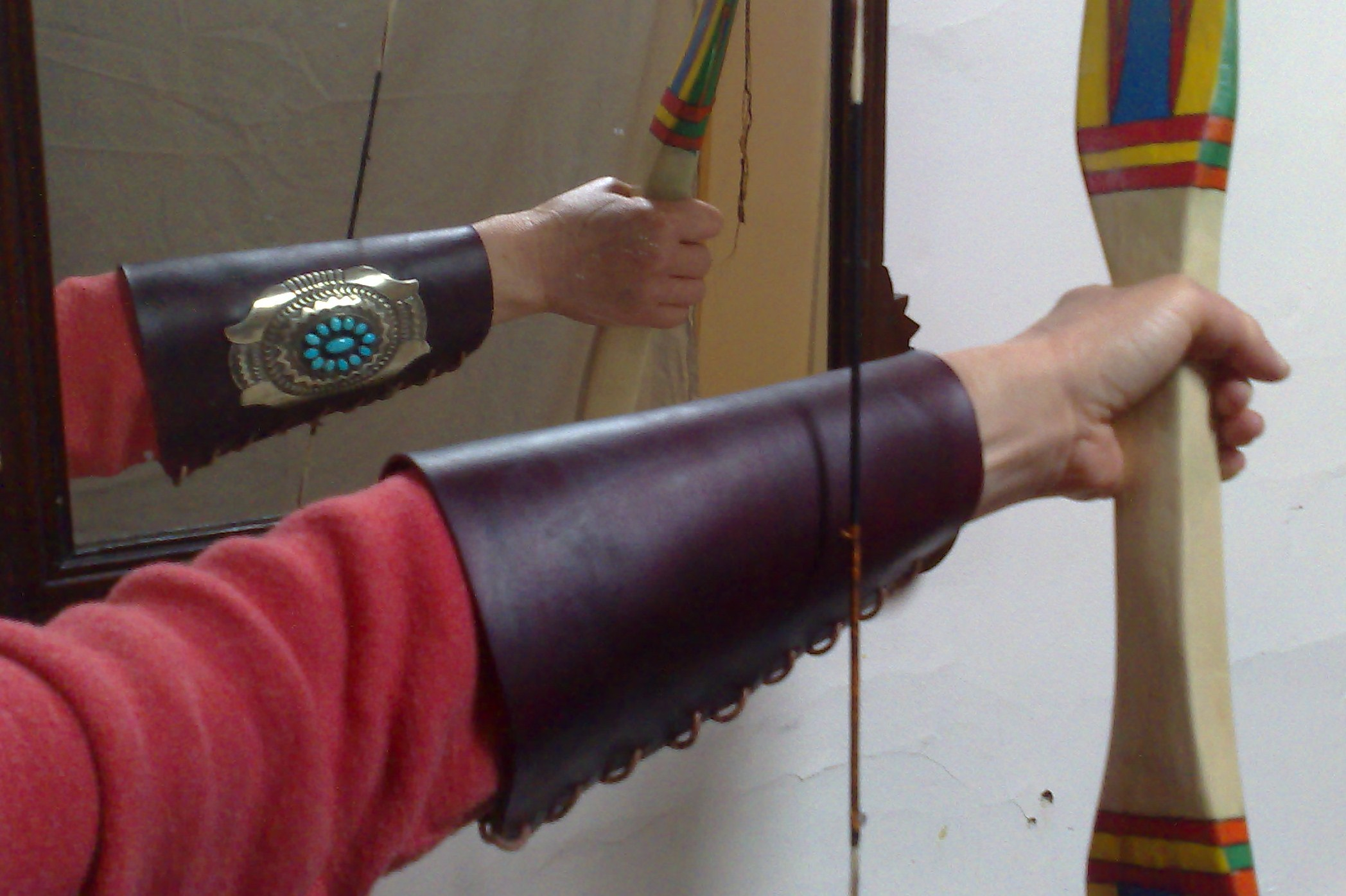
Ketoh armguard, leather embellished with silver and turquoise, with bow

Stone wrist-guards from Beaker culture graves of the European Bronze Age have been thought to be archery bracers. However, they are usually found on the outside of the arm where they would have been more conspicuous. Many have only two holes which would make them difficult to fasten securely to the arm, and some have projecting rivets which would catch on the bow string and make them unsuitable for use as a bracer. Many show great skill in polishing and stone working, and few are found in areas from which their stone originates. When the objects occur in barrows, they always occur in the central primary grave, a place thought to be reserved for heads of family and other important people. They may have been status symbols of prowess in hunting or war, probably mounted as decorations on functional bracers. A few wrist-guards made of gold or amber have also been found; scholars believe these were for ornamental rather than functional use. A review identifies two major sources of stone from which they are made, suggests that they may well not be connected with archery, and highlights other potential uses.

== Other uses ==
Bracers have also been used in other sports, including ball games such as follis (played in ancient Rome).

In many common role-playing games, bracers are a general piece of armour rather than protective archery equipment, possibly due to confusion with vambraces.
