= Richard Fowler (physician) =

English physician

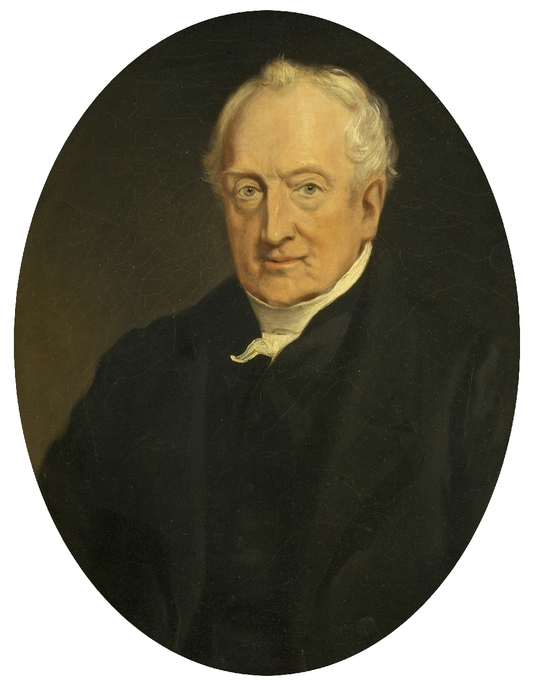
Richard Fowler by Benjamin Brassett Wadham

Richard Fowler (28 November 1765 – 13 April 1863), was an English physician.

== Early life ==
Richard Fowler was born in London, and though he lived to a greater age than any other member of the College of Physicians, Fowler was of feeble health when a child. He was educated at Edinburgh and studied medicine there, and visited Paris as a student. Returning to Edinburgh in 1790 he continued his medical studies, and graduated M.D. on 12 September 1793 with a dissertation 'De Inflammatione.'

== Career and death ==
He was also a member of the celebrated 'Speculative Society,’ to which he contributed essays. He was admitted licentiate of the College of Physicians of London 21 March 1796, and settled in practice at Salisbury, where he passed the remainder of his life. He was at once elected physician to the Salisbury Infirmary, and held the office till 1847. He was elected a Fellow of the Royal Society in 1802, and often took part in the meetings of the British Association, to attend which and to read a paper there he made the journey from Salisbury to Aberdeen in 1859, when close upon ninety-four years of age. He was successful in practice, and occupied a leading position in Salisbury for many years. He died at Milford, near Salisbury, in his ninety-eighth year, an age reached by very few persons in the annals of medicine.

== Interests and works ==
Fowler always kept up an interest in science, without producing any notable original work. While a student in Edinburgh, after his return from Paris, he was fascinated by the recent discoveries of Galvani on the form of electricity called by his name, and made numerous experiments on the subject, which were published in a small volume entitled 'Experiments and Observations on the Influence lately discovered by M. Galvani, and commonly called Animal Electricity,’ 8vo, Edinburgh, 1793. It contains, also, observations on the action of opium on nerves and muscles. Many years after Fowler published two small books on the psychology of persons in whom the senses are defective, viz. 'Observations on the Mental State of the Blind and Deaf and Dumb,’ 12mo, Salisbury, 1843; 2nd edit. 1860; and 'The Physiological Processes of Thinking, especially in Persons whose Organs of Sense are Defective,’ 12mo, Salisbury, 1849; 2nd edit. 1852. These works show some reading, and contain interesting observations, but are wanting in lucidity and in philosophical method. He also wrote 'On Literary and Scientific Pursuits as conducive to Longevity,’ Salisbury, 1855, 12mo. Fowler appears to have written nothing on purely medical subjects, but contributed memoirs to the 'Proceedings of the British Association,’ some of which were published separately.

In 1860 he founded the Salisbury and South Wiltshire Museum in St Ann's Street, Salisbury.
