= Stone wrist-guard =

Type of Early Bronze Age item

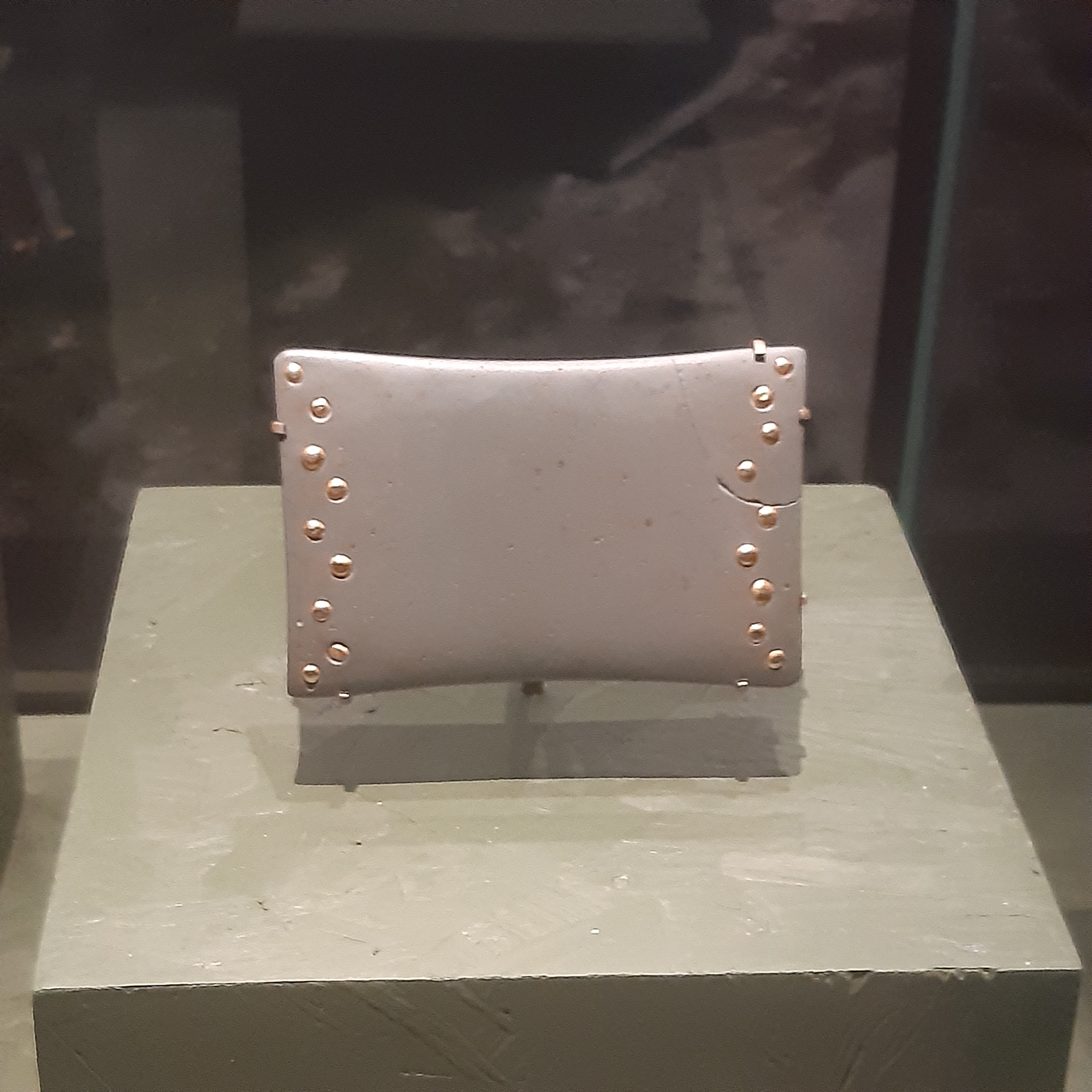
Stone wrist-guard with gold studs from Barnack, in the British Museum

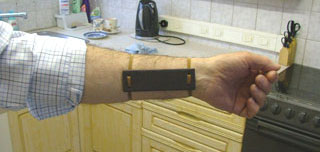
Replica of slate stone wrist-guard as it may have been worn.

Early Bronze Age stone wrist-guards are found across Europe from around 2400–1900 BCE and are closely associated with the Beaker culture and Únětice culture. In the past they have been variously known as stone bracers, stone arm-guards and armlets, although "stone wrist-guard" is currently the favoured terminology; and it is no longer thought that they were functional archer's bracers. Recent experimental archaeology suggests they may have been portable whetstones used to sharpen copper knives.

== Description ==
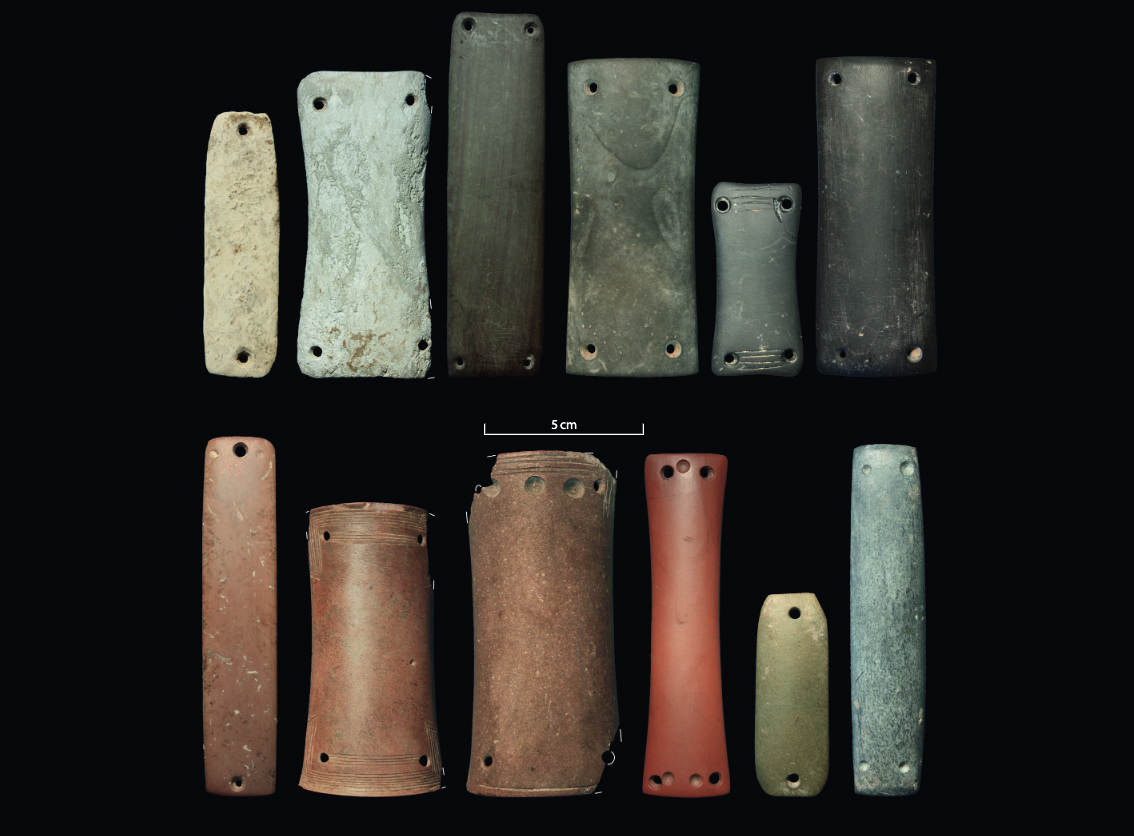
Stone wrist-guards from Central Europe, Bell Beaker culture

The wrist-guards are small rectangles of stone (often slate) with a number of perforations, typically between two and six, which might allow attachment to the arm with cord. One, from Hemp Knoll in Wiltshire, had markings which clearly indicate its attachment to the arm by two cords. The shapes of the wrist-guard are stereotyped, and common forms exhibit a narrowed 'waist' and curved cross-section (presumably so they fit the arm better).

Stone wrist-guards are exclusively found in the graves of males, frequently lying next to the body's wrist. Rare examples—three in Great Britain—use rare imported greenstone and are decorated with gold-capped rivets or foil, clearly representing an elite form. The three British examples are from burials at Driffield and Barnack in England, and Culduthel Mains in Scotland.

== Original use ==
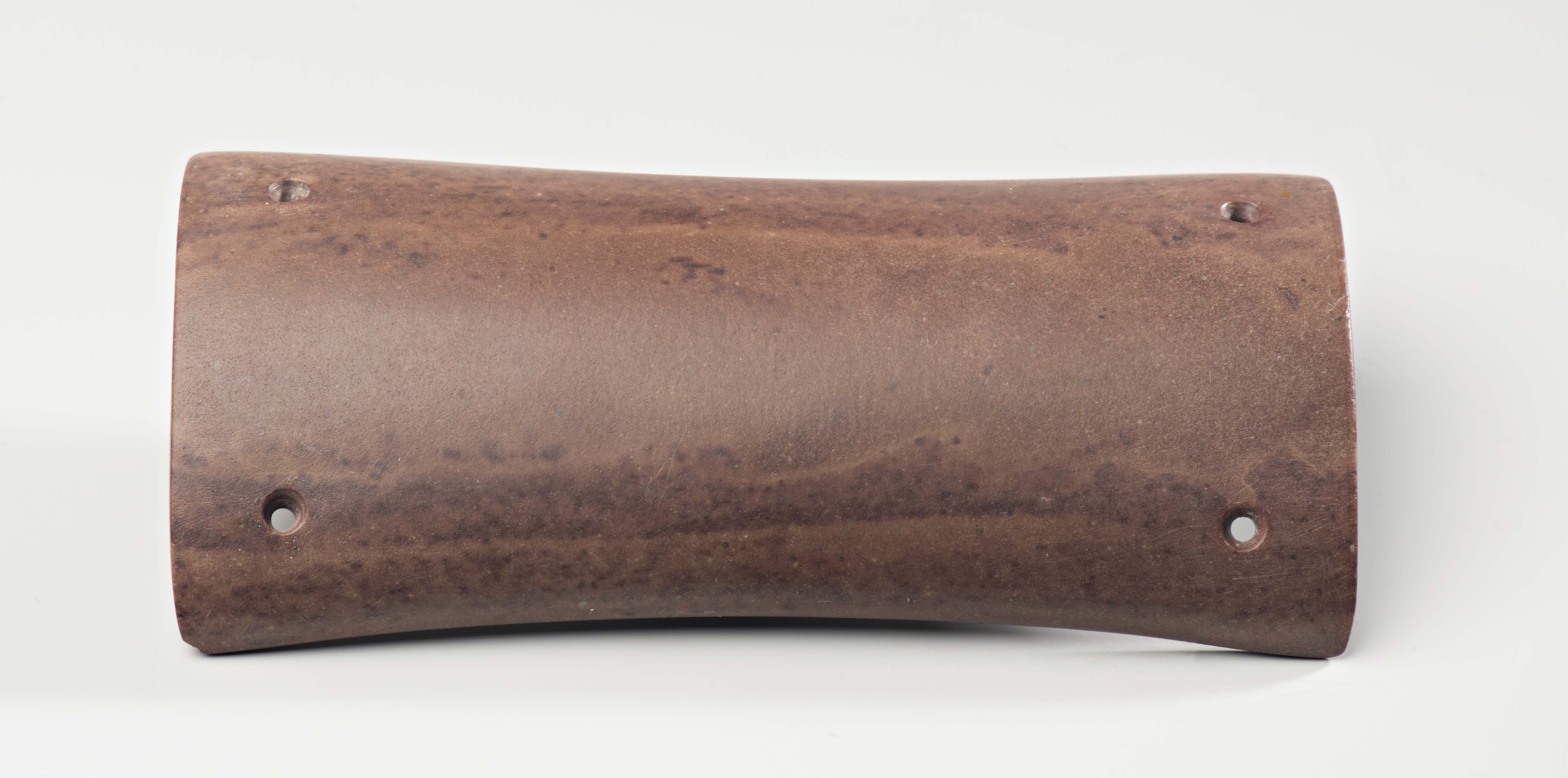
Stone wrist-guard from the Netherlands, Bell Beaker culture

It was originally thought that these stone wrist-guards were bracers, used by archers to protect their bow arms from the string of the bow. However, recent research has highlighted that (in Britain at least) they do not commonly occur in graves in association with arrowheads (the Amesbury Archer being a notable exception), nor are they commonly found on the part of the arm that would need protection from the bowstring (on a right-handed archer, the inside left wrist). However, of the 12 items identified as wrist-guards found in the burial ground in Holešov, in the Nitra culture graves most of them (7 of 9), and in the Bell Beaker culture graves some of them (1 of 3) were found in graves which also contained arrowheads.

They are usually found on the outside of the arm, where they would have been more conspicuous. Many have only two holes which would make them difficult to fasten securely to the arm, and some have projecting rivets which would catch on the bowstring and make them unsuitable for use as a bracer.

When the objects occur in barrows, they always occur in the central primary grave, a place thought to be reserved for heads of family and other important people. Many show great skill in polishing and stone working, and few are found in areas from which their stone originates. It seems likely that, as found in graves, these objects were used as symbols of status within family groups. They may have been status symbols of prowess in hunting or war, possibly mounted as decorations on functional bracers. However, one at least (from Barnack in Cambridgeshire) had eighteen holes and each one was filled with a foil-thin disc of gold; these caps would have prohibited any form of rivet or cord being used as a means of attachment. A few prehistoric wrist-guards made of gold or amber have also been found; these are generally accepted not to be functional.

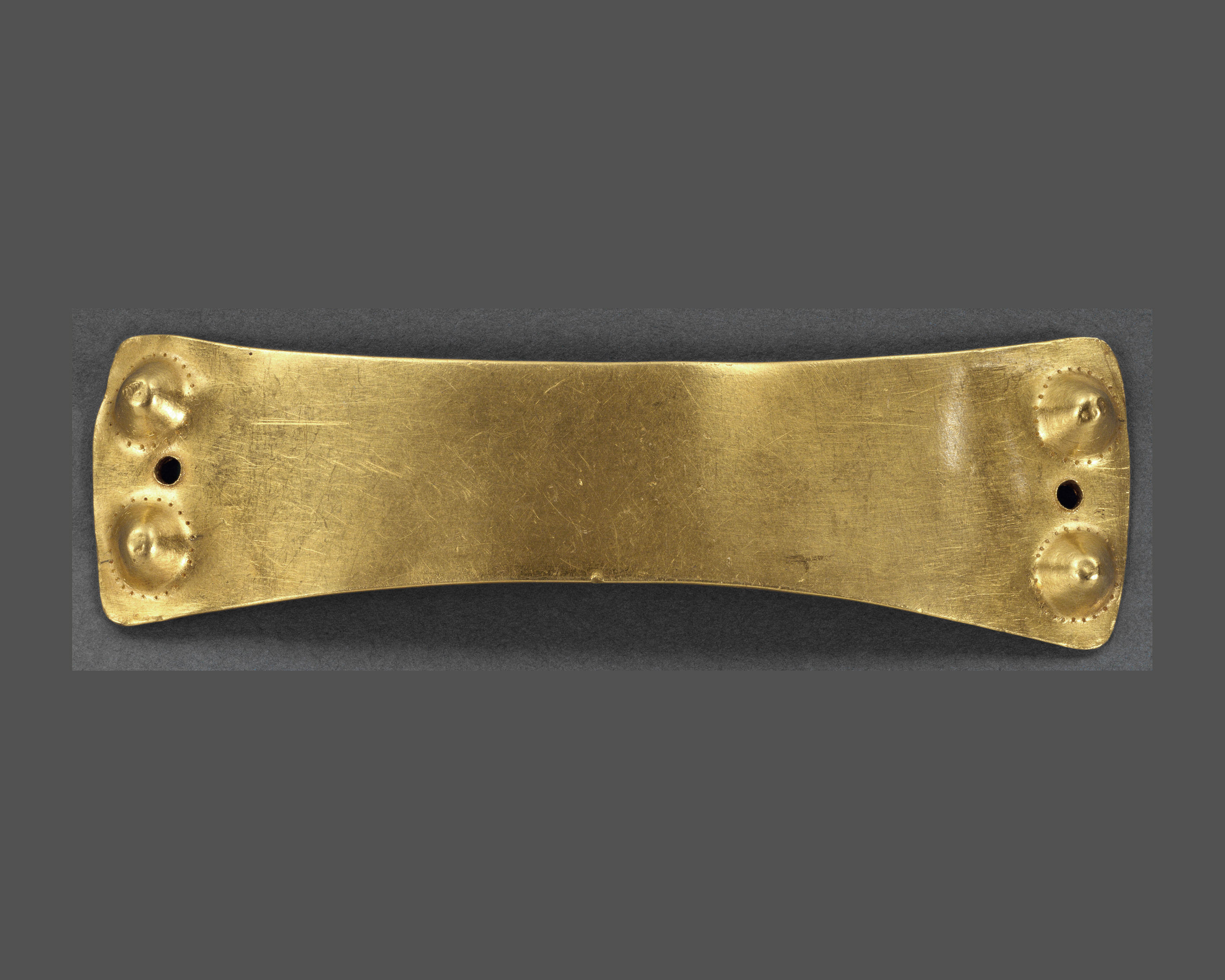
Gold wrist-guard from Portugal, Bronze Age

Famous burials containing stone wrist-guards include the Amesbury Archer and the Barnack burial.

Stephen Lalor, in a 2025 EXARC Journal piece, conducted practical studies on what stone wrist-guards may have been used for. His experience was that the guards were neither useful either to protect the forearm from the bow string, or strong enough to act as a shield on the outer arm. He concluded that they actually may have been portable whetstones used for sharpening copper knives, and this is supported by the fact that traces of copper have been found on wrist-guards, and that they disappeared shortly after bronze replaced copper as the dominant metal.

== Terminology ==
The wrist-guards are commonly classified following either the 1970 Atkinson classification (cited in Clarke 1970) or the 2006 Smith classification. Of the two, it is the 2006 Smith classification which is less rigid and more descriptive. It uses a three-character system to classify the objects on three simple characteristics:

Total number of perforations: (e.g., 2, 4, 6, etc.)

Shape in plan: described as-

- 'Waisted', having a narrow midsection
- 'Tapered', having narrow ends
- 'Straight-sided', having a rectangular plan

Shape in transverse cross-section: described as-

- 'Curved', having a concavo-convex cross-section
- 'Plano-Convex', having a plano-convex cross-section, (i.e. one side flat and the other curved)
- 'Flat', having a flat or slightly bi-convex cross-section

The most common types of wrist-guard are the 'tapered variety' consisting of 2TFs, 'straight variety' consisting mainly of 4SFs and 6SFs and the 'waisted variety' consisting mainly of 4WCs

This is how the 1970 Atkinson classification translates into the newer classificatory system:

A1 = 2TF

A2 = 4TF

B1 = 2SF

B2 = 4SF

B3 = 6SF

C1 = 4WC

C2 = 2WC
