= Amesbury Archer =

Remains of an early Bronze Age man

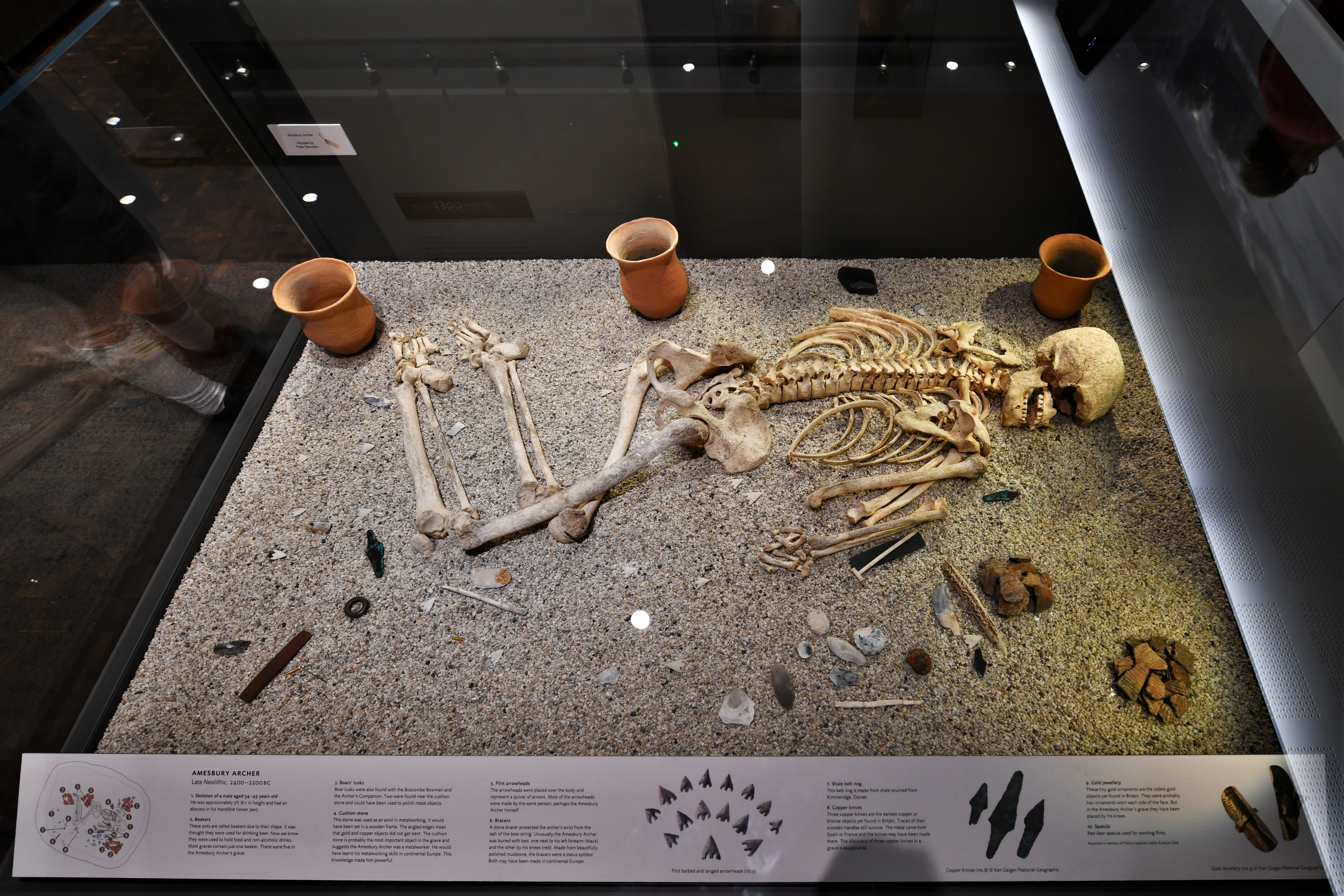
- Displayed in the Salisbury Museum
- Born: c. 2340 BC
- Died: c. 2300 BC (aged c. 40) now Amesbury, England, United Kingdom
- Body discovered: May 2002
- Resting place: Salisbury, England, United Kingdom

The Amesbury Archer (c. 2340 BC - c. 2300 BC) is an early Bronze Age (Bell Beaker) man whose grave was discovered during excavations at the site of a new housing development (grid reference SU16324043) in Amesbury near Stonehenge. The grave was uncovered in May 2002. The man was middle aged when he died, estimated between 35 and 45, around 2300 BC. He is nicknamed "Archer" because of the many arrowheads buried with him. The grave contained more artefacts than any other early British Bronze Age burial, including the earliest known gold objects ever found in England. It was the first evidence of a very high status and wealth expressed in a burial from that time. Previously, Bronze Age society had been assumed not to have been particularly hierarchical.

The calibrated radiocarbon dates for his grave, and dating of Stonehenge, suggest the sarsens and trilithons at Stonehenge may have been raised by the time he was born, although a new bluestone circle may have been raised around the time of his birth.

== Burial ==
The Archer's grave yielded the greatest number of artefacts ever found in a British burial from the Early Bronze Age. Among those discovered were: five funerary pots of the type associated with the Beaker culture; three tiny copper knives; sixteen barbed flint arrowheads; a kit of flint-knapping and metalworking tools, including cushion stones that functioned as a kind of portable anvil, which suggests he was a coppersmith; and some boar tusks. A piece of iron pyrite, which sparks when struck by flint to start a fire, had been well used with grooves worn along its sides. On his forearm was a black stone wrist-guard. A similar red wrist-guard was by his knees. With the second wrist-guard was a shale belt ring and a pair of gold hair ornaments, the oldest gold objects known from England.

The anatomy of the Archer has been well documented, with several unusual features including os acromiale whereby the acromion at the tip of the scapula was not fused as is usual, spina bifida occulta ('hidden' spina bifida) and a missing left patella. Research using oxygen isotope analysis in the Archer's tooth enamel has suggested that he originated from an alpine region of central Europe. An eroded hole in his jaw showed that he had had an abscess, and his missing left kneecap suggests that he had an injury that left him with a painful lingering bone infection.

His skeleton is now on display at the Salisbury Museum in Salisbury.

== Second burial ==
A male skeleton found interred nearby is believed to be that of a younger man related to the Archer, as they shared a rare hereditary anomaly, calcaneonavicular coalition, fusing of the calcaneus and of the navicular tarsal (foot bones). This younger man, sometimes called the Archer's Companion, appears to have been raised in a more local climate. The Archer was estimated to be about forty at the time of his death, while his companion was in his early twenties. The graves were discovered a short distance from the Boscombe Bowmen, whose bones were excavated the following year.

== Importance of the burials ==
The Archer was quickly dubbed the King of Stonehenge in the British press due to the proximity of the famous monument and some even suggested that he could have been involved in its construction. However, such speculations have been rejected by archaeologists.

His is just one high-profile burial that dates from around the time of the stones' erection, but given the lavish nature of the grave his mourners clearly considered him important enough to be buried near to (if not in the immediate area of) Stonehenge. Tim Darvill regards the skeleton as possibly that of a pilgrim visiting Stonehenge to draw on the 'healing properties' of the bluestones.

His grave is of particular importance because of its connections with Continental Europe and early copper smelting technology. He is believed to be one of the earliest gold metalworkers in Britain, and he provides an example of a person bringing Bell Beaker culture and its pottery directly from continental Europe.

== DNA analysis ==
The DNA of the Archer's skeleton was difficult to analyse at first and had to be omitted from a 2018 study of 226 Bell Beaker burials from across Europe, although DNA from the nearby 'Companion' was included in the study. Later, a successful sample was taken from the Archer and analysed. It appears that both the Archer and the Companion in the male line (Y-chromosome) had Steppe ancestry, the Archer being classified as R1b1a1b1a1a (haplogroup R-L151) and the Companion as R1b1a1b1a1a2c1 (haplogroup R-L21). The two men were not related in the 1st or 2nd degree, although a more distant relationship, such as great-grandfather / great-grandson, is possible.

A further finding was that the Archer had a greater amount of Early European Farmer ancestry (c. 45%) than the Companion (c. 33%).

It had already been shown from strontium and oxygen isotope analysis of the Archer's 2nd premolar and 3rd molar teeth (which mineralise at different ages) that the Archer spent his childhood in Central Europe, probably in the Western Alps. By contrast the Companion appears to have been born in Wessex, but spent part of his childhood in Europe, perhaps in the same region of the Western Alps.

== Language ==
Although the Archer may have spoken an Indo-European language, it does not follow that he spoke an early form of Irish or Welsh. The authors of a 2021 study of large-scale migration into Britain favour the view that Celtic languages were introduced by a much later influx of people from continental Europe which occurred in the Late Bronze Age between 1000 and 875 BC.

== In popular culture ==
The character of Arthmael in Mark Patton's novel Undreamed Shores is based on the Archer.

== See also ==
- Boscombe Bowmen
- Stonehenge Archer

== Bibliography ==
- Parker Pearson, Mike; Cleal, R; Marshall, P; Needham, S; Pollard, J; Richards, C; Ruggles, C; Sheridan, A; Thomas, J; Tilley, C; Welham, K; Chamberlain, A; Chenery, C; Evans, J; Knusel, C; Linford, N; Martin, L; Montgomery, J; Payne, A; Richards, M (August 2007). "The Age of Stonehenge" (PDF). Antiquity. 81 (313): 617–639. doi:10.1017/S0003598X00095624. S2CID 162960418.
- Parker Pearson, Mike (2005). Bronze Age Britain. London: English Heritage. ISBN 0-7134-8849-2.
- Richards, Julian (2007). Stonehenge: The Story so Far. Swindon: English Heritage. ISBN 978-1-905624-00-3.
- Taylor, Tim (2006). Time Team: What Happened When. London: 4 Books. ISBN 1-905026-09-9.
- Fitzpatrick, A.P. (2003). "The Amesbury Archer". Current Archaeology. 184: 146–152.
- Stone, R. (August 2005). "Mystery Man of Stonehenge". Smithsonian. pp. 62–67.
- Miles, D. (2005). The Tribes of Britain. pp. 78–82.
- Brayne, J. (2016). Archer, Journey to Stonehenge.
