= Adrian Green =

Museum director and curator

Adrian Green is a curator, and has been director of The Salisbury Museum in Wiltshire, England, since 2007.

Green trained as an archaeologist at the Institute of Archaeology and University College London, and his interests are focused on prehistory and Roman archaeology. He took an MA in Museum Studies (also known as museology) at Leicester University and holds the Associateship of the Museums Association.

He is the sixth director of the Salisbury Museum since 1860, and took over from Peter Saunders, who retired in the summer of 2007. Previously he was curator of archaeology at the Peterborough Museum and Art Gallery, and was involved in developing the London Before London gallery at the Museum of London. He then went on to be curator of Bromley Museum Services which houses the collection of the archaeologist Sir John Lubbock, 1st Lord Avebury.

Under Green's directorship, a new £2.4 million Wessex Gallery of Archaeology was opened at The Salisbury Museum in 2014, supported by grants from the Heritage Lottery Fund and other sources. The Wessex Gallery houses a resource on the prehistory of Stonehenge and the areas surrounding Salisbury, including the Amesbury Archer, the Wardour Hoard, and the collection of archaeology originally belonging to Augustus Pitt Rivers. Green published an article on the Pitt-Rivers collection in 2014 and has strengthened the museum's ties with those members of the local metal detecting community who work closely with the Portable Antiquities Scheme.

Green has also been responsible, with the Exhibitions Officer Kim Chittick, for developing The Salisbury Museum's Fine Art programme, with temporary exhibitions on John Constable, Cecil Beaton, Rex Whistler and others. The Salisbury Museum is winner of six major awards including a Museum of the Year award and the English Tourist Board England for Excellence. The archaeology collections are Designated Collections of national importance.
