= The Salisbury Museum =

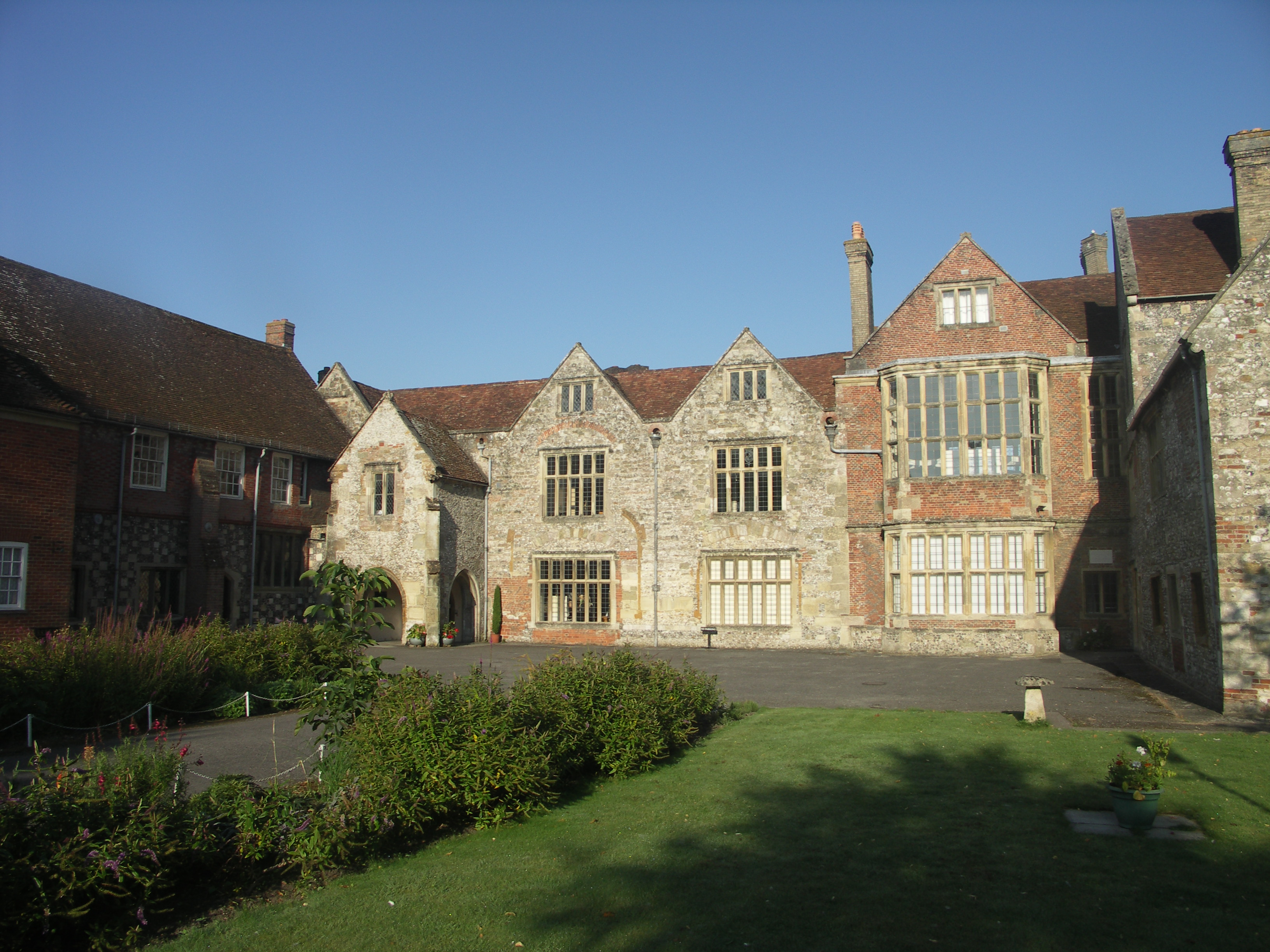
- Established: 1860
- Location: The King's House, Salisbury, Wiltshire, England
- Coordinates: 51.0645°N 1.8001°W
- Type: History museum
- Director: Adrian Green
- Website: www.salisburymuseum.org.uk

The Salisbury Museum (previously The Salisbury and South Wiltshire Museum) is a museum in Salisbury, Wiltshire, England. It houses one of the best collections relating to Stonehenge and local archaeology.

The museum is housed in The King's House, a Grade I listed building, where King James I of England was entertained in 1610 and 1613. Set in the surroundings of the Cathedral Close, the museum faces the west front of Salisbury Cathedral. Previously at 40-42 St Ann Street, where it had been founded in 1860 by Dr Richard Fowler, FRS, it transferred to its current site in 1981.

The original three-storey building, with mullioned and transomed windows, ornate plaster ceilings and a fine oak-balustraded staircase, houses the main temporary exhibition gallery with the ceramics gallery above. The arms of James I's eldest son, Henry Frederick, Prince of Wales, can be seen in a window in the Wedgwood gallery upstairs.

The director of the museum is Adrian Green. He is supported by chief operating officer Lucy Bridal.

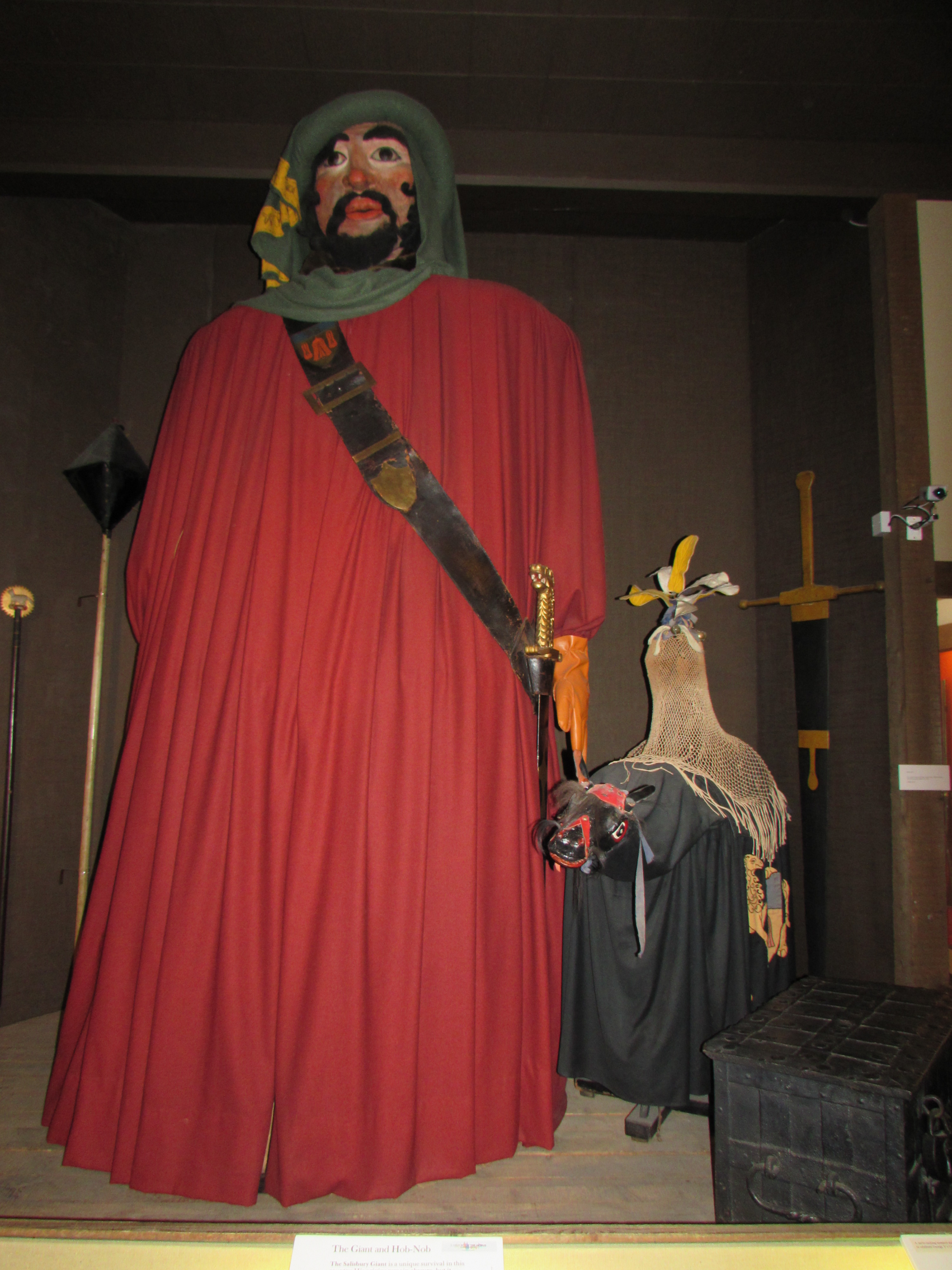
The Salisbury Giant, a 12 feet tall medieval figure, with Hobnob

== Temporary exhibitions ==
Summer exhibitions since 2011 have featured artists who share a close connection with the locality.

- In 2011, the temporary exhibition was 'Constable and Salisbury'. Timed to coincide with the 200th anniversary of John Constable's first visit to Salisbury, the exhibition contained over forty original oil paintings, watercolours and drawings, including the famous 'Salisbury Cathedral from the Meadows'.
- In the summer of 2012, Salisbury Museum presented 'Circles And Tangents' featuring the work of artists connected with Cranborne Chase, including Augustus John, Henry Lamb, Ben Nicholson, John Craxton, Lucian Freud, Stanley Spencer, Elisabeth Frink, William Nicholson and over 25 others.
- From May to September 2013, Rex Whistler: 'A Talent Cut Short' was the temporary exhibition.
- The summer exhibition for 2015 was 'Turner's Wessex: Architecture and Ambition'. It featured a collection of brilliant watercolours made by J. M. W. Turner as a young man in the Salisbury area, and was curated by Ian Warrell.
- In 2017 the summer exhibition was 'Ancient Landscapes', showcasing works from such artists as William Blake, Barbara Hepworth and Paul Nash. The works had the subject of Stonehenge and the surrounding Salisbury Plain. On three days in August, there was a theatre production in the gardens of the museum by Stage '65, Salisbury Playhouse's youth theatre.

== Notable objects ==
=== Lake House meteorite ===
On 10 September 2012, a 90 kilograms (200 lb) meteorite, possibly the biggest to have ever fallen on the British Isles, went on display at the museum. For at least 80 years it sat near the front door of Lake House at Wilsford-cum-Lake near Salisbury. When the house was sold, the stone was confirmed as a meteorite by the Natural History Museum where it remained in storage for many years. Professor Colin Pillinger, known for his work on the Beagle 2 Mars spacecraft, had been studying a smaller meteorite from the Danebury Hill Fort in Hampshire and felt that there could be a connection between the two. The meteorite from Lake House was retrieved from storage and although the two objects were found to be unrelated, Professor Pillinger continued with his study of the larger meteorite.

The meteorite landed on earth some 30,000 years ago and was apparently preserved by the frozen conditions during the last ice age. In normal circumstances the meteorite would have disintegrated, but the cold and ice helped preserve it. Thousands of years later, in the Stone or Bronze Age, it is thought that the meteorite was built into a burial mound close to Lake House. The local chalk environment would again have helped to preserve it. The meteorite may have been unearthed in the 19th century by Edward Duke, a previous owner of Lake House who was an antiquarian who excavated burial mounds nearby and had his own private museum. Photographic evidence shows it on the doorstep of Lake House at the time the property was owned by the brewer Joseph Lovibond, Mayor of Salisbury in 1878–79 and 1890–91.

=== Prehistoric hoards ===
In November 2011 the Museum displayed the Wardour Hoard of over 100 copper alloy objects, over 2,700 years old, from the late Bronze Age and early Iron Age. It was found near Wardour by a metal detectorist, and consists of tools such as axe heads, chisels, sickles and gouges, as well as spearheads, daggers, knives, swords and scabbard fittings. It was the most important hoard to have been found in Wiltshire since the discovery of the Salisbury Hoard in the 1980s.

In around 2014, the museum acquired the Wylye Hoard.

== The New Wessex Gallery of Archaeology ==
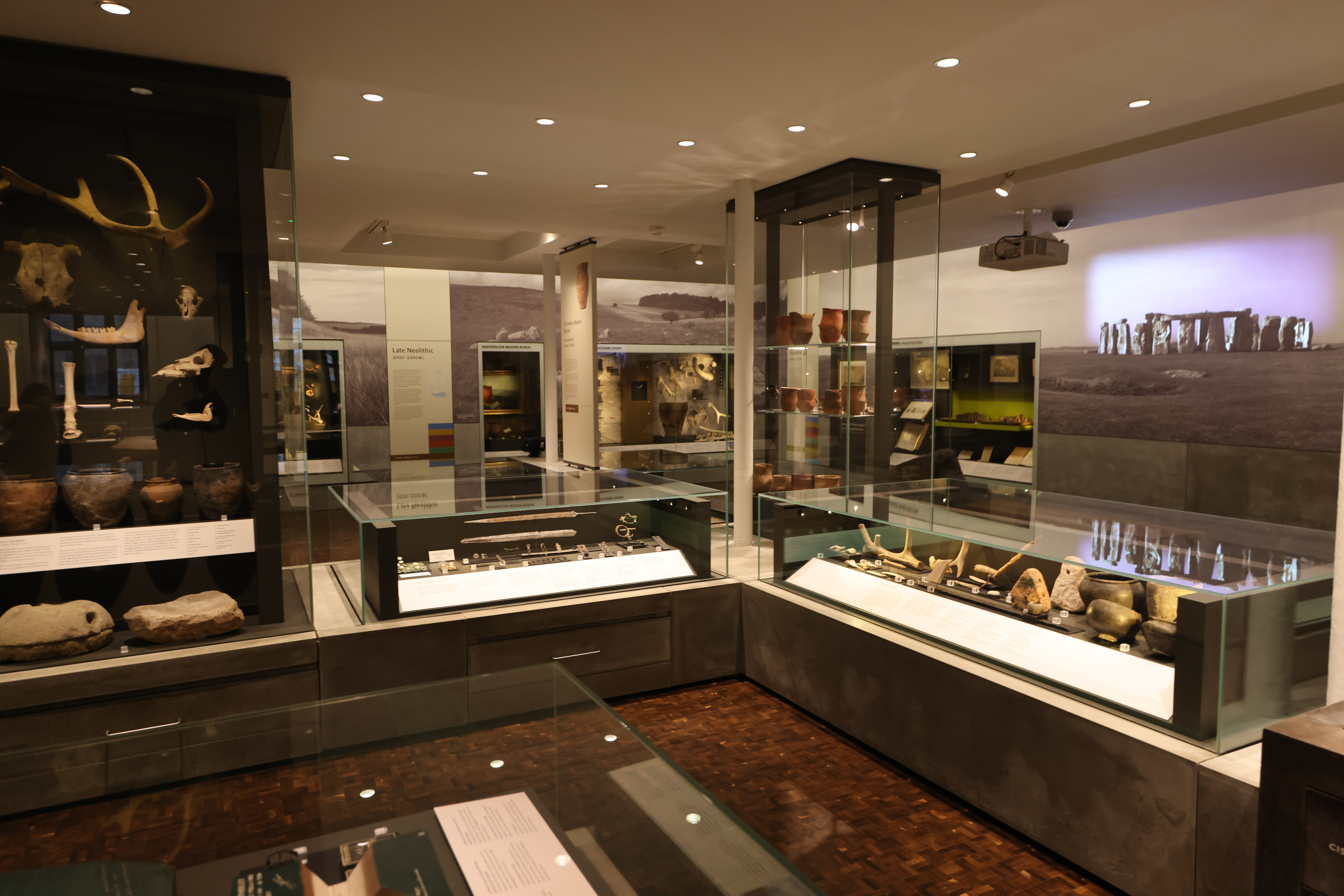
Part of the Wessex Gallery

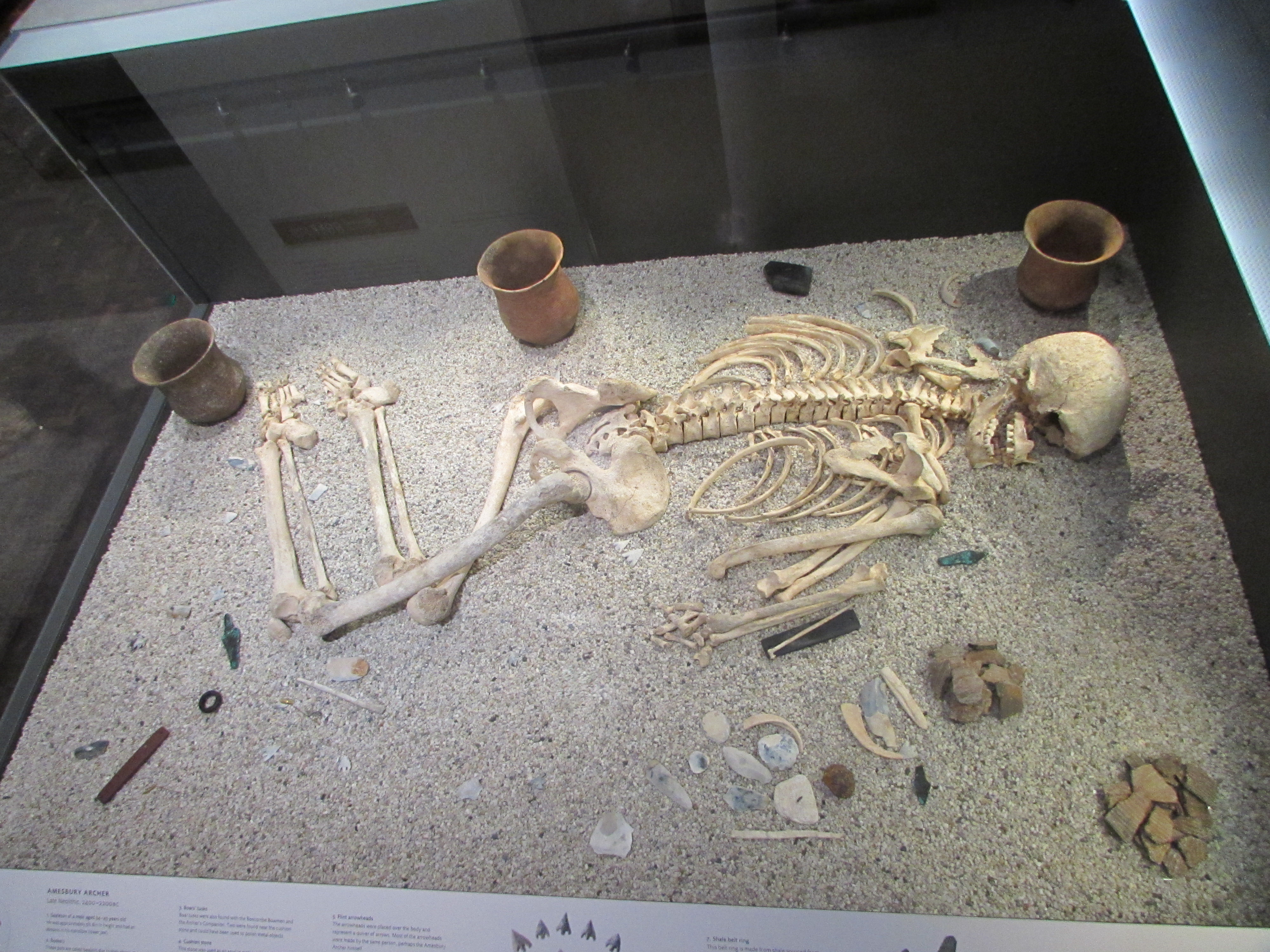
The Amesbury Archer

In June 2012, the Heritage Lottery Fund (HLF) awarded Salisbury Museum a grant of £1,794,600 towards the development of a new Archaeology of Wessex gallery. The new gallery opened in the summer of 2014 and is of international importance, telling the story of Salisbury and the surrounding area from prehistoric times to the Norman Conquest, and showing why Salisbury has a unique place in history. The museum's collections include some of the most important archaeological finds in Britain, including artefacts from the Stonehenge World Heritage Site, the Pitt Rivers Wessex Collection and the Amesbury Archer.

== Other collections ==
A £350,000 grant from the National Heritage Memorial Fund was awarded in August 2013, to help save the personal archive of Rex Whistler. The Salisbury Museum then purchased the archive, which contains over 1,000 items and is the only substantial collection of material relating to the artist.

The Museum has an art collection of over 4,000 paintings, prints and drawings, representing local personalities, topographical scenes, special events and everyday life, or created by local artists of note. An outstanding Costume Collection includes clothes relating to the people in and around Salisbury over the past 250 years, including wedding dresses, uniforms, formal wear and lace samples produced by Downton Lace. The Museum also has an outstanding collection of ceramics. Local Verwood and Wiltshire Brown ware is represented alongside the celebrated Wedgwood, Bow and Chelsea potteries. The Museum also has a collection illustrating the history of the Salisbury cutlery industry.

== See also ==
- Stonehenge Archer
- Amesbury Archer
- Wiltshire Museum
