= Mark Patton (archaeologist) =

British archaeologist and novelist (born 1965)

Mark Patton (born 7 January 1965 in Jersey) is a British archaeologist and novelist known for his work on the prehistory of the Channel Islands and North-Western France, particularly the archaeology of megaliths, as well as the prehistory of the Mediterranean islands, the theory of island biogeography and the history of European archaeology. He is also the author of three historical novels, Undreamed Shores (2012), An Accidental King (2013) and Omphalos (2014).

== Biography ==
Patton was educated at Hautlieu School, Jersey, and went up to Clare College, Cambridge in 1983 to read Archaeology & Anthropology. He completed his PhD thesis at University College London in 1990 on Neolithic Communities of the Channel Islands. He has lectured at Trinity College Carmarthen, the University of Greenwich and the University of Westminster (at which he was formerly the Dean of their Harrow Business School.). Between 1991 and 1995, he led the excavations at La Hougue Bie, Jersey. In 1997, Patton unsuccessfully contested the Lewes Parliamentary Constituency for the Labour Party. In 2001, he was elected a Fellow of the Royal Society of Arts, and was the following year appointed as a member of the governing body of the Museum of London.

== Books ==
- Patton, M.A. 1987 Jersey In Prehistory. Jersey, La Haule Books. ISBN 9780861200177
- Patton, M.A. 1994 Statements in Stone: Monuments and Society in Neolithic Brittany. London, Routledge. ISBN 978-0-415-06729-4
- Patton, M.A. 1995 Neolithic Communities of the Channel Islands. Oxford, British Archaeological Reports.
- Patton, M.A. 1997 Islands in Time: Island Sociogeography and Mediterranean Prehistory. London, Routledge. ISBN 978-0-415-12659-5
- Patton, M.A., Rodwell, W. & Finch, O. 1999 La Hougue Bie, Jersey: a Study of the Neolithic Tomb, Medieval Chapels and Prince's Tower, including a Report on the 1991-1994 Excavation. Jersey, Societe Jersiaise.
- Patton, M.A. & Finlaison, M. 2001 Patterns in a Prehistoric Landscape: the Archaeology of Les Mielles, Jersey. Jersey, Société Jersiaise.
- Patton, M.A. 2007 Science, Politics & Business in the Work of Sir John Lubbock: a Man of Universal Mind. Aldershot, Ashgate. ISBN 978-0-7546-5321-9.
- Patton, M.A. 2012 Undreamed Shores, Edinburgh, Crooked Cat Publications. ISBN 1908910410; ISBN 978-1908910417.
- Patton, M.A. 2013 An Accidental King, Edinburgh, Crooked Cat Publications. ISBN 1908910879; ISBN 978-1908910875.
- Patton, M.A. 2014 "Omphalos," Edinburgh, Crooked Cat Publications. ISBN 978-1-910510-06-3.
