= Aubrey holes =

Ring of chalk pits at Stonehenge

Coordinates: 51.179133°N 1.825593°W

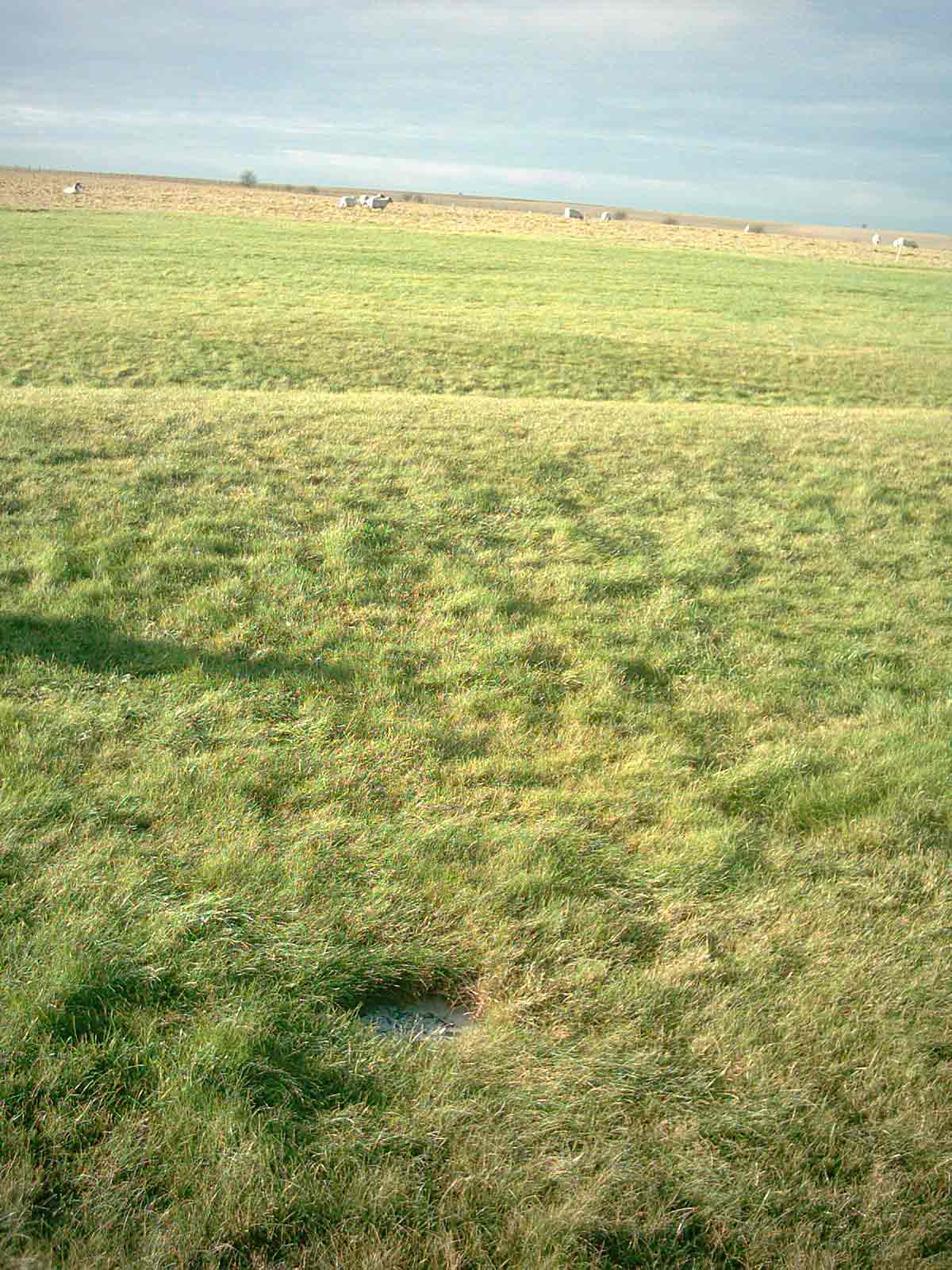
A white disc marks the location of Aubrey hole number 21 on the western side of the southern entrance to Stonehenge. The monument's encircling bank and ditch are visible behind it.

The Aubrey holes are a ring of 56 chalk pits at Stonehenge, named after seventeenth-century antiquarian John Aubrey. They date to the earliest phases of Stonehenge in the late fourth and early third millennium BC. Despite decades of argument and analysis, their purpose is still unknown, although an astronomical role has often been suggested.

Whilst visiting the monument in 1666, Aubrey noticed five circular cavities in the ground and noted them in his records. These features were ignored or not seen by the later antiquarians to investigate the site, and it was not until the 1920s during the work carried out by Colonel William Hawley that Hawley's assistant Robert Newall identified a ring of pits he named in honour of Aubrey and his early survey.

The depressions seen by Aubrey himself are more likely to have been different features from those that bear his name. Mike Pitts in a 1981 article in Nature pointed out that the holes had been backfilled thousands of years before Aubrey visited the site. The presence of later cremation burials and sarsen stone chips in the holes' upper fills supports this. That none of the other antiquarians who visited the site noticed any such holes implies that they were not permanent features either. Pitts argues that they were more likely to be the cavities left by features that had recently been removed. He has suggested that perhaps further megaliths stood at Stonehenge which occupied these other holes and have since been lost.

== The holes ==
25 of the holes were excavated by Hawley in 1920 and seven more in 1924. In 1950 Stuart Piggott and Richard Atkinson dug two more Aubrey Holes which brought the total excavated to 35, including one that Richard Colt Hoare may have encountered whilst digging beneath the fallen Slaughter Stone (so named from its reddish coloration) in the early nineteenth century. It was found that the pits were an average of 0.76m deep and 1.06m in diameter. 25 of the pits contained later cremation burials inserted into their upper fills along with long bone pins which may have secured leather or cloth bags used to hold the remains. Their presence makes Stonehenge Britain's oldest cremation cemetery.

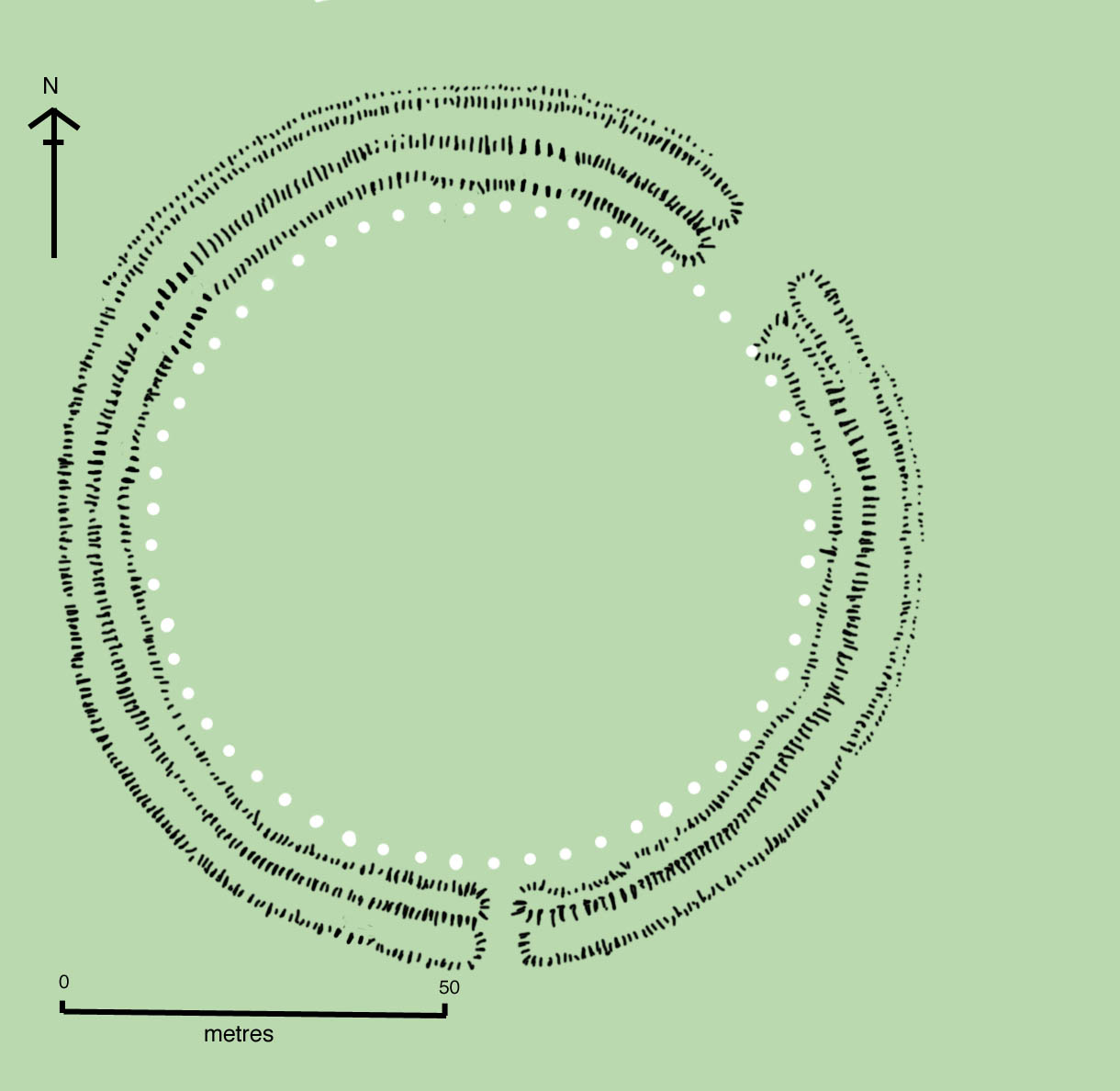
Plan of Stonehenge 1 with the Aubrey holes shown as white circles. After Cleal et al.

The pits appear to have been refilled with the freshly excavated chalk rubble soon after being dug as no weathering has been noted on the chalk sides of the pits. They may also have been dug out and refilled numerous times. The holes are in an accurate, 271.6m circumference circle, distributed around the edge of the area enclosed by Stonehenge's earth bank, with a standard deviation in their positioning of 0.4m. The circle they describe is around 5m inside the monument's bank. 21 of the holes remain unexcavated and no reliable dating material has been recovered from the other 35. The only available carbon date from the holes comes from charcoal in one of the later cremations. It gives the broad range of 2919–1519 BC. That sarsen stone chips have only been found in the upper fills of the excavated pits implies that the digging of the holes predates the megalithic phases of Stonehenge. From this stratigraphic evidence it is therefore likely that the holes were dug during the first phase of the monument, Stonehenge 1 (around 3100 BC) and were then reused for burials during Stonehenge 2 in successive centuries. By the time the standing stones of Stonehenge 3 were erected (around 2600 BC), the holes had fallen out of use.

The positions of the holes are marked at the Stonehenge site by white discs laid in the ground surface. Archaeologists number them 1 to 56 counting clockwise from the later Slaughter Stone at the eastern side of the north east entrance. Hawley reburied the human cremations he found, placing them in the backfilled hole number 7. These remains were re-excavated in August 2008 as part of the Stonehenge Riverside Project. A plaque dating from the 1935 reburial was uncovered at the site. The project was detailed in a 2010 episode of the PBS TV series Nova.

== Theories about the holes ==
Many interpretations prefer an astronomical explanation for the purpose of the holes although this is unproven. It was formerly thought that when the Aubrey holes were first dug, the only standing feature at Stonehenge was the Heelstone, which marked the point of the midsummer sunrise, viewed from the centre of the henge. But the Heelstone was later attributed to Stonehenge 3 and therefore not contemporary with the holes.

It has been suggested that the Aubrey holes were intended to be postholes containing timbers or stones but this is uncertain. Analogous timber circles at sites such as Woodhenge have influenced this interpretation; the positioning of the Aubrey Hole circle relative to the earth bank and ditch at Stonehenge is reproduced at similar sites with rings of timber postholes. That the holes appear to have been filled soon after excavation and then possibly redug does not exclude the possibility that they held timber posts which were replaced intermittently. No evidence of postpipes has been recovered with the holes although modern archaeological excavation techniques have not been used. If the putative timbers were purposefully removed when they fell out of use, then even this evidence would be difficult to spot. The lack of full documentation from the early Stonehenge digs in the twentieth century and the disturbance caused by the insertion of the later cremations during Stonehenge 2 have also added to the uncertainty over the function of the holes.

In a survey of twentieth-century excavations at Stonehenge, English Heritage's Stonehenge in its landscape, archaeologist Karen Walker collated and studied the surviving records from all the earlier work on the holes and concluded that "Although the evidence is inconclusive, and will no doubt be the subject of continued debate, the authors are inclined to support the view that the Aubrey Holes held posts, which were removed, rather than burnt in situ or left to decay."

In August 2008, further excavation of Aubrey Hole 7 by Mike Parker Pearson, Mike Pitts and Julian Richards led the archaeologists to suggest that the 56 holes had held Welsh bluestones, since they are too shallow to be postholes. The holes are identical in width, depth, and shape to those located elsewhere in Stonehenge. They are confident that the Aubrey holes belong to Stonehenge's initial phase of construction. Professor Parker Pearson said: "It's very exciting that we have evidence for stones right from its beginnings around 3000 BC. That's almost 500 years earlier than anyone had thought."

== Archaeoastronomy and the Aubrey Holes ==
The astronomical readings of the holes are largely a product of the interpretation of them as being simple pits without any structural features. This approach has required finding an explanation which tends towards the theory that the holes were repeatedly dug, filled and redug and excludes possibilities relating to any possible timber posts standing in them. The theory that they may have been used to hold temporary markers for use in astronomical observations gained credence in the 1960s.

An early attempt to analyse the positions of the Aubrey holes was undertaken by Gerald Hawkins, a professor of astronomy at Boston University in the 1960s, using an IBM 7090 computer. In his book Stonehenge Decoded, Hawkins argued that the various features at the Stonehenge monument were arranged in such a way to predict a variety of astronomical events. He believed that the key to the holes' purpose was the lunar eclipse, which occurs on average about twice a year on a 346.62 day cycle (the eclipse year). Every 18 to 19 years (18.61 to be precise) moonrise attains its extreme azimuth on the horizon. As the motion of the Moon's orbit causes it to swing on this 18.61-year cycle in its journey between major and minor lunistice and back, the theory that this period was both measurable and useful to Neolithic peoples seemed attractive.

Lunar movements may have had calendrical significance to early peoples, especially farmers who would have benefited from the division of the year into periods which indicated the best times for planting. 18.61 is not a whole number and so it cannot be used to predict an eclipse without precision equipment, using only crude marker stones or timber posts in a circle instead. Hawkins' theory was that three 18.61 year cycles multiply out to 55.83, which is much closer to an integer and therefore easier to mark using 56 holes. Hawkins argued that the Aubrey Holes were used to keep track of this long time period and could accurately predict the recurrence of a lunar eclipse on the same azimuth, that which aligned with the Heel Stone, every 56 years. Going further, by placing marker stones at the ninth, eighteenth, twenty-eighth, thirty-seventh, forty-sixth and fifty sixth holes, Hawkins deduced that other intermediate lunar eclipses could also be predicted.

More recent examination by Richard Atkinson proved Hawkins largely wrong, as he established that the different features at the monument that Hawkins tried to incorporate into many of his alignment theories were in use at different times and could not have worked alone, the late installation of the Heel Stone being the final nail in the coffin. Furthermore, the 56-year period is not a reliable method of predicting eclipses: they never repeat their date and position over three consecutive 18.61 year-long lunar cycles. Hawkins' theories also required strict observance of the phases of the moon which further complicated predictions using his model.

In 1966 Sir Fred Hoyle examined the arguments in favour of an astronomical purpose for the holes and concluded that the 28 day lunar cycle could still have been indicated by moving a marker stone representing the moon anticlockwise by two holes every day, ending up with 56 holes in total. By moving another marker anticlockwise two holes every 13 days, which represented the Sun, an annual journey around the circle could also be made. Two further marker stones would also have had to be moved round 3 holes per year to represent the points where the moon (or rather its marker) crossed the Sun marker's path. Hoyle proved that this could have been used to produce a much more reliable method of predicting eclipses as whenever the moon and sun markers are directly opposite each other and the other two stones occupy those same opposing points, an eclipse can be guaranteed. This has the additional benefit of not needing any standing stones at the site.

On astronomical symbolism several analysts from Gerald Hawkins to Anthony Johnson have noted that Plutarch reported that Set in Egyptian myth or Typhon in Greek myth was identified as the shadow of the Earth which covers the Moon during lunar eclipses. Plutarch further records that the Pythagoreans symbolically associated Typhon with a polygon of 56 sides, hence the connection of 56 to lunar eclipses is explicit, at least for the Hellenistic era. Although less complex and romantic than Hawkins' 'Stone Age calculator' such a technique is feasible in theory. More elaborate predictive practices have also been suggested for the holes although all these methods, including Hoyle's, require a high level of astronomical awareness and a grasp of abstract concepts including knowing where and when to first position the stones around the circle. It has also been pointed out by R. Colton and R. L. Martin that simpler methods exist, based on observing the position of each moonrise, which would have worked just as well and which would not require moving numerous markers amongst 56 holes. This diminishes the astronomical significance of the number of the Aubrey Holes and their circular arrangement and suggests that any astronomical purpose for the site may have been no more than symbolic.

According to the astrologers Bruno and Louise Huber the Aubrey holes were an astronomical abacus to mark the positions and calculate the movement of lunar nodes.

== Extra-astronomical interpretations ==
Mike Pitts has asserted that the Aubrey Holes did in fact originally hold timbers and compares the site at this stage to Woodhenge, The Sanctuary near Avebury and other Neolithic timber circles. Such a view contradicts the archaeo-astronomical view of the holes as being a unique predictive device.

In fact, early Stonehenge may have been barely different from the other Neolithic timber circles of the British Isles, which had varying numbers of postholes and orientations and could therefore not have been used for in island-wide eclipse predicting. The interpretation of such timber circles is unclear, although parallels were drawn with Native American totem poles by Stuart Piggott in a 1946 BBC radio lecture. A 50 cm high carved wooden figure found in the Thames Marshes in 1912 and carbon dated to 2460–1980 BC has been used rather tenuously to support the theory of carved wooden posts serving a more terrestrial purpose.

Another possible explanation for the holes, suggested by Richard Atkinson, is that they were excavated in turn in some unknown ritual involving a procession around the inside of the monument. Others have pointed out the significance of the 28-day human menstrual cycle and argued that the holes may have been fertility indicators. Alexander Thom calculated that the circle of holes had been laid out in a circumference of 131 of his megalithic rods although this number has no known significance. A recent CAD study of the holes has shown that a 56-sided polygon can be generated by the simple use of square and circle geometry. Aubrey Burl also notes that the azimuth of the Heel Stone, beyond the Aubrey Circle, marks the midpoint in the swing of the Moon between major and minor standstill points, at 51.3 degrees.

The true purpose of the holes may never be known, although future excavation of the remaining twenty-four using modern archaeological techniques will certainly provide more information.

== Bibliography ==
- Cleal, Rosamund M.J.; Walker, K.E.; Montague, R. (1995). Stonehenge in its Landscape: Twentieth century excavations. London, UK: English Heritage. ISBN 1-85074-605-2.
- Hawkins, Gerald S.; White, John B. (1965). Stonehenge Decoded. Garden City, NY: Doubleday. ISBN 0-88029-147-8.
- Johnson, Anthony (2008). Solving Stonehenge: The new key to an ancient enigma. Thames & Hudson. ISBN 978-0-500-05155-9.
- Pitts, M. W. (5 March 1981). "Stones, pits, and Stonehenge". Nature. 290 (5801): 46–47. Bibcode:1981Natur.290...46P. doi:10.1038/290046a0. ISSN 0028-0836. S2CID 4347446.
- Pitts, Mike (2000). Hengeworld. London, UK: Century. ISBN 0-7126-7954-5.
- Pitts, Mike (15 July 2004). "Aubrey Holes". JISCMail: BRITARCH mailing list. Archived from the original on 27 September 2007.
- Wood, John Edwin (1978). Sun, Moon, and Standing Stones. Oxford, UK: Oxford University Press. ISBN 0-19-211443-3.
