= Archaeoastronomy and Stonehenge =

Stonehenge's use in tracking seasons

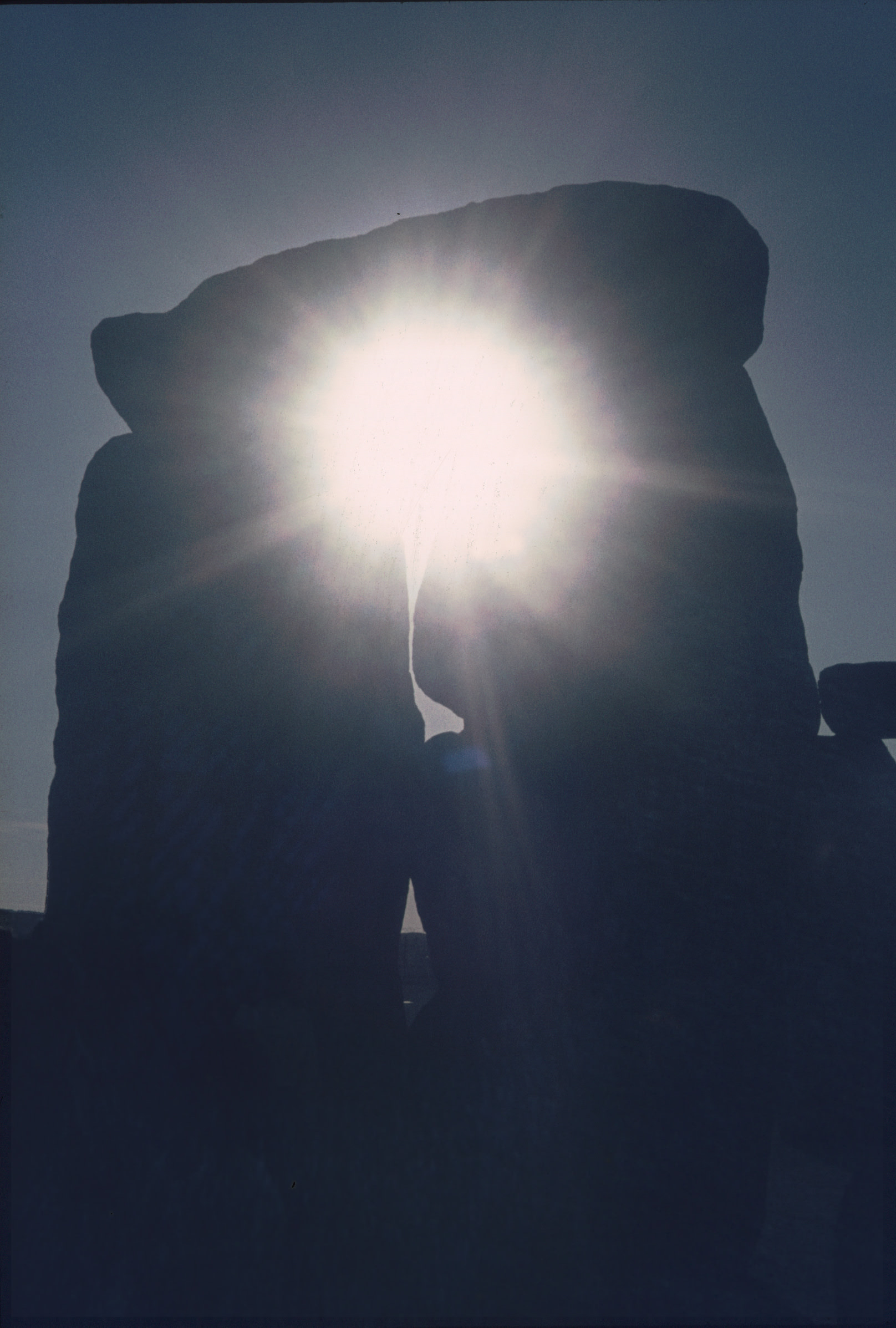
The sunlight shining through a trilithon at Stonehenge

The prehistoric monument of Stonehenge has long been studied for its possible connections with ancient astronomy. The site is aligned in the direction of the sunrise of the summer solstice and the sunset of the winter solstice.

== Early work ==
Directions of sunrise and sunset at Stonehenge on the 21st of each month, where 𝜙 is its latitude and 𝜀 is Earth's axial tilt

Stonehenge has an opening in the henge earthwork facing northeast, and suggestions that particular significance was placed by its builders on the solstice and equinox points have followed. For example, the summer solstice Sun rose close to the Heel Stone, and the Sun's first rays shone into the centre of the monument between the horseshoe arrangement. While it is possible that such an alignment could be coincidental, this astronomical orientation had been acknowledged since William Stukeley drew the site and first identified its axis along the midsummer sunrise in 1720.

Stukeley noticed that the Heel Stone was not precisely aligned on the sunrise. The drifting of the position of the sunrise due to the change in the obliquity of the ecliptic since the monument's erection does not account for this imprecision. Recently, evidence has been found for a neighbour to the Heel Stone, no longer extant. The second stone may have instead been one side of a 'solar corridor' used to frame the sunrise.

Stukeley and the renowned astronomer Edmund Halley attempted what amounted to the first scientific attempt to date a prehistoric monument. Stukeley concluded the Stonehenge had been set up "by the use of a magnetic compass to lay out the works, the needle varying so much, at that time, from true north". He attempted to calculate the change in magnetic variation between the observed and theoretical (ideal) Stonehenge sunrise, which he imagined would relate to the date of construction. Their calculations returned three dates, the earliest of which, 460 BC, was accepted by Stukeley. That was incorrect, but this early exercise in dating is a landmark in field archaeology.

Early efforts to date Stonehenge exploited changes in astronomical declinations and led to efforts such as H. Broome's 1864 theory that the monument was built in 977 BC, when the star Sirius would have risen over Stonehenge's Avenue. Sir Norman Lockyer proposed a date of 1680 BC based entirely on an incorrect sunrise azimuth for the Avenue, aligning it on a nearby Ordnance Survey trig point, a modern feature. Petrie preferred a later date of 730 AD. The relevant stones were leaning considerably during his survey, and it was not considered accurate.

An archaeoastronomy debate was triggered by the 1963 publication of Stonehenge Decoded, by Gerald Hawkins, an American astronomer. Hawkins claimed to observe numerous alignments, both lunar and solar. He argued that Stonehenge could have been used to predict eclipses. Hawkins' book received wide publicity, in part because he used a computer in his calculations, then a novelty. Archaeologists were suspicious in the face of further contributions to the debate coming from British astronomer C. A. 'Steve' Newham and Sir Fred Hoyle, the famous Cambridge cosmologist, as well as by Alexander Thom, a retired professor of engineering, who had been studying stone circles for more than 20 years. Their theories have faced criticism in recent decades from Richard J. C. Atkinson and others who have suggested impracticalities in the 'Stone Age calculator' interpretation.

== Gerald Hawkins' work ==
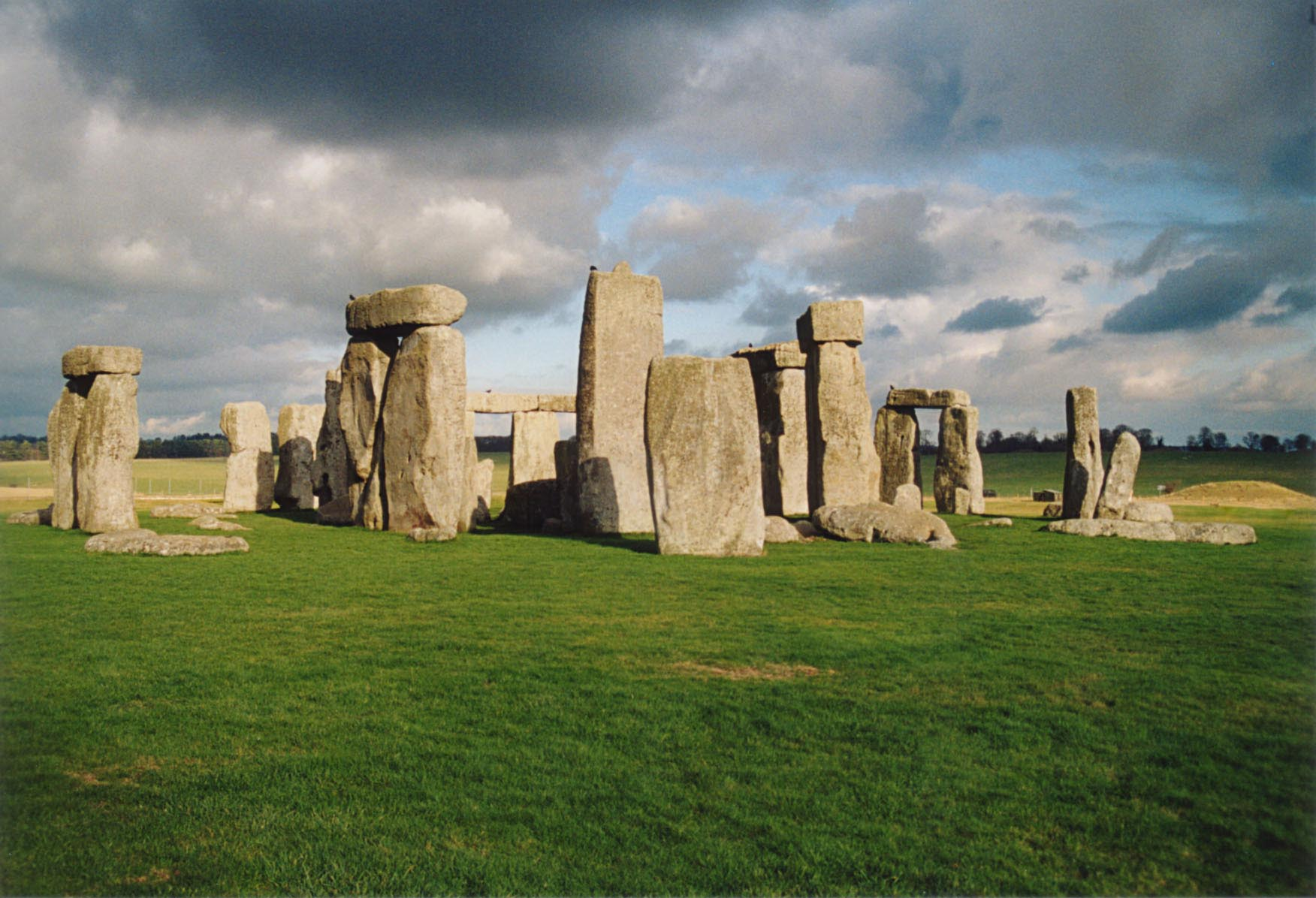
Stonehenge in 2004

Gerald Hawkins' work on Stonehenge was first published in Nature in 1963 following analyses he had carried out using the Harvard-Smithsonian IBM computer. Hawkins found not one or two alignments but dozens. He had studied 165 significant features of the monument and used the computer to check every alignment between them against every rising and setting point for the Sun, Moon, planets, and bright stars in the positions they would have occupied in 1500 BC. Thirteen solar and eleven lunar correlations were very precise in relation to the early features at the site but precision was less for later features of the monument. Hawkins also proposed a method for using the Aubrey holes to predict lunar eclipses by moving markers from hole to hole. In 1965 Hawkins and J.B. White wrote Stonehenge Decoded, which detailed his findings and proposed that the monument was a 'Neolithic computer'.

Atkinson replied with his article "Moonshine on Stonehenge" in Antiquity in 1966, pointing out that some of the pits which Hawkins had used for his sight lines were more likely to have been natural depressions, and that he had allowed a margin of error of up to 2 degrees in his alignments. Atkinson found that the probability of so many alignments being visible from 165 points to be close to 0.5 (or rather 50:50) rather than the "one in a million" possibility which Hawkins had claimed. That the Station Stones stood on top of the earlier Aubrey Holes meant that many of Hawkins' alignments between the two features were illusory. The same article by Atkinson contains further criticisms of the interpretation of Aubrey Holes as astronomical markers, and of Fred Hoyle's work.

A question exists over whether the English climate would have permitted accurate observation of astronomical events. Modern researchers were looking for alignments with phenomena they already knew existed; the prehistoric users of the site did not have this advantage.

== Newham and the Station Stones ==
In 1966, C. A. 'Peter' Newham described an alignment for the equinoxes by drawing a line between one of the Station Stones with a posthole next to the Heel Stone. He also identified a lunar alignment; the long sides of the rectangle created by the four station stones matched the Moon rise and moonset at the major standstill. Newham also suggested that the postholes near the entrance were used for observing the saros cycle.

Two of the Station Stones are damaged and although their positions would create an approximate rectangle, their date and thus their relationship with the other features at the site is uncertain. Stonehenge's latitude (51°10′44″N) is unusual in that only at this approximate latitude (within about 50 km) do the lunar and solar alignments mentioned above occur at right angles to one another. More than 50 km north or south of the latitude of Stonehenge, the station stones could not be set out as a rectangle.

== Alexander Thom's work ==
Alexander Thom had been examining stone circles since the 1950s in search of astronomical alignments and the megalithic yard. It was not until 1973 that he turned his attention to Stonehenge. Thom chose to ignore alignments between features within the monument, considering them to be too close together to be reliable. He looked for landscape features that could have marked lunar and solar events. However, one of Thom's key sites – Peter's Mound – turned out to be a twentieth-century rubbish dump.

== Later theories ==
An observation published in 2017 notes that the mean average diameter of the moon and the Earth might be drawn in the diameters of the stone and Earth circles at Stonehenge. Though this overlap could be coincidental, the same ratio between the size of the moon and the Earth is also seen in the size of the Earthwork at Stonehenge and the nearby circle at Durrington Walls.

Although Stonehenge has become an increasingly popular destination during the summer solstice, with 20,000 people visiting in 2005, scholars have developed growing evidence that indicates prehistoric people visited the site only during the winter solstice. The only megalithic monuments in the British Isles to contain a clear, compelling solar alignment are Newgrange and Maeshowe, which both face the winter solstice sunrise.

The most recent evidence supporting the theory of winter visits includes bones and teeth from pigs which were slaughtered at nearby Durrington Walls, their age at death indicating that they were slaughtered either in December or January every year. Mike Parker Pearson of the University of Sheffield has said in 2005, "We have no evidence that anyone was in the landscape in summer." Later on, in light of more recent research and findings, Mike Pearson reconsidered arguing that it is "reasonable to assume that they came to celebrate the midsummer solstice as well as the midwinter solstice".

== See also ==
- List of archaeoastronomical sites sorted by country
