= William Hawley =

British archaeologist (1851–1941)

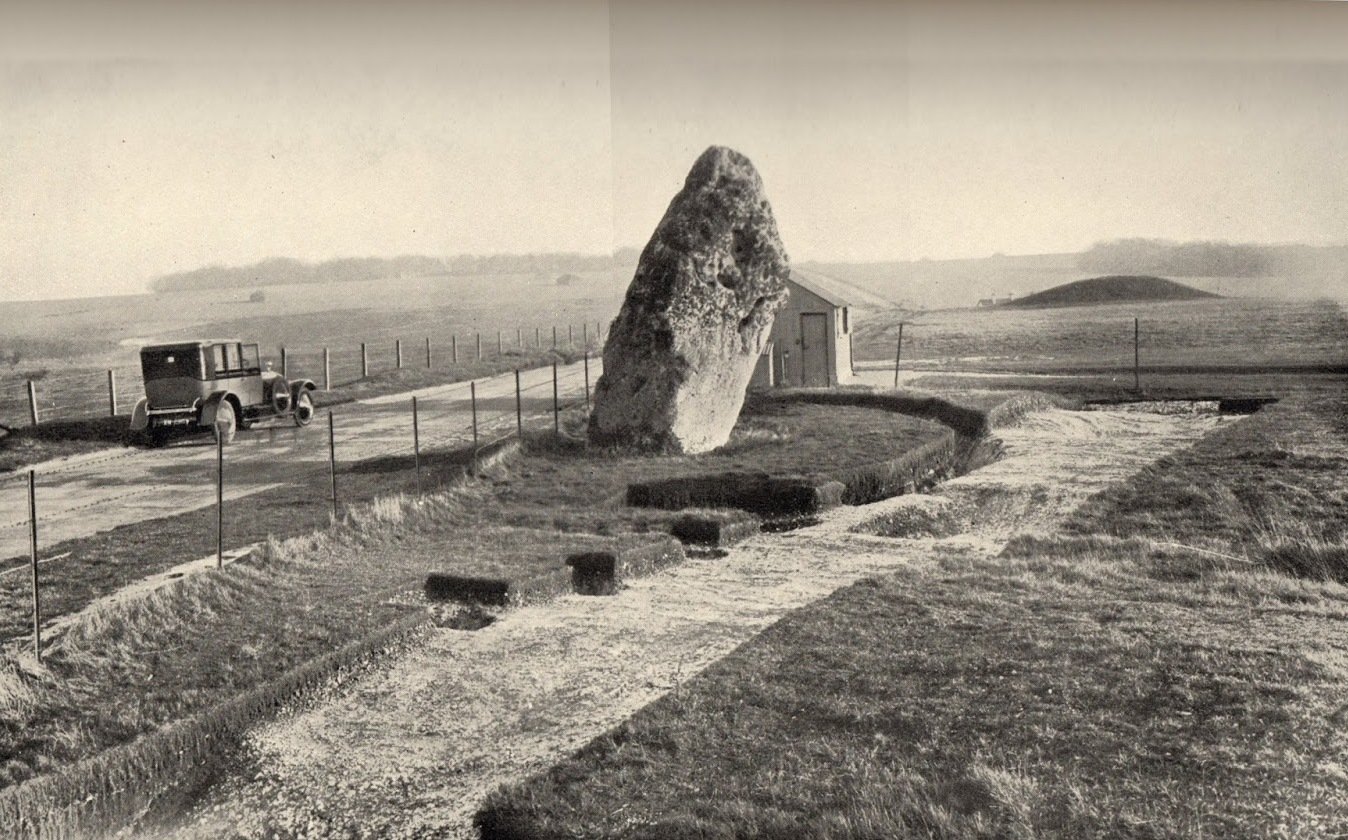
Excavations near the Heelstone (The Antiquaries Journal, 1925)

Lieutenant colonel William Hawley (1851–1941) was a British archaeologist who undertook pioneering excavations at Stonehenge.

== Military career ==
Hawley joined the Royal Engineers and was a captain of the Portsmouth division of the Royal Engineers Militia from March 1893. In late March 1902, he was seconded for active service in South Africa for the later stages of the Second Boer War, and after the end of this war he was back with his regiment from October 1902.

== Old Sarum ==
Along with William Henry St John Hope and Duncan Hector Montgomerie, Hawley participated in the first major excavations of the Old Sarum hillfort between 1909 and 1915. These digs were organized by the Society of Antiquaries of London.

== Stonehenge ==
Work at the Stonehenge prehistoric monument was carried out between 1919 and 1926, largely by Hawley alone, at times assisted by Robert Newall, a draughtsman from the Office of Works. The weather and the confusing stratigraphy of this site made work difficult, but Hawley was able to make numerous breakthroughs regarding the history of activity on the site.

The first task was the supervised righting of some of the fallen stones, late in 1919. Hawley dug out the foundations before the stones were replaced. Hawley was employed by the Office of Works, the antecedent of the Ministry of Works who had been passed responsibility for Stonehenge when it had been donated to the nation in 1918. They were primarily concerned with the danger of falling stones, but funds were made available for Hawley to continue his investigations long after the righting work was finished.

Hawley identified the Aubrey Holes for the first time, as well as the Y and Z Holes and a variety of other postholes and stone holes within the centre of the monument. He found many of the cremated and uncremated human remains which first indicated a funerary role for Stonehenge. Excavations of the Avenue, the ditch (Heelstone Ditch) around the Heelstone, and the trench (Arc Trench) leading up to the Heelstone were also undertaken.

Hawley proved, from a thin stratum of stone chip debris he called the Stonehenge Layer, that the earthwork features, the Aubrey Holes and some of the other postholes and burials constituted earlier phases of activity that predated the erection of the megaliths. He also found an antler pick embedded in a lump of chalk, indicating the construction method on site. Eventually he settled on three phases: the earthwork enclosure, a large stone circle now vanished that supposedly stood in the Aubrey Holes, and finally a larger megaliths phase involving the extant stones as Stonehenge 3. Hawley's model of a multiphase site did not agree with the contemporary interpretation and was ignored until Richard Atkinson revived the idea in the 1950s. Although later considerably refined, his multi-phase interpretation is now fully accepted.

Certain of Hawley's other ideas, such as Stonehenge being a fortified settlement, were further off the mark and he died before his work was recognised.

Artefacts excavated by Hawley at Stonehenge are displayed in the Wessex Gallery of Archaeology at the Salisbury Museum. Selected samples were also sent to the Ashmolean (Oxford), the Museum of Archaeology and Anthropology (Cambridge), the National Museum of Wales (Cardiff), and the British Museum (London).
