= Chronicle (British TV programme) =

British archaeology television series

- The Chronicle title sequence, 1989
- Genre: Documentary
- Country of origin: United Kingdom
- Original language: English
- No. of series: 25

Production
- Executive producers: Paul Johnstone (1966–1976); Bruce Norman (1977–1989)
- Editor: Bruce Norman
- Running time: 50–60 min. (regular episode)

Original release
- Network: BBC Two
- Release: 18 June 1966 – 29 May 1991

Chronicle is a British television programme that was shown monthly and then fortnightly on BBC Two from 18 June 1966 until its last broadcast on 29 May 1991. Chronicle focused on popular archaeology and related subjects, and was considered an influential programme and a landmark in early television presentation of archaeology. The programme was commissioned by David Attenborough in 1966, and was produced by the Archaeological and Historical Unit headed by Paul Johnstone and later edited by Bruce Norman. Among the presenters of the programme were Magnus Magnusson, Colin Renfrew, David Drew, and John Julius Norwich.

== Background ==
BBC first broadcast a regular archaeology programme on radio introduced by Glyn Daniel in 1946 titled The Archaeologist. This was followed by a popular television quiz show Animal, Vegetable, Mineral? from 1952, and Buried Treasure broadcast from 1954 to 1959. In 1966, the first controller of BBC Two, David Attenborough, thought that there was sufficient interest in archaeology and established a special unit on the subject, the Archaeological and Historical Unit, to produce Chronicle.

Attenborough intended Chronicle to report on archaeological digs and findings around the world where archaeology was shown as it was practised, and new discoveries could be presented on the show. The Archaeological and Historical Unit at the BBC that produced the programme was headed by Paul Johnstone. Later the show was edited by Bruce Norman. Norman described Chronicle as a "show" because they were "in the entertainment business – not the archaeology business", with the aim to "inform and educate the viewing public in as entertaining a way as possible".

The show had many different writers, presenters and narrators. One of the earliest was Magnus Magnusson who wrote and presented the programme for a number of years from 1966 on. Other presenters included the archaeologists Glyn Daniel, Colin Renfrew, Mortimer Wheeler and David Drew, and the historian John Julius Norwich. The programme ended in 1991 after the death of its editor Bruce Norman.

The programme is a mix of full-length documentaries and some live broadcasts. It financed projects that they filmed and televised, the first of which was a live broadcast of an excavation on a prehistoric mound, Silbury Hill, undertaken by Richard Atkinson in 1968. However, this excavation as well as those at South Cadbury conducted by Leslie Alcock yielded few results. Later investigations funded include the post-mortem examination of Tutankhamun.

Other notable episodes aired included the excavations at Knossos and Sutton Hoo, and it was part of the 16-hour live coverage of the raising of Mary Rose from the Solent. Most of the subjects were on ancient civilisations, with some on biographies, philosophy and various other aspects of archaeology such as industrial, underwater and amateur archaeology.

The programmes were initially broadcast monthly. It became the primary outlet for archaeology documentaries on British television for many years, although later other documentaries were also produced, for example occasional series such as In Search of the Dark Ages by Michael Wood in 1981, and Romer's Egypt by John Romer in 1982, in particular the history-based Timewatch launched in 1982. A selection of excerpts and full programmes are available at the BBC archive website.

== Reception ==
=== Critical ===
After a shaky start, the programme went on to produce a series of high quality documentaries and it was considered a high point of British documentary. However, it attracted some criticism for sensationalising some of the subjects, for example in the three episodes by Henry Lincoln on the Rennes-le-Château "mystery" and Knights Templar conspiracy theory broadcast in 1972, 1974, and 1979. The conspiracy theory was further expounded in The Holy Blood and the Holy Grail and later became the inspiration for Dan Brown's novel The Da Vinci Code.

It was also criticised for its "soft-centered approach" on such subjects as the Mary Rose. It was claimed that the dig at Silbury funded by the programme had damaged the site because it was not filled in properly after the dig.

=== Ratings ===
The show had good viewing figures for documentaries, rising from one million in 1973 to 2.5 million in 1983. Its most successful episodes were broadcast during the 16-hour coverage over three days of the raising of the Tudor warship Mary Rose in October 1982, which gained a cumulative audience of 20 million in the UK as well as other viewers in Europe.

== Episodes ==
This is an incomplete list. The programme celebrated its 100th episode in 1974, and its 200th episode was broadcast in 1984.

=== 1960s ===
No.	Title	Directed by	Written / Presented by	Original release date
1966
1	"The Vikings in North America"	Julia Cave	Glyn Daniel, Magnus Magnusson, Gwyn Jones	18 June 1966
Daniel, Magnusson and Jones discuss the evidence for possible Viking travels to North America in the wake of the 1965 publication of the Vinland Map. Magnusson examines the Flatey Book at Denmark's Royal Library.
2	"Nimrud: The Story of a Dig"	Kenneth Shepheard	—	16 July 1966
Professor Max Mallowan along with Sir Mortimer Wheeler, Dr R. D. Barnett and Gordon Waterfield present findings from the excavation of the one-time Assyrian capital city of Nimrud/Kalhu (in modern-day Iraq).
TBA	"Stonehenge: Prehistoric Computer?" / "The First European"	Julia Cave / Kenneth Shepheard	—	13 August 1966
• Professor Gerald Hawkins's theory that Stonehenge was used for astronomy. • Dr. John Napier and Professor Kenneth Oakley discuss the Vértesszőlős skull, and claim it to be homo sapiens rather than homo erectus as originally believed.
TBA	"Royal Ship, Royal Palace, Royal Grave"	Julia Cave, John Irving, Paul Johnstone	—	10 September 1966
The buried ship at Sutton Hoo, the possibility of Somerset's Cadbury Castle being Camelot of Arthurian legend, and the Irish burial mound of Newgrange.
TBA	"The Invasion That Never Was ..." / "... And the Last Invasion"	Julia Cave	—	8 October 1966
• General Sir Brian Horrocks on the fictional 1875 Battle of Dorking Gap and its effect on the popular imagination. • The Norman Conquest of England as shown by the Bayeux Tapestry.
TBA	"London's Burning"	Kenneth Shepheard	—	5 November 1966
The Great Fire of London of 1666.
TBA	"The Treasure of Priam"	Julia Cave	Magnus Magnusson	3 December 1966
Heinrich Schliemann's 1873 discovery of the Treasure of Priam at Hisarlik, and its disappearance from World War II era Berlin.
TBA	"The Holy Sailors" / "The Roman Goose March"	Kenneth Shepheard	Magnus Magnusson / Glyn Daniel	31 December 1966
• The evidence for pre-Norse settlement of Iceland by Irish monks. • Ancient Rome's best geese were reputedly sourced from northern Gaul. Daniel, aided by Olympic gold medalist Ann Packer, experiments to find the daily walking pace of geese, and shows the journey to take three months.
1967
TBA	"The Finds of the Year"	Julia Cave	—	11 February 1966
Nicholas Thomas presents 9 pieces acquired by museums in 1966, with curator- and Magnusson-led interviews. Included were the Dunstable Swan Jewel, bronze cooking pots from a Butterknowle mine, carved Celtic stone heads from Yorkshire, and Iron Age boats. A five-year-old who had shared in the Fishpool Hoard was also interviewed, and treasure trove explained.
TBA	"The Other Conquest" / "The City That Vanished"	Kenneth Shepheard	—	11 March 1967
• John Julius Norwich presents the 11th century Norman conquest of southern Italy which resulted in the founding of the Kingdom of Sicily. • The intention to use the newly developed proton magnetometer to help locate the lost city of Sybaris.
TBA	"Diagnosis – A.D. 70" / "Iron Age Autopsy"	Unknown	Magnus Magnusson / —	8 April 1967
• Dr Charles Newman diagnoses illnesses of people appearing in Roman-era wood carvings, and Lady Brogan explains what they show of everyday life. • Danish bog bodies.
TBA	"The Lost Leonardos" / "The Gate of Hell"	Kenneth Shepheard	—	13 May 1967
• Charles Gibbs-Smith discusses the recently announced discovery of 700 Leonardo da Vinci drawings of mechanical inventions. • Amateur archaeologist Robert Paget's theory that a tunnel complex at Baiae was the location of the Cumaean Sibyl's entrance to Hades instead of at Lake Avernus.
TBA	"Arthur: The Peerless King"	Bruce Parsons	Magnus Magnusson	10 June 1967
Magnusson discusses the known historical facts about King Arthur, and what has been discovered from the ongoing South Cadbury excavation of Cadbury Castle, Somerset, a possible site for Camelot.
TBA	"The Claws of the Griffin" / "Dragons' Bones"	David Collison	—	8 July 1967
• The Baglioni familicides of 3 July 1500 in Perugia led by Grifonetto Baglioni. • Magnussun interviews Alan Charig on his expedition to Lesotho in search of dinosaur fossils.
TBA	"Collision Course" / "Shall the Waters Prevail?"	Julia Cave	—	5 August 1967
• Progress in the search for the wreck of HMS Association, the flagship of Admiral Sir Cloudesley Shovell, which was lost in the Scilly naval disaster of 1707. • The relocation of the Egyptian temple of Abu Simbel to preserve it from the rising Lake Nasser after the construction of the Aswan High Dam.
TBA	"121 Million Basketloads"	Peter Bale	TBA	16 September 1967
Professor Richard Atkinson and Magnus Magnusson on Silbury Hill, western Europe's largest artificial mound.
TBA	"Cast for Posterity" / "Searching for Sheba"	—	—	30 September 1967
• How the team at Sutton Hoo preserved the lines of the treasure ship. • A US team's search for evidence of the Queen of Sheba in Arabia.
TBA	"6000 Working Dives"	Claude Duthuit	—	October 1967
The first archaeological excavation of an underwater shipwreck in its entirety by George Bass at Cape Gelidonya.
TBA	"The Fall of Constantinople" / "Lepenski Vir" / "South Cadbury"	David Collison, Kenneth Shepheard	John Julius Norwich	25 November 1967
• The 1453 Fall of Constantinople when the forces of Sultan Mehmed II defeated those of Constantine XI Palaiologos and took the capital Constantinople, ending the Byzantine Empire. • The excavation of Lepenski Vir, the oldest village in Europe, located by the Danube in modern Serbia. • An update from Leslie Alcock on progress on the excavation at Cadbury Castle, Somerset.
TBA	"The Last Days of Minos"	Julia Cave	Magnus Magnusson	23 December 1967
Excavations at Knossos, Crete, and evidence of the Minoan eruption on the neighbouring island of Santorini, which may relate to the Atlantis legend.
1968
TBA	"Faces of the Moon" / "Cave Cemetery of Niah"	— / Hugh Gibb	Lucy Goodison / —	20 January 1968
• Pottery of a pre-Incan people in the Perivian Andes (photographed by Jean-Christian Spahni). • The 40,000-year human history of the Niah Caves in Malaysian Borneo.
TBA	"Finders and Keepers"	Julia Cave	—	17 February 1968
Nicholas Thomas introduces the best finds/acquisitions of 1967. Magnusson and journalist Patricia Connor interview the relevant archaeologists and museums staff.
TBA	"The Death of the High King"	David CollisonRoderick Graham	Richard Imison, Maurice Denham, Magnus Magnusson	23 March 1968
A dramatised reconstruction of what may have been the life of a single person responsible for driving the design and construction of Stonehenge.
TBA	"The Silbury Dig" / "The Man Who Was Given a Gasworks"	David Collison, Ray Sutcliffe	Magnus Magnusson	20 April 1968
• Chronicle's first live broadcast from the excavation at Silbury Hill, less than a fortnight after it started • The ongoing development of the Beamish open air museum in County Durham by Frank Atkinson.
TBA	"The Tomb Robbers"	Unknown	Paul Johnstone	11 May 1968
Two Italians illegally raid Etruscan tombs in Vulci for antiquities.
TBA	"Sarajevo 1914" / "The Biggest Roman Handshake"	Kenneth Shepheard / David Collison	Stuart Hood / Magnus Magnusson	1 June 1968
• The June 1914 assassination of Archduke Franz Ferdinand of Austria and his wife Sophie, Duchess of Hohenberg, which resulted in the First World War; filmed in Sarajevo. • The public opening of the Fishbourne Roman Palace museum, built in 75 CE as what is believed to have been a gift from the Romans to a local client king.
TBA	"The Shrine of the Bulls"	Julia Cave	—	29 June 1968
Patricia Connor interviews James Mellaart about his excavation of the Stone Age town of Çatalhöyük in Turkey, and the conclusions he has drawn on the life, religion and culture of its people, from evidence including an 8000 year old painting of bull baiting.
TBA	"The Heart of the Mound"	David Collison	Magnus Magnusson	27 July 1968
Professor Richard Atkinson and mining engineer Dr John Taylor follow the uncovered 1849 tunnel to the center of Silbury Hill, finding its core to be layered in construction.
TBA	"This is the Wonderful Year"	Lucy Goodison	—	24 August 1968
Sabbati Zevi, a rabbi from the Ottoman Empire, who claimed to be the Jewish Messiah in 1666.
TBA	"Abu Simbel Reborn"	Julia Cave	Magnus Magnusson	21 September 1968
The relocation of the Egyptian temple of Abu Simbel, to be reopened on the following day. Filmed onsite.
TBA	"The Legend of the Borgias" / "The High Roman Style"	Unknown	Michael Adams / Stuart Hood	19 October 1968
• Pope Alexander VI and his children Caesar and Lucrezia Borgia, filmed on location. • 18th century Scottish architect Robert Adam and the inspiration he drew from Diocletian's Palace in modern Split, Croatia.
TBA	"Human Sacrifice" / "The Ghost Ship"	Unknown	— / Magnus Magnusson	16 November 1968
• The first evidence of human sacrifice by Vikings on the Orkney Islands. • The casting of the ninety-foot Sutton Hoo treasure ship from "rivets and stains in the sand".
TBA	"Bring in the Big Hammer"	Martin Minns	Martin Minns	14 December 1968
Attempts to preserve some of Britain's Industrial Revolution heritage
1969
TBA	"Carved for the Gods"	David Collison	—	11 January 1969
Carvings on Stone Age tombs are interpreted by Patrick Carey (in a short film Mists of Time on Irish megaliths and related mythology) and artist Peter Rawstorne (who exhibits tracings of petroglyphs).
TBA	"The Realms of Gold"	Kenneth Shepheard	John Julius Norwich	8 February 1969
The 1519 Spanish conquest of the Aztec Empire by Hernán Cortés (believed by Aztec emperor Montezuma to be the god Quetzalcoatl) and his 400 conquistadors, leading to the founding of Mexico.
TBA	"Thomas Becket"	Unknown	Nesta Pain	1 March 1969
A dramatised documentary on Thomas Becket as Archbishop of Canterbury, his conflicts with Henry II, and his murder by four of Henry's knights in Canterbury Cathedral in December 1170 CE.
TBA	"Lord Elgin and the Parthenon"	Unknown	TBA	29 March 1969
Thomas Bruce, 7th Earl of Elgin, his acquisition of marble sculptures and friezes from the Parthenon and other buildings on the Acropolis in Athens, and the debate over whether these "Elgin Marbles" should be returned to Greece.
TBA	"Blood-Axe's Revenge"	Per Simmonaes	TBA	19 April 1969
Life in the Viking Age as illustrated through the life of Egill Skallagrímsson, a warrior-poet who feuded with Norwegian king Erik Bloodaxe.
TBA	"No Ordinary Monk"	David Collison	Arthur Calder-Marshall	24 May 1969
The life of Joseph Leycester Lyne, known as "Ignatius the Monk", who attempted to introduce a Benedictine monastic order to the Church of England during the Victorian era.
TBA	"Silbury 1969"	David Collison	Magnus Magnussson	19 July 1969
Live broadcast from Silbury Hill.
TBA	"Silbury '69"	Unknown	TBA	16 August 1969
The last three weeks of excavations of 1969 at Silbury, including a pit near the centre of the inner mound, and the results from two years' research.
TBA	"The Fate of the Armada"	Ray Sutcliffe	—	13 September 1969
Robert Sténuit's discovery of the Girona, a galleass of the Spanish Armada, which was lost in 1588 off the coast of County Antrim, Ireland.
TBA	"There is no Conqueror...."	Unknown	Michael Adams	11 October 1969
Muslim rule in mainland Europe from AD 711, the Emirate of Granada and its Alhambra Palace, and the 1492 surrender to the Christian forces of Castile to finalise the Reconquista.
TBA	"The 100 Days"	Kenneth Shepheard	John Julius Norwich	15 November 1969
Napoleon Bonaparte's return from exile on Elba to establish his government in Paris, France, during the "Hundred Days" (111-day period) between 20 March 1815 and 8 July 1815, including the loss in the Waterloo campaign, and his abdication.
TBA	"The Treasures from the Sacred Well"	David Collison	—	20 December 1969
A Birmingham City Museum exhibition of objects retrieved from the (sacrificial) Sacred Well in the Mayan city of Chichen Itza on the Yucatán Peninsula in Mexico.

=== 1970s ===
No.	Title	Directed by	Written / Presented / Narrated by	Original release date
1970
TBA	"The Mad King?"	Unknown	TBA	17 January 1970
Historian J. Steven Watson on the madness of King George III of the United Kingdom, with diagnosis from Dr Richard Hunter, a specialist in psychological medicine.
TBA	"Search and Discovery"	Unknown	TBA	21 February 1970
Magnusson introduces the major excavations and research of the year: • Patricia Connor on the statue menhirs of horned weapon-bearing men from the Torreans on the Mediterranean island Corsica. • Professor Gerald Hawkins on the Nazca Lines in the Peruvian desert. • Film of rock paintings from the Hoggar Massif in the Sahara desert of southern Algeria. • The continuing search for Camelot in Somerset. • Evidence of early human habitation in Britain from (what is now) the Swanscombe Heritage Park in Kent.
TBA	"Tutankhamen Post-mortem"	Unknown	TBA	28 February 1970
A team led by Liverpool anatomy professor R.G. Harrison opens the coffin of the young Egyptian king Tutankhamen for the first time since 1926, and conducts a scientific X-ray study of his mummy.
TBA	"Win a Second-hand Crane"	Unknown	TBA	14 March 1970
A Chronicle competition which judges the best work by a group in researching, recording, and/or restoring part of Britain's industrial heritage.
TBA	"The Catacombs of Sakkara"	Unknown	TBA	11 April 1970
Walter Emery's search for the tomb of Imhotep, the architect responsible for Egypt's first Pyramid, at the necropolis of Sakkara, and the discovery of the burial catacombs where the Isis cow mothers of sacred Apis bulls were interred.
TBA	"One people between the Alps and the Sea!"	Unknown	TBA	16 May 1970
The "Risorgimento" movement to unify the Italians states by Giuseppe Garibaldi, Giuseppe Mazzini, Count Cavour and others, and those who resisted including Ferdinand II of the Two Sicilies.
TBA	"The Great Iron Ship"	Ray Sutcliffe	Richard Wade (writer) Dudley Foster (narration)	13 June 1970
Isambard Kingdom Brunel's 1843 SS Great Britain, the first iron-hulled steamship with a screw propeller, her working life, and her recovery in 1970 from the Falkland Islands, where she had been scuttled in 1937, for return to Bristol.
TBA	"The Great Britain Comes Home"	Ray Sutcliffe (film), David Collison (outside broadcast)	TBA	19 July 1970
Magnusson introduces the rescue and return of the SS Great Britain to Bristol, with live footage from the piloting of the ship up the River Avon into the Jeffries dry dock in Bristol Harbour 127 years to the day since she was launched there.
TBA	"The Alexandrians"	Lucy Goodison	Lucy Goodison (writer)	25 July 1970
The poetry of the third century BC Alexandrian school in the cosmopolitan city of Alexandria, Egypt, and its influence on modern authors such as Oscar Wilde, Lawrence Durrell, and Cavafy
TBA	"The Oldest Monarchy"	Unknown	TBA	15 August 1970
The almost 2500 years of monarchy in Persia/Iran, the former capital of Isfahan, and the first film of the Imam Reza shrine in Meshed.
TBA	"Atatürk – Father of the Turks"	Unknown	TBA	5 September 1970
The rise of Mustafa Kemal Atatürk with victories in the Gallipoli Campaign and the Turkish War of Independence, the abolishment of the Ottoman Empire and Caliphate, and the establishment of the Republic of Turkey under his Presidency as a secular modern nation-state with a Kemalist ideology.
TBA	"Cadbury, Silbury, and the Barbarians"	Unknown	TBA	26 September 1970
• Pictures taken by an unmanned aerial vehicle of the current year's excavation of Cadbury Castle, Somerset • The engineers at Silbury Hill • An Edinburgh Festival exhibition of Celtic art • A lyre found at Sutton Hoo, which at the time was Europe's oldest identified stringed instrument.
TBA	"Marx was here"	Unknown	TBA	10 October 1970
The life and work of German philosopher and political economist Karl Marx in London, from 1850 until his death in 1888, culminating in his (unfinished) Das Kapital.
TBA	"Cracking the Stone Age Code"	David Collison	Magnus Magnusson	31 October 1970
Alexander Thom's theory of Stonehenge as used to calculate eclipses, assessments of that theory by archaeologists.
TBA	"The Coming of the Black Ships"	Unknown	TBA	21 November 1970
The 1853-54 reopening of Japan after 220 years of isolation, achieved through the gunboat diplomacy of Commodore Matthew C. Perry of the United States and his armed steamships, presented by Bernard Keeffe from the historical locations.
TBA	"Why the Armada was Beaten?"	Unknown	TBA	12 December 1970
Sydney Wignall's discovery and survey of the wreck of the Santa Maria de la Rosa, the first flagship to be found of the 1588 Spanish Armada invasion of England, including his identification of flaws in the Spanish technique for casting cannonballs as contributing to the Armada's defeat.
1971
TBA	"The Ocean Striding Sea-Bison"	Unknown	TBA	2 January 1971
TBA	"Search and Discovery"	Unknown	TBA	23 January 1971
TBA	"Where there's muck..."	David Collison	Magnus Magnusson	20 February 1971
The 1970-71 Chronicle Industrial Archaeology Competition, judged by Kenneth Hudson, Neil Cossons and Ken Hawley.
TBA	"Nefertiti and the Computer"	Unknown	Magnus Magnusson	20 March 1971
A re-evaluation of the political status of Egyptian queen Nefertiti by Ray Winfield Smith from analysis of computer-aided reconstruction of the Temple of Amenhotep IV, which her husband Akhenaten built at Karnak.
TBA	"The Wreck of an East Indiaman"	Ray Sutcliffe	Richard Wade	24 April 1971
The 1749 stranding and subsequent sinking of the Dutch East India Company ship Amsterdam on the beach at Hastings, and its recent scientific excavation.
TBA	"The Terrible Year"	Unknown	Alistair Horne (writer), Marius Goring (narrator)	5 June 1971
The September 1870 to January 1871 Siege of Paris with the city's surrender ending the Franco-Prussian War, the subsequent political instability in Paris, and the resulting March 1871 uprising and establishment of the short-lived left-wing government of the Paris Commune until May 1871.
TBA	"The Fastest Con in the West"	Unknown	TBA	19 June 1971
The mythologising and reality of the Wild West.
TBA	"Storm in the Peninsula"	Unknown	TBA	17 July 1971
A recreation of scenes from the 1808-1814 Peninsular War on the Iberian Peninsula between the French and allied armies under Napoleon Bonaparte, and those of Spain, Portugal and Britain
TBA	"Search and Discovery"	Unknown	Magnus Magnusson	21 August 1971
TBA	"Was This the Garden of Eden"	Unknown	Magnus Magnusson	11 September 1971
The search for, discovery of, and excavation of the lost civilisation of Dilmun—the location for a precursor of the Genesis myth of the Garden of Eden—on the island of Bahrain in the Persian Gulf, by Geoffrey Bibby and a Danish archaeological team.
TBA	"The Tree That Put the Clock Back"	Unknown	TBA	6 November 1971
Analysis of dendrochronological evidence from California's Bristlecone pine, the oldest of trees, shows that there may have been significant technological advances in Prehistoric Europe rather than only the Near East.
TBA	"The Ship of the Sun Gods"	Unknown	Magnus Magnusson	27 November 1971
Professor Sverre Marstrander, who believes that the boat-and-sun rock carvings used in solar rituals of the Scandinavian Bronze Age represented real ship designs, runs an experiment to build and sail an ocean-going vessel of the type displayed.
TBA	"King Bernardotte"	Unknown	Bernard Keeffe	18 December 1971
How Charles XIV John of Sweden rose from birth as French commoner Jean-Baptiste Bernadotte to become a Marshal of the Empire under Napoleon Bonaparte and then to be elected in 1810 as Sweden's Crown Prince – and why the dynasty he established, unlike that of Napoleon, might have lasted.
1972
TBA	"Front Line Archaeology"	Unknown	TBA	29 January 1972
TBA	"The Lost Treasure of Jerusalem"	Andrew Maxwell-Hyslop	Henry Lincoln	12 February 1972
First part of the Rennes-le-Château "mystery"
TBA	"Finders, Keepers and Con-men?"	Unknown	TBA	26 February 1972
TBA	"The Other Contest"	Unknown	TBA	25 March 1972
TBA	"The Steam and Iron Contest"	Unknown	TBA	13 May 1972
TBA	"Venice – the Most Serene Republic"	Unknown	John R. Hale (writer, narrator)	10 June 1972
The story of the Republic of Venice.
TBA	"The Cave Divers"	Unknown	Magnus Magnusson (introduction, writer)	11 August 1972
Within the limestone Caves of Han-sur-Lesse of the Ardennes in Belgium, human debris has accumulated for 5000 years on the bottom of the river Lesse. The finds of cave divers there are discussed with archaeologists Barry Cunliffe, Colin Renfrew and Anna Ritchie.
TBA	"Egypt, Rome and Britain"	Unknown	TBA	25 August 1972
• UNESCO's plan to move the Egyptian temples on the drowned island of Philae. • The forthcoming public opening of an area in the Roman Baths at Bath, UK that has been excavated by Barry Cunliffe. • The opening of Neptune Hall at the National Maritime Museum by Prince Philip, featuring the paddle tug Reliant.
TBA	"The Lost World of the Maya"	Unknown	Magnus Magnusson	6 October 1972
Eric Thompson on Mayan sites
TBA	"Search and Discovery"	Unknown	TBA	30 October 1972
TBA	"The Ashes of Atlantis"	Unknown	TBA	6 November 1972
1973
TBA	"The Longbow"	Roy Davies	Robert Hardy	12 February 1973
On the history of the longbow
TBA	"Flame in the North"	Unknown	Stuart Hood	5 March 1973
Story of Finland
TBA	"Sir Mortimer: Digging Up People"	Unknown	Magnus Magnusson	26 March 1973
Part one of Mortimer Wheeler interview
TBA	"Sir Mortimer: The Viceroy sent for me..."	Unknown	Magnus Magnusson	2 April 1973
Part two of Mortimer Wheeler interview
TBA	"Prize Exhibit"	Roy Davies	Magnus Magnusson	16 April 1973
Six museums vie to win the 'Museum of the Year' title.
TBA	"The Ape Man That Never Was"	Paul Jordan	Geoffrey Hinsliff	7 May 1973
On the Piltdown Man hoax
TBA	"For Love or Money?"	Antonia Benedek	Magnus Magnusson	18 June 1973
On restoration of old watermills
TBA	"The Mystery of the Etruscans"	Unknown	Bernard Keeffe	9 July 1973
Exploring the mystery of the Etruscans
TBA	"Trial and Error"	Unknown	TBA	23 July 1973
TBA	"Search and Discovery"	Unknown	TBA	14 August 1973
TBA	"The Chinese Tutankhamun"	Unknown	TBA	18 October 1973
TBA	"Islands Out of Time"	Unknown	TBA	1 November 1973
1974
TBA	"Maximilian of Mexico"	Unknown	TBA	21 March 1974
Emperor Maximilian I, and his failed 1864-1867 attempt to establish the Second Mexican Empire in place of the Second Federal Republic of Mexico.
100	"The 'Celebration' of the 100th Chronicle"	—	Magnus Magnusson	25 April 1974
A banquet is held where historians and archaeologists sample and comment on foods from the Stone Age, Ancient Egypt, and Ancient Rome.
TBA	"The Saga of Magnus Tourist-killer"	Unknown	TBA	14 May 1974
1,100 years after Iceland was first settled, Icelander Magnus Magnusson leads a group visit to illuminate its history, sagas and legends.
TBA	"True or False?"	Unknown	Magnus Magnusson	20 June 1974
• the Piltdown Man hoax • a Roman siege engine test • progress at Philae • the restoration of The Iron Bridge.
TBA	"The Ship That Never Sailed"	Unknown	TBA	25 July 1974
The Bremen cog.
TBA	"House the Picts Built"	Unknown	TBA	28 August 1974
Anna Ritchie's 1970-1 excavation of a mound at Buckquoy, Birsay in the Orkney Islands, where she found the remains of six houses built on the same site, four of which were Pictish.
TBA	"Florence – The Fifth Element"	Unknown	TBA	9 October 1974
The birth of the Renaissance in the Italian Republic of Florence, and the Medici Family's struggle to control that city-state.
TBA	"The Priest, the Painter and The Devil"	Roy Davies	Henry Lincoln	30 October 1974
Part 2 of the Rennes-le-Château "mystery"
TBA	"Inside the Great Pyramid"	Unknown	TBA	27 November 1974
Architect Hubert Paulsen's theory of an undiscovered chamber within the Great Pyramid at Giza, based on a geometric analysis.
1977
TBA	"The Key to the Land of Silence"	Anna Benson Gyles	Paul Jordan	8 March 1977
On Rosetta Stone
1978
TBA	"Aphrodite's Other Island"	—	Colin Renfrew	20 November 1978
On Phylakopi in Milos
1979
TBA	"Tomb of the Lost King"	Roy Davies	Roy Davies	20 April 1979
Tombs of Macedonia in Vergina
TBA	"Search for the Master Carpenter"	Robin Boothe	Cecil Hewett / René Cutforth	18 May 1979
On early timber buildings
TBA	"Digging from the Air"	Unknown	TBA	1 June 1979
On aerial archaeology
TBA	"Santorini – the First Pompeii"	Unknown	Magnus Magnusson	8 June 1979
On the Minoan eruption that buried Akrotiri
TBA	"Lost Kings of the Desert"	—	Colin Renfrew	30 October 1979
On the city of Hatra in Iraq
TBA	"The Shadow of the Templars"	Roy Davies	Henry Lincoln	27 November 1979
Final part of the Rennes-le-Château "mystery"

=== 1980s ===
Title	Directed by	Written / Presented by	Original release date	Notes
1980
"Black Napoleon"	Kenneth Shepheard	John Julius Norwich	23 April 1980	On Toussaint L'Ouverture
"Sacred Ring"	John Selwyn Gilbert	Aubrey Burl	21 May 1980	On stone circles
"The Wreck of the Mary Rose"	John Selwyn Gilbert	—	29 October 1980	First of eight programmes on Mary Rose
1981
"Orpheus and the Gentleman Farmer"	Antonia Benedek	Antonia Benedek	29 April 1981	
"Electric Revolution"	—	Ken Hudson	13 May 1981	On industrial archaeology
1982
"Riot"	Antonia Benedek	Simon Winchester	24 February 1982	
"The Wreck of Mary Rose, Part 2"	John Selwyn Gilbert	—	22 April 1982	Progress on the investigation
"The Wreck of Mary Rose III"	John Selwyn Gilbert	—	9 October 1982	
"Raising the Rose"	Peter Massey, John Selwyn Gilbert	—	10 October 1982	A number of live broadcasts plus highlights
"The Year They Raised the Rose"	John Selwyn Gilbert	—	24 December 1982	
1983
"Life and Death in Ancient Egypt"	John Selwyn Gilbert	John Selwyn Gilbert	29 November 1983	
1984
"Lost City of the Incas"	—	David Drew	24 January 1984	Hiram Bingham and Machu Picchu
"The Wreck in Campese Bay"	Roy Davies	Roy Davies	28 February 1984	Mensun Bound on Etruscan shipwreck
"Chronicle 200"	Unknown	TBA	17 April 1984	200th episode
"The Wreck of the Mary Rose Part IV"	John Selwyn Gilbert	—	16 May 1984	
1989
"Sutton Hoo"	Unknown	Martin Carver	16 August 1989	New digs at Sutton Hoo
"Digging for Slaves"	Unknown	David Drew	13 September 1989	Slave quarters on American plantations
"Nefertari – For Whom the Sun Shines"	Unknown	David Drew	6 December 1989	

=== 1990s ===
Title	Directed by	Written / Presented by	Original release date	Notes
1991
"Memphis : capital of Egypt"	Unknown	—	29 May 1991	Last episode broadcast
