= Stonehenge in Its Landscape =

Archaeological report on Stonehenge

Stonehenge in its landscape
- Cover
- Author: R.M.J. Cleal, K.E. Walker and R. Montague
- Language: English
- Genre: Archaeology
- Publisher: English Heritage
- Publication date: 1995
- Pages: 618
- ISBN: 1-85074-605-2
- OCLC: 34051849

Stonehenge in its landscape: Twentieth century excavations by Rosamund M. J. Cleal, Karen E. Walker and Rebecca Montague is an archaeological report on Stonehenge published in 1995. It presented the results of a two-year intensive study of all the known records of the various excavations at Stonehenge in the twentieth century, including a rephasing of the development of the monument.

Unlike popular books on the subject, Stonehenge in its landscape details the complex archaeological stratigraphy of the site. It has been described as "an essential reference work for the specialist".

== Origins ==
In 1993, both the setting and the presentation of Stonehenge was described as "a national disgrace" by the House of Commons Public Accounts Committee. The criticisms were several: two major roads ran close to the monument, one of which cut the processional Avenue; a large car park lay nearby; the pedestrian access to the monument was via a shabby underpass, and the visitor facilities were very limited, with no visitor centre. In addition, there was no proper plan of the monument.

The documentation of the site was in a similarly poor state. Professor Richard J. C. Atkinson had published a partial account of the site in 1956, and this had been revised in 1979, but after nearly 90 years of archaeological investigations at the monument there was still no definitive publication presenting the complex stratigraphy and the finds recovered from the site. In 1993 English Heritage commissioned Wessex Archaeology to prepare such a volume. The work involved detailed study of all available site records, including plans, photographs, site notebooks, letters and other documentary sources, as well as analysis of all the finds from the site, and a new suite of radiocarbon dates for the monument. The volume aimed to relate the site to its local landscape.

== Contents ==
The volume is split into four parts. Part 1 deals with the geography and history of Stonehenge, including previous work at the site, and the site in its modern setting. Part 2, entitled Stonehenge, the monument in its setting tackles the Mesolithic and earlier Neolithic evidence from the site, and then moves on to describe the development of the monument, including the three major phases of development, and the post-Bronze Age use of the site. Part 3 deals with the artefacts and ecofacts (environmental data), and Part 4 is the discussion section.

The analysis showed that Atkinson's phasing of the monument no longer held, and a new scheme was set out:

- Phase 1, c. 2950-2900 BC
  - Construction of ditch, inner bank, outer counterscarp bank
  - Construction of Aubrey Holes (interpreted as a ring of posts)
  - Primary fill accumulated in the ditch, and an organic layer over it
- Phase 2, c. 2900-2400 BC
  - Secondary ditch fill accumulated, including some deliberate backfill
  - Post settings within the earthwork from the centre towards the southern entrance; also in the northeast entrance
  - Towards the end of the phase, cremations put in the partially filled Aubrey Holes and the upper ditch, and on and just inside the inner bank
- Phase 3, c.2550-1600 BC
  - 3i: Bluestones set up in the Q and R Holes and then dismantled
  - 3ii: Construction of the sarsen circle and the trilithons. Possibly coeval with 3iii
  - 3iii: Construction of another bluestone setting which included bluestone trilithons. Possibly coeval with 3ii
  - 3iv: Rearranged bluestones then set in a circle and oval
  - 3v: The oval later rearranged to form a bluestone horseshoe
  - 3vi: Digging of Y and Z Holes to take stones (presumed bluestones) but these were left unfilled

The Avenue was also constructed during Phase 3.

== Publication ==
The book was launched at the Society of Antiquaries in London on 5 October 1995. One reviewer wryly noted:

If this book were a new car - such is its importance - it would have descended from the clouds amidst lasers, escorted by angelic supermodels. Instead, it was launched at the Society of Antiquaries with tea and biscuits. Such is the world.

Reviewers described the monograph as "a massive achievement", "fundamental" and "one of the more important British archaeological publications this century". The original edition had a print run of just 800 copies; the volume was reprinted in 2006.

== Bibliography ==
- Case, Humphrey, 1997, "Stonehenge Revisited" Wiltshire Archaeological and Natural History Magazine 90, 161-168
- Chippindale, Christopher, 1995, Editorial in Antiquity 69, 863-865
- Cleal, R. M. J., Walker, K. E. and Montague, R., 1995, Stonehenge in its landscape: Twentieth century excavations English Heritage Archaeological Report 10
- North, John, 1996, From Stonehenge: Neolithic Man and the Cosmos Harper Collins
- Pitts, Mike, 1996, "This century at Stonehenge (at last)" British Archaeology 52, 12
- Whittle, Alasdair, 1996, "Eternal stones: Stonehenge completed" Antiquity 70, 463-5
