= Heelstone Ditch =

Geographical feature

Coordinates: 51.178858°N 1.833772°W

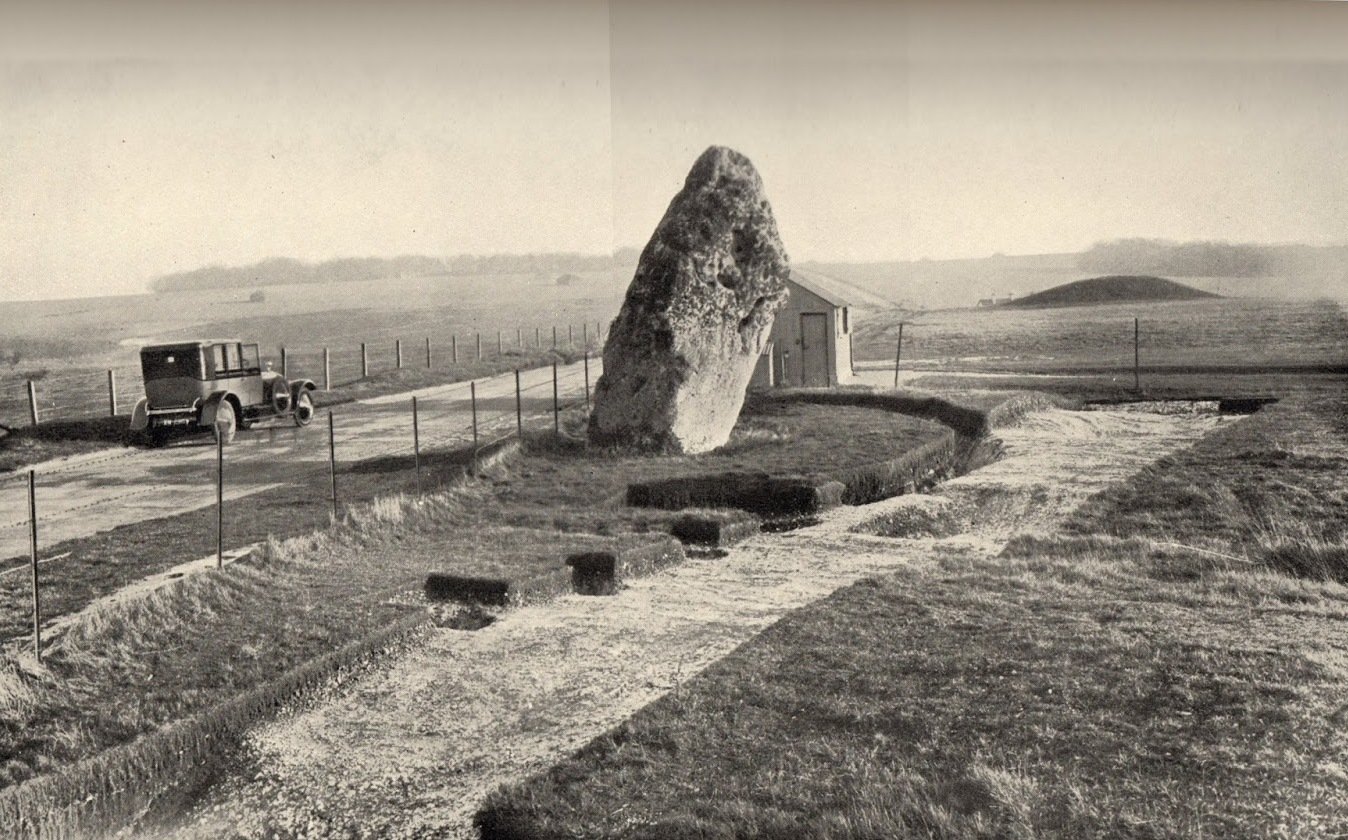
1923 Excavation of Heelstone Ditch

Heelstone Ditch is a roughly circular feature surrounding the Heel Stone at Stonehenge. It is not known if there was an intended relationship between the ditch and the heelstone although it is likely that the stone was in place either before or at the same time as the ditch. It has steep sloping sides which end at a narrow flat base, and is approximately 4 ft (1.2m) deep and 3.5 ft (1.1m) wide. It is some 12 ft (3.7m) from base the base of the Heelstone, with a diameter of roughly 32 ft (9.7m). A broad arcing trench found in 1923 by Lt-Col William Hawley 9 ft (2.7m) wide cuts this ditch from the West, deepening towards the stone. Against the Heelstone Ditch (inside circle) is rammed chalk filled Stonehole 97, whose missing stone is known as Heelstone's twin although it is possible that the stone in Stonehole 97 was moved and is now the stone known as the Heelstone. The ditch was probably dug after the stone in Stonehole 97 was moved but possibly before that.

Only a small part of the Heelstone Ditch, immediately behind the Highways Agency A344 roadside fence, now remains unexplored or undisturbed. General nature of the ditch and fill described in 1979 by Michael W. Pitts, et al. , compares well with Hawley's (1923, 1925).
