= Gerald Hawkins =

British astronomer

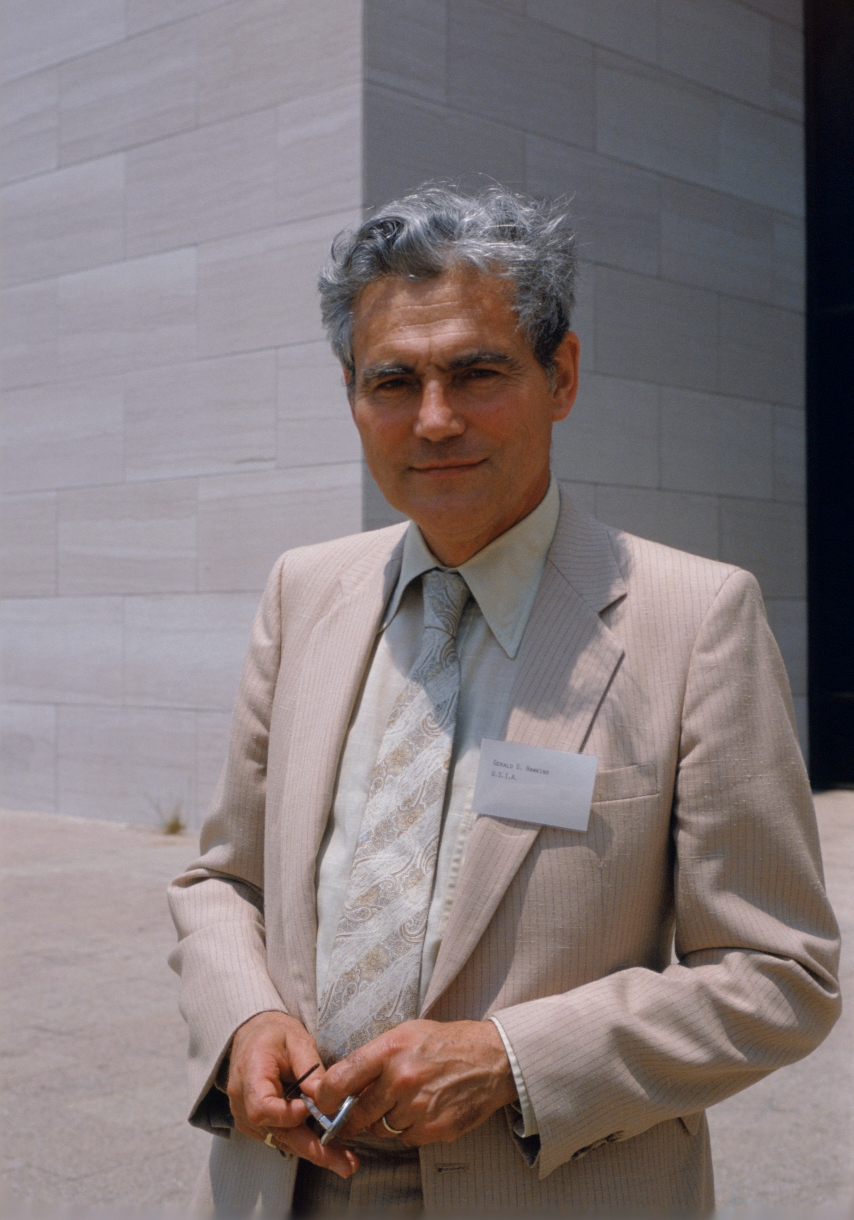
- Hawkins in 1984
- Born: Gerald Stanley Hawkins; 20 April 1928; Great Yarmouth, England
- Died: 26 May 2003 (aged 75); Woodville, Virginia, United States
- Occupation: Astronomer
- Employer: Boston University
- Known for: Stonehenge Decoded
- Title: Professor

Gerald Stanley Hawkins (20 April 1928– 26 May 2003) was a British-born American astronomer and author noted for his work in the field of archaeoastronomy. A professor and chair of the astronomy department at Boston University in the United States, he published in 1963 an analysis of Stonehenge in which he was the first to propose that it was an ancient astronomical observatory used to predict movements of the sun and moon, and that it was used as a computer. Archaeologists and other scholars have since demonstrated such sophisticated, complex planning and construction at other prehistoric earthwork sites, such as Cahokia in the U.S.

== Early life and education ==
Gerald Hawkins was born in Great Yarmouth, England, and studied physics and mathematics at the University of Nottingham. In 1952, he took a PhD in radio astronomy, studying under Sir Bernard Lovell at the University of Manchester.

== Career ==
In 1957, Hawkins became professor of astronomy and chairman of the department at Boston University in the United States. He wrote widely on numerous subjects, including tektites, meteors and the steady-state universe theory. He became an American citizen in 1965.

=== Splendor in the Sky (1961) ===
Hawkins' first book, Splendor in the Sky, is a detailed overview of astronomy. It includes a conventional overview of the history of the field and discusses topics of interest such as the formation and evolution of the Solar System as well as the properties of distant galaxies. However, he dismisses the expansion of the universe from the Big Bang as a false notion, despite the evidence compelling science "to adopt the expanding solution at the present epoch". His dismissal of the Big Bang was based on an alleged lack of "remnants left behind at the seat of the explosion [at the] center of the universe". The cosmic microwave background, which fills space with no preference as to a center, was discovered in 1965 and provided strong evidence for the Big Bang model.

Hawkins acknowledges the age of Earth (over 4 billion years old) and the truth of Darwinism, and suggests the poetic compatibility of religious creation myths with cosmology. However, he also refers to the mythological Genesis flood narrative as a historical event that "probably dates back to 4000 B.C." and suggests that a meteorite was sent by God to destroy the biblical cities of Sodom and Gomorrah. He mentions the possible astronomical nature of Stonehenge, an idea he developed into a number of subsequent works.

=== Stonehenge Decoded (1965) ===
Hawkins applied the technological resources of the university to studying the astronomical alignments of ancient megalithic sites. He fed the positions of standing stones and other features at Stonehenge into an early IBM 7090 computer and used the mainframe to model sun and moon movements. In his 1965 book, Stonehenge Decoded (with John B. White), Hawkins argued that the various features at the monument were arranged in such a way as to predict a variety of astronomical events.

By interpreting Stonehenge as a giant prehistoric observatory and computer, Hawkins' work re-assessed what had previously been seen as a primitive temple. The archaeological community was sceptical and his theories were criticized by such noted historians as Richard Atkinson, who denounced the book as being "tendentious, arrogant, slipshod, and unconvincing".

Stonehenge Decoded sold widely. It was especially popular among the members of 1960s counterculture, who found that it followed a similar "wisdom of the ancients" line explored by Alexander Thom. Hawkins' theories still inform popular opinion of Stonehenge. Although some archaeologists are cautious to accept Hawkins' theories, many archaeoastronomers have built upon his work. Many scholars accept that the importance of astronomical alignment and large complexes being planned and constructed to fulfill cosmology has been demonstrated at other prehistoric sites, such as the Snake Mound and Cahokia in the U.S.

Hawkins appeared as himself on the June 21, 1965 episode of the CBS gameshow To Tell the Truth, receiving two of four possible votes.

Hawkins later examined the Nazca lines in Peru, and concluded there was not enough evidence to support an astronomical explanation for them. He also studied the temple of Amun at Karnak. He continued to study Stonehenge up until his death. In 1973, he published Beyond Stonehenge.

The American Astronomical Society stated in its obituary for Hawkins:

Gerald Hawkins served as Dean of Dickinson College in Carlisle, Pennsylvania, from 1969 to 1971, when his career trajectory transported him to the United States Information Agency, where he was appointed Science Advisor to the Director and where he remained until his retirement in 1989.

=== Mindsteps to the Cosmos (1983) ===
In Mindsteps to the Cosmos, he elucidated his notion of mindsteps, dramatic and irreversible changes to paradigms or worldviews. He identified five distinct mindsteps in human history, and the technology that accompanied these "new world views": the invention of imagery, writing, mathematics, printing, the telescope, rocket, radio, TV, computer... "Each one takes the collective mind closer to reality, one stage further along in its understanding of the relation of humans to the cosmos." He observed an accelerating change: "The waiting period between the mindsteps is getting shorter. One can't help noticing the acceleration." Hawkins' empirical 'mindstep equation' quantified this, and gave dates for future mindsteps. The date of the next mindstep (5; the series begins at 0) is given as 2021, with two further, successively closer mindsteps in 2045 and 2051, until the limit of the series in 2053. His speculations ventured beyond the technological:

The mindsteps... appear to have certain things in common—a new and unfolding human perspective, related inventions in the area of memes and communications, and a long formulative waiting period before the next mindstep comes along. None of the mindsteps can be said to have been truly anticipated, and most were resisted at the early stages. In looking to the future we may equally be caught unawares. We may have to grapple with the presently inconceivable, with mind-stretching discoveries and concepts.

== See also ==
- Aubrey holes
