= Alexander Thom =

Scottish engineer - Ph.D. University of Glasgow (1894–1985)

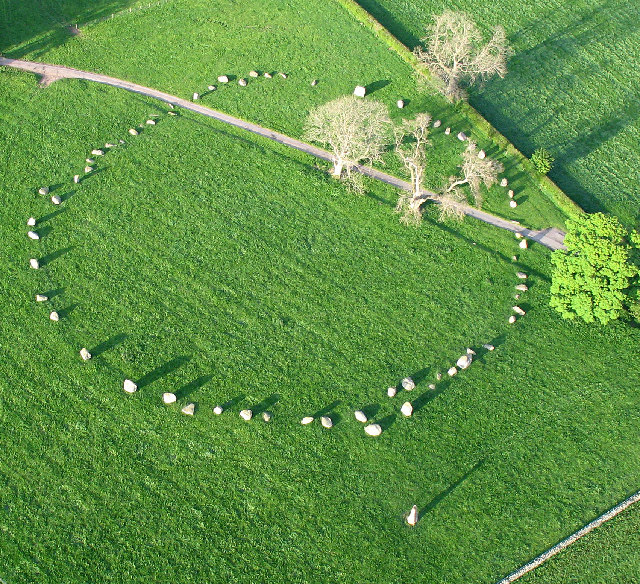
Long Meg and Her Daughters, the largest example of Alexander Thom's Type B Flattened Circle

Alexander Thom (26 March 1894 – 7 November 1985) was a Scottish engineer most famous for his theory of the Megalithic yard, categorisation of stone circles and his studies of Stonehenge and other archaeological sites.

== Life and work ==
=== Early life and education ===
Thom was born in Carradale in 1894 to Archibald Thom, a tenant farmer at Mains farm for Carradale House, and his wife Lily Stevenson Strang from the family of Robert Louis Stevenson. His father trained the Church choir while his mother was pianist.

Thom spent his early years at Mains farm until moving to The Hill farm at Dunlop, Ayrshire. Instilled with a good work ethic by his father, Thom taught himself industrial engineering and entered college in Glasgow in 1911 where he studied alongside John Logie Baird. In 1912 he attended summer school at Loch Eck where he was trained in surveying and field astronomy by Dr David Clark and Professor Moncur. In 1913, aged just 19, he assisted in surveying the Canadian Pacific Rail Network.

Thom graduated from the Royal College of Science and Technology and the University of Glasgow in 1914, earning a BSc with special distinction in Engineering.

=== Early academic career ===
He suffered from a heart murmur and was not drafted during the First World War. Instead he went to work in civil engineering of the Forth Bridge and later designed flying boats for the Gosport Aircraft Company. In 1917 he married Jeanie Kirkwood with whom he shared a long and lively marriage.

He returned to the University of Glasgow and worked as a lecturer from 1922 to 1939, quickly earning his PhD and DSc degrees. He built his own home called Thalassa in 1922, along with a windmill to power it with electricity. His father died in 1924 and he took over running the farm where he fathered three children, Archibald, Beryl and Alan. Thom helped to develop the Department of Aeronautics at the University of Glasgow and lectured on statistics, practical field surveying, theodolite design and astronomy. From 1930 to 1935 he was a Carnegie Teaching Fellow.

During the Second World War, Thom moved to Fleet in Hampshire where he was appointed Principal Scientific Officer heading the Royal Aircraft Establishment team that developed the first high speed wind tunnel.

=== Ancient engineering and the Megalithic yard ===
Later, he was professor and chair of engineering science at Brasenose College, University of Oxford where he became interested in the methods that prehistoric peoples used to build megalithic monuments. Thom became especially interested in the stone circles of the British Isles and France and their astronomical associations.

Thom (1955) in which he first suggested the megalithic yard as a standardised prehistoric measurement. He retired from academia in 1961 to spend the rest of his life devoted to this area of research. The Thom Building, housing the Department of Engineering Science at Oxford, built in the 1960s, is named after Alexander Thom.

From around 1933 to 1977 Thom spent most of his weekends and holiday periods hefting theodolites and survey equipment around the countryside with his family member or friends, most notably with his son Archie. From studies measuring and analysing the data created at over five hundred megalithic sites, he attempted to classify stone circles into different morphological types, Type A, Type B, Type B modified, and Type D flattened circles, Type 1 and Type 2 eggs, ovals and true circles.

His son Alan died in a plane crash in 1945.

=== Archaeoastronomical speculations ===
He suggested several were built as astronomical complexes to predict eclipses via nineteen-year cycles. Thom went on to identify numerous solar and stellar alignments at stone circles, providing the foundations for the scientific discipline of archaeoastronomy.

He further suggested the prehistoric peoples of Britain must have used a solar method of keeping calendar. Based on statistical histograms of observed declinations at horizon marks with no convenient star at −22°, +8°, +9° and +22° (except possibly Spica at +9°) between 2100 and 1600 BCE, he suggested a year based on sixteen months; four with twenty two days, eleven with twenty three days, and one with twenty four.

Thom's suggested megalithic solar year was divided by midsummer, midwinter, and the two equinoxes into four and then subdivided into eight by early versions of the modern Christian festivals of Whitsun, Lammas, Martinmas, and Candlemas (see Scottish Quarter Days). He found little evidence for further subdivision into thirty two, but noted "We do not know how sophisticated prehistoric man's calendar was, but the interesting thing is that he obtained declinations very close to those we have obtained as ideal".

Thom explored these topics further in his later books

- Megalithic Sites in Britain (Oxford, 1967)
- Megalithic Lunar Observatories (Oxford, 1971)
- Megalithic Remains in Britain and Brittany (Oxford, 1978)

The last was written with his son Archie, after they carried out a detailed survey of the Carnac stones from 1970 to 1974.

Thom's ideas met with resistance from the archaeological community but were welcomed amongst elements of 1960s counter-culture. Along with Gerald Hawkins' new interpretation of Stonehenge as an astronomical 'computer' (see Archaeoastronomy and Stonehenge), Thom's theories were adopted by numerous enthusiasts for 'the lost wisdom of the ancients' and became commonly associated with pseudoscience.

=== Later life ===
In 1975, his wife, Jeanie died. In 1981 he underwent an eye operation and in 1982 he broke a femur falling on ice. He continued to write papers and undertook interviews and correspondence using a dictaphone with the assistance of audio typist, Hilda Gustin. He moved in with his daughter Beryl in 1983 in Banavie. Registered as blind, he concluded a final book Stone Rows and Standing Stones, a 557 page tome published posthumously with the assistance of Aubrey Burl in 1990. Thom died on 7 November 1985 at Fort William hospital, aged 91. His body was buried near Ayr.

Alexander Thom is survived by his daughter Beryl Austin, and his grandchildren. His son Archie survived him, but died ten years later, in 1995, from a brain tumour.

== BBC Chronicle – Cracking the Stone Age code ==
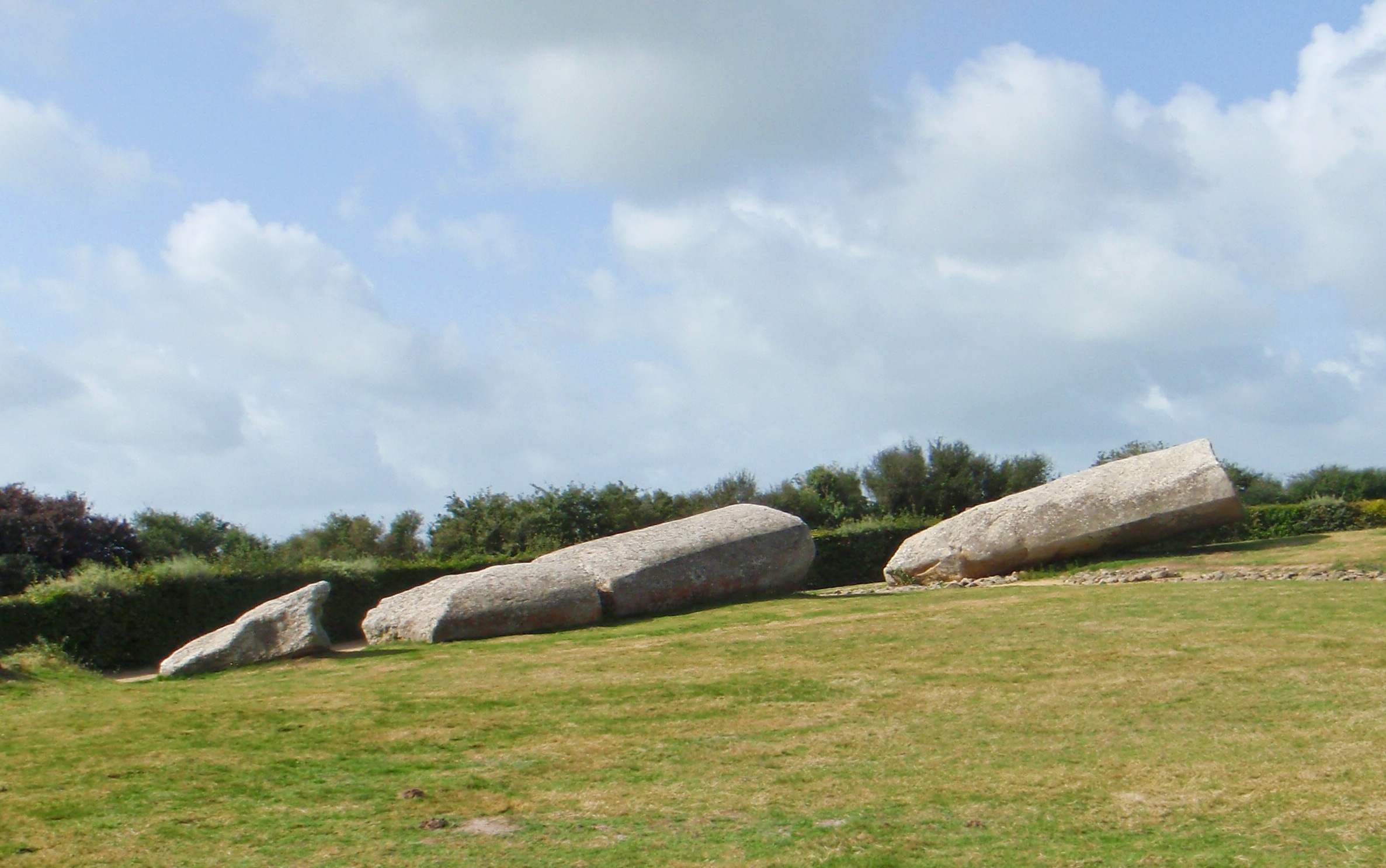
The Locmariaquer megaliths in Brittany in France, suggested by Thom to have been once used for major lunar alignments in the BBC's Chronicle – Cracking the Stone Age code

In 1970, Thom appeared on a television documentary produced by the BBC Chronicle series, presented by Magnus Magnusson and featuring well-known archaeologists Dr Euan Mackie, Professor Richard J. C. Atkinson, Dr A. H. A. Hogg, Professor Stuart Piggott, Dr Jacquetta Hawkes, Dr Humphrey Case and Dr Glyn Daniel. The programme discussed the difference between orthodox archaeology and the radical ideas of Thom. A pinnacle of his career, Thom finally got to publicly deliver his message on national television. Despite the heavy criticism, he never vented his frustration on the archaeological profession; as he said in the Chronicle programme, "I just keep reporting what I find."

== Later use of his work ==
Thom's proposed length for the Megalithic yard has been reused as such in several controversial books that claim this unit of measurement is a subdivision of the Earth's circumference in an alleged 366-degree geometry. One such book is 'Civilization One: The World is Not as You Thought It Was', by Christopher Knight and Alan Butler who propose the 366 geometry theory.

Clive Ruggles has said that both classical and Bayesian statistical reassessments of Thom's data "reached the conclusion that the evidence in favour of the MY was at best marginal, and that even if it does exist the uncertainty in our knowledge of its value is of the order of centimetres, far greater than the 1mm precision claimed by Thom. In other words, the evidence presented by Thom could be adequately explained by, say, monuments being set out by pacing, with the 'unit' reflecting an average length of pace." David George Kendall had previously argued that pacing would have created a greater difference in measurements between sites, he concluded after investigation for the Royal Academy, that "The hypothesis of a smooth, non-quantal distribution of circle diameters (for Scottish, English and Welsh true circles) is thus rejected at the 1% level."

Douglas Heggie casts doubt on Thom's suggestion as well, stating that his careful analysis uncovered "little evidence for a highly accurate unit" and "little justification for the claim that a highly accurate unit was in use".

Euan MacKie, recognising that Thom's theories needed to be tested, excavated at the Kintraw standing stone site in Argyllshire in 1970 and 1971 to check whether the latter's prediction of an observation platform on the hill slope above the stone was correct. There was an artificial platform there and this apparent verification of Thom's long alignment hypothesis (Kintraw was diagnosed as an accurate winter solstice site) led him to check Thom's geometrical theories at the Cultoon stone circle in Islay, also with a positive result. MacKie therefore broadly accepted Thom's conclusions and published new prehistories of Britain.[22] In contrast a re-evaluation of Thom's fieldwork by Clive Ruggles argued that Thom's claims of high accuracy astronomy were not fully supported by the evidence.[23] Nevertheless, Thom's legacy remains strong, Krupp wrote in 1979, "Almost singlehandedly he has established the standards for archaeoastronomical fieldwork and interpretation, and his amazing results have stirred controversy during the last three decades." His influence endures and practice of statistical testing of data remains one of the methods of archaeoastronomy.

In his book Genes, Giants, Monsters and Men, Joseph P. Farrell states, "If Thom was right, the development of human civilization may have to be rewritten!" This Farrell surmises is why Thom encounters such opposition from certain groups.

In his book Rings of Stone: The Prehistoric Stone Circles of Britain and Ireland. Aubrey Burl calls the megalithic yard "a chimera, a grotesque statistical misconception."

== See also ==
- Archeoastronomy
- Euan MacKie
- Anne Macaulay

== Publications ==
Archaeoastronomical publications.

- Thom, Alexander (1955). "A Statistical Examination of the Megalithic Sites in Britain". Journal of the Royal Statistical Society, Series A. 118 (3): 275–295. doi:10.2307/2342494. JSTOR 2342494.
- Thom, Alexander (1961). "The egg-shaped standing stone rings of Britain". Archivs Internationales d'Histoire des Sciences. 14: 291–303.
- Thom, Alexander (1961). "The Geometry of Megalithic Man". The Mathematical Gazette. 45 (352): 83–93. doi:10.2307/3614618. JSTOR 3614618. S2CID 135198241.
- Thom, Alexander (1962). "The megalithic unit of length". Journal of the Royal Statistical Society, Series A. 125 (2): 243–251. doi:10.2307/2982328. JSTOR 2982328.
- Thom, Alexander (1964). "The larger unit of megalithic man". Journal of the Royal Statistical Society, Series A. 127: 527–533. doi:10.2307/2343934. JSTOR 2343934.
- Thom, Alexander (1966). "Megaliths and mathermatics". Antiquity. 40 (158): 121–128. doi:10.1017/s0003598x00032294. S2CID 164204903.
- Thom, Alexander., Megalithic sites in Britain, Clarendon Press, Oxford, 1967 ISBN 978-0198131489.
- Thom, Alexander (1968). "The metrology of cup and ring marks". Systematics. 6: 173–189.
- Thom, Alexander., Megalithic Lunar Observatories, Clarendon Press, Oxford, 1970.
- Thom, Alexander; Thom, Archibald (1971). "The astronomical significance of the large Carnac menhirs". Journal for the History of Astronomy. 2 (3): 147–160. Bibcode:1971JHA.....2..147T. doi:10.1177/002182867100200301. S2CID 126142197.
- Thom, Alexander (1972). "The Carnac alignments". Journal for the History of Astronomy. 3: 11–26. Bibcode:1972JHA.....3...11T. doi:10.1177/002182867200300103. S2CID 126201139.
- Thom, Alexander (1972). "The uses and alignments at Le Menec, Carnac". Journal for the History of Astronomy. 3: 151–164. Bibcode:1972JHA.....3..151T. doi:10.1177/002182867200300301. S2CID 126329436.
- Thom, Alexander (1973). "The Kerlescan cromlechs". Journal for the History of Astronomy. 4 (3): 169–173. Bibcode:1973JHA.....4..168T. doi:10.1177/002182867300400303. S2CID 125905110.
- Thom, Alexander (1973). "A megalithic lunar observatory in Orkney". Journal for the History of Astronomy. 4: 169–173. doi:10.1177/002182867300400203. S2CID 125682973.
- Thom, Alexander (1973). "The Astronomical Significance of the Crucuno Stone Rectangle". Current Anthropology. 14 (4): 450–454. doi:10.1086/201352. S2CID 161168263.
- Thom, Alexander (1974). "The Kermario alignments". Journal for the History of Astronomy. 5: 30–47. Bibcode:1974JHA.....5...30T. doi:10.1177/002182867400500104. S2CID 126002751.
- Thom, Alexander; Stevenson Thom, Archibald; Strang Thom, Alexander (1974). "Stonehenge". Journal for the History of Astronomy. 5 (2): 71–90. Bibcode:1974JHA.....5...71T. doi:10.1177/002182867400500201. S2CID 220911401.
- Thom, Alexander (1975). "Further work on Brogar Lunar Observatory". Journal for the History of Astronomy. 6 (2): 100–114. Bibcode:1975JHA.....6..100T. doi:10.1177/002182867500600203. S2CID 125612631.
- Thom, Alexander; Stevenson Thom, Archibald; Strang Thom, Alexander (1975). "Stonehenge as a Possible Lunar Observatory". Journal for the History of Astronomy. 6: 19–30. Bibcode:1975JHA.....6...19T. doi:10.1177/002182867500600103. S2CID 125474896.
- Thom, Alexander (1976). "Avebury volume 1: A new assessment of the geometry and metrology of the ring". Journal for the History of Astronomy. 7: 183–192. Bibcode:1976JHA.....7..183T. doi:10.1177/002182867600700303. S2CID 118646238.
- Thom, Alexander; Thom, Archibald; Foord, T.R. (1976). "Avebury volume 2: the West Kennet Avenue". Journal for the History of Astronomy. 7: 193–197. Bibcode:1976JHA.....7..193T. doi:10.1177/002182867600700304. S2CID 125596392.
- Thom, Alexander; Thom, Archibald; Gorrie, J.M. (1976). "The two megalithic lunar observatories at Carnac". Journal for the History of Astronomy. 7: 11–26. Bibcode:1976JHA.....7...11T. doi:10.1177/002182867600700102. S2CID 118773549.
- Thom, Alexander (1977). "Megalithic Astronomy". Journal of Navigation. 30: 1–14. Bibcode:1977JNav...30....1T. doi:10.1017/s0373463300043575. S2CID 262843483.
- Thom, Alexander (1977). "A Forth Lunar Foresight for the Brogar Ring". Journal for the History of Astronomy. 8: 54–55. Bibcode:1977JHA.....8...54T. doi:10.1177/002182867700800107. S2CID 125482958.
- Thom, Alexander (1978). "A reconsideration of the Lunar Sites in Britain". Journal for the History of Astronomy. 9 (3): 170–179. Bibcode:1978JHA.....9..170T. doi:10.1177/002182867800900302. S2CID 126106001.
- Thom, Alexander., Megalithic remains in Britain and Brittany, Clarendon Press, Oxford, 1978.
- Thom, Alexander (1979). "The standing stones in Argyllshire". Glasgow Archaeological Journal. vi (6): 5–10. doi:10.3366/gas.1979.6.6.5.
- Thom, Alexander (1980). "A new study of all lunar lines". Archaeoastronomy: Supplement to the Journal for the History of Astronomy. 2: 78–94. Bibcode:1980JHAS...11...78T.
- Thom, Alexander (1980). "Astronomical foresights used by Megalithic man". Archaeoastronomy: Supplement to the Journal for the History of Astronomy. 2: 78–94. Bibcode:1980JHAS...11...78T.
- Thom, Alexander, Thom Archibald Stevenson, Burl, Aubrey., Megalithic rings: plans and data for 229 monuments in Britain, British Archaeological Reports, 1980, ISBN 978-0-86054-094-6
- Thom, Alexander, Statistical and philosophical arguments for the astronomical significance of standing stones, in D.C. Heggie, Archaeoastronomy in the Old World, Cambridge University Press, 53–82, 1982.
- Thom, Alexander, Statistical and philosophical arguments for the astronomical significance of standing stones with a section on the solar calendar, in D.C. Heggie, Archaeoastronomy in the Old World, Cambridge University Press, 53–82, 1982.
- Thom, Alexander (1983). "Observations of the moon in megalithic times". Archaeoastronomy: Supplement to the Journal for the History of Astronomy. 5: 57–66.
- Thom, Alexander (1984). "The two major Megalithic observatories in Scotland". Journal for the History of Astronomy. 15 (7): 129–148. Bibcode:1984JHAS...15..129T. doi:10.1177/002182868401500706. S2CID 126232582.
- 1990. Thom, Alexander and Burl, Aubrey Stone Rows and Standing Stones: Britain, Ireland and Brittany B.A.R. 1990, ISBN 978-0-86054-708-2
