= Station Stones =

Elements of prehistoric monument of Stonehenge in Wiltshire, England

Coordinates: 51°10′44.351651″N 1°49′35.638103″W

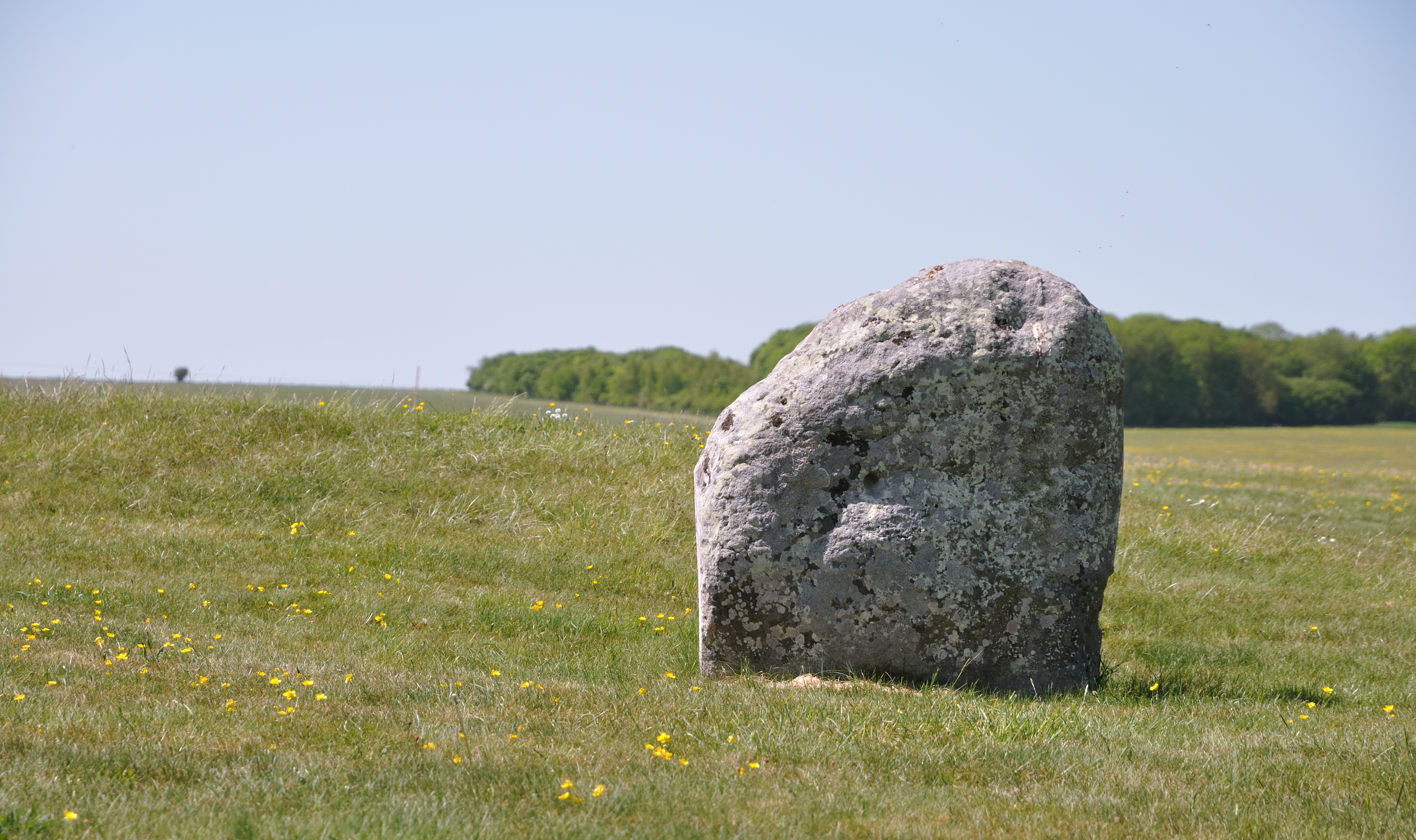
Western Station Stone 93

The Station Stones are elements of the prehistoric monument of Stonehenge.

Originally there were four stones, resembling the four corners of a rectangle that straddles the inner sarsen circle, set just inside Stonehenge's surrounding bank. Two stood on earth mounds at opposing corners, one corner broadly in the north of the site and one in the south. The mounds are called the North and South barrows although they never contained burials. The ring ditches surrounding these barrows respect the presence of Stonehenge's encircling bank indicating that they postdate this feature.

The other two corners of the rectangle are occupied by the two surviving stones which are undressed sarsens. Their installation at the monument dates to sometime in Stonehenge phase 3, perhaps around 4,000 years ago.

Various astronomical alignments have been suggested for the stones, all involving other features at the site. As they cannot be said with certainty to have been contemporaneous with other stones or posts at Stonehenge, archaeoastronomical theories regarding their function have been treated with scepticism by mainstream archaeology. Although described as forming a rectangle, the two stones and the two stone settings can also be described as representing two opposite facets of an octagon. This suggests that they were laid out to a geometric plan and challenges the theory that the positions were astronomically determined.

== Bibliography ==
- Johnson, Anthony (2008). Solving Stonehenge: The New Key to an Ancient Enigma. Thames & Hudson. ISBN 978-0500051559.
- Mike Pitts, Hengeworld, London: Arrow, 2001, ISBN 978-0-09-927875-7
- John Edwin Wood, Sun, Moon and Standing Stones. Oxford University Press, 1980, ISBN 0-19-211443-3
