= Heel Stone =

Block of sarsen stone in England

Coordinates: 51.179305°N 1.825302°W

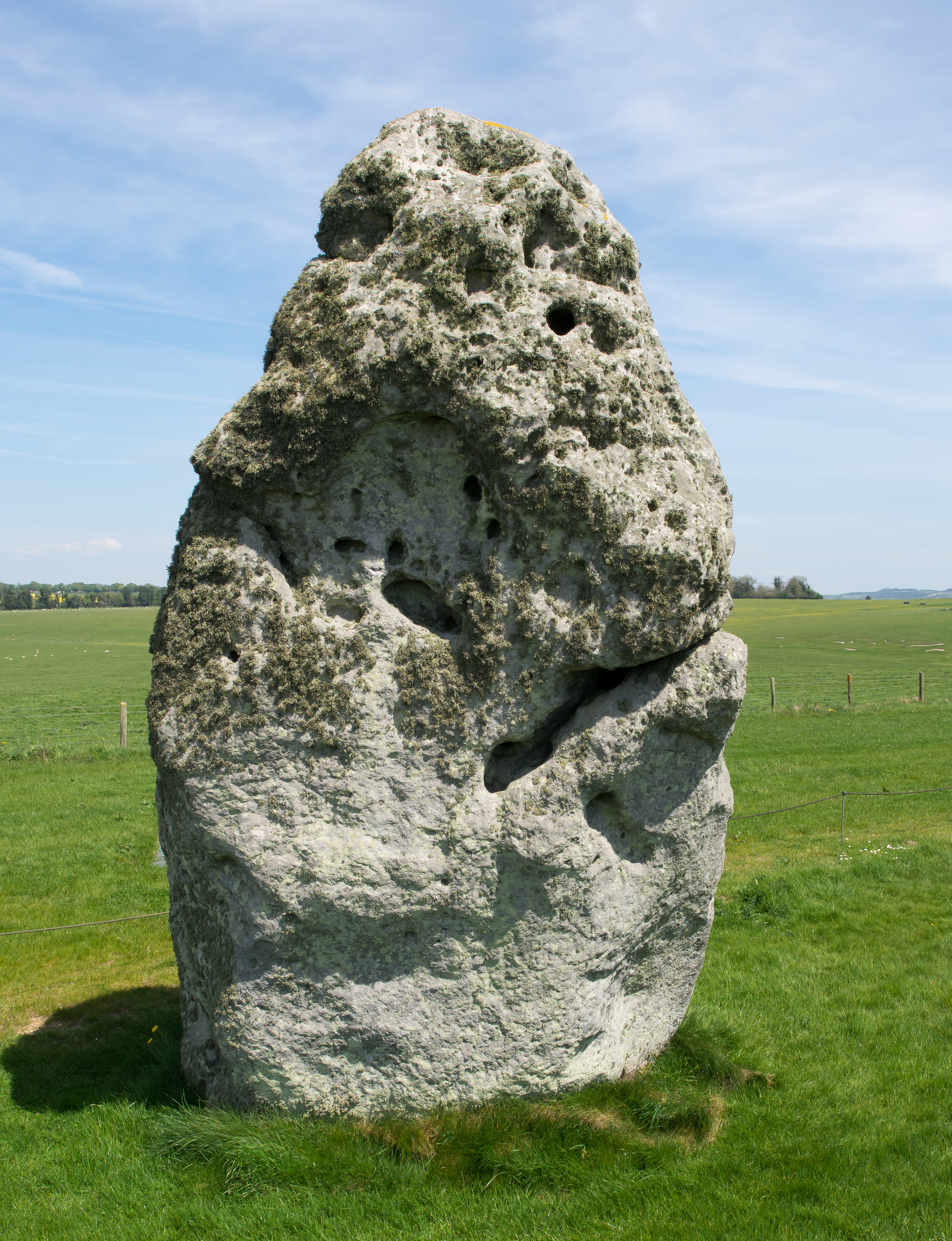
Southwest face of Heel Stone in May 2016

The Heel Stone is a single large block of sarsen stone standing within the Avenue outside the entrance of the Stonehenge earthwork in Wiltshire, England. It has a minimum thickness of 2.4 metres (7 ft 10 in), rising to a tapered top about 4.7 metres (15 ft) high. Excavation has shown that a further 1.2 metres (3 ft 11 in) is buried in the ground. It is 77.4 metres (254 ft) from the centre of Stonehenge circle. It leans towards the southwest nearly 27 degrees from the vertical. The stone has an overall girth of 7.6 metres (25 ft) and weighs about 35 tons. It is surrounded by the Heelstone Ditch.

== See also ==
- List of individual rocks
