= Richard J. C. Atkinson =

British prehistorian and archaeologist

- Born: 22 January 1920; Evershot, Dorset
- Died: 10 October 1994 (aged 74)
- Known for: Stonehenge excavations

Academic background
- Education: Sherborne School
- Alma mater: Magdalen College, Oxford

Academic work
- Discipline: Archaeologist
- Sub-discipline: Prehistory
- Institutions: University College, Cardiff

Alternative meaning: Richard Atkinson (educator)

Richard John Copland Atkinson CBE (22 January 1920 – 10 October 1994) was a British prehistorian and archaeologist.

== Biography ==
Atkinson was born in Evershot, Dorset, and went to Sherborne School and then Magdalen College, Oxford, reading Philosophy, Politics and Economics. During the Second World War, his Quaker beliefs meant that he was a conscientious objector. In 1944, he became Assistant Keeper of Archaeology at the Ashmolean Museum. In 1949, he was appointed a lecturer at the University of Edinburgh.

Atkinson directed excavations at Stonehenge for the Ministry of Works between 1950 and 1964. During this period he helped to bring theories about the origins and construction of Stonehenge to a wider audience: for example, through the BBC television programme, Buried Treasure (1954), which, among other things, sought to demonstrate, using teams of schoolboys, how the stones might have been transported by water or over land. He also produced a theory on the creation of Stonehenge.

He also investigated sites at Silbury Hill, West Kennet Long Barrow, and Wayland's Smithy and was a friend and collaborator of Peggy Piggott, Stuart Piggott and John F.S. Stone. His Silbury work was part of a BBC documentary series Chronicle on the monument. In 1958, he moved to University College, Cardiff, to become its first professor of archaeology. He remained at Cardiff until he retired in 1983. He served on the University Grants Committee. He received the CBE in 1979. Atkinson worked tirelessly to promote and develop science-based British archaeology, and was famous for his practical contributions to archaeological technique and his pragmatic solutions to on-site problems, which were listed in the handbook he wrote called Field Archaeology.

== Legacy ==
English Heritage holds Atkinson's collection of over 2,000 record photographs in the public English Heritage Archive. A selection of around 200 photographs can be viewed online on the ViewFinder website. The Wessex Gallery of Archaeology, which opened at the Salisbury Museum in summer 2014, displays Bronze Age artefacts discovered by Atkinson in July 1953.

Because of a heavy administrative burden arising from service on many committees throughout his career, including a period as Deputy Principal of University College, Cardiff, Atkinson's written reports of the excavations at Stonehenge were not complete before serious illness, mainly caused by overwork, forced total retirement.
