= Combe Hill, East Sussex =

Hill and archaeological site in England

Combe Hill
- Location of Combe Hill
- 50°47′53″N 00°14′00″E
- Location: East Sussex, England
- OS grid reference: TQ5748902215

History
- Built: Neolithic

Site notes
- Area: 1.7 ha (4.2 acres)

Scheduled monument
- Official name: Neolithic causewayed enclosure on Combe Hill
- Designated: 9 October 1981
- Reference no.: 1012497

Combe Hill is a causewayed enclosure, near Eastbourne in East Sussex, on the northern edge of the South Downs. It consists of an inner circuit of ditches and banks, incomplete where it meets a steep slope on its north side, and the remains of an outer circuit. Causewayed enclosures were built in England from shortly before 3700 BC until at least 3500 BC; they are characterized by the full or partial enclosure of an area with ditches that are interrupted by gaps, or causeways. Their purpose is not known; they may have been settlements, meeting places, or ritual sites. The historian Hadrian Allcroft included the site in his 1908 book Earthwork of England, and in 1930 E. Cecil Curwen listed it as a possible Neolithic site in a paper which attempted to provide the first list of all the causewayed enclosures in England.

The enclosure has been excavated twice: in 1949, by Reginald Musson, and in 1962, by Veronica Seton-Williams, who used it as a training opportunity for volunteers. Charcoal fragments from Musson's dig were later dated to between 3500 and 3300 BC. Musson also found a large quantity of Ebbsfleet ware pottery in one of the ditches. Seton-Williams found three polished stone axes deposited in another ditch, perhaps not long after it had been dug. The site is only 800 m (870 yd) from Butts Brow, another Neolithic enclosure, and the two locations are visible from each other; both sites may have seen Neolithic activity at the same time.

== Background ==
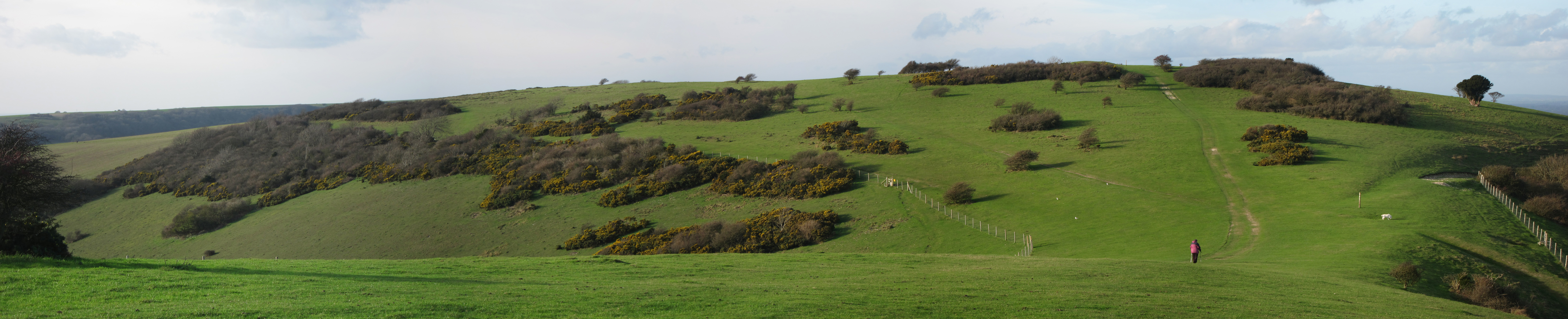
Combe Hill

Combe Hill is a causewayed enclosure, a form of earthwork that was built in northwestern Europe, including the southern British Isles, in the early Neolithic period. Causewayed enclosures are areas that are fully or partially enclosed by ditches interrupted by gaps, or causeways, of unexcavated ground, often with earthworks and palisades in some combination. The use to which these enclosures were put has long been a matter of debate. The causeways are difficult to explain in military terms since they would have provided multiple ways for attackers to pass through the ditches to the inside of the camp, though it was suggested they could have been sally ports for defenders to emerge from and attack a besieging force. Evidence of attacks on some sites support the idea that the enclosures were built as fortified settlements. (Note: For example, there is evidence that both Crickley Hill and Hambledon Hill were attacked.) They may have been seasonal meeting places, used for trading cattle or other goods such as pottery. There is also evidence that they played a role in funeral rites: material such as food, pottery, and human remains was deliberately deposited in the ditches. The construction of these enclosures took only a short time, which implies significant organization since substantial labour would have been required, for clearing the land, preparing trees for use as posts or palisades, and digging the ditches.

Over 70 causewayed enclosures have been identified in the British Isles, and they are one of the most common types of early Neolithic site in western Europe. About a thousand are known in all. They began to appear at different times in different parts of Europe: dates range from before 4000 BC in northern France, to shortly before 3000 BC in northern Germany, Denmark, and Poland. The enclosures in southern Britain began to appear shortly before 3700 BC, and continued to be built for at least 200 years; in a few cases, they continued to be used as late as 3300 to 3200 BC.

== Site ==
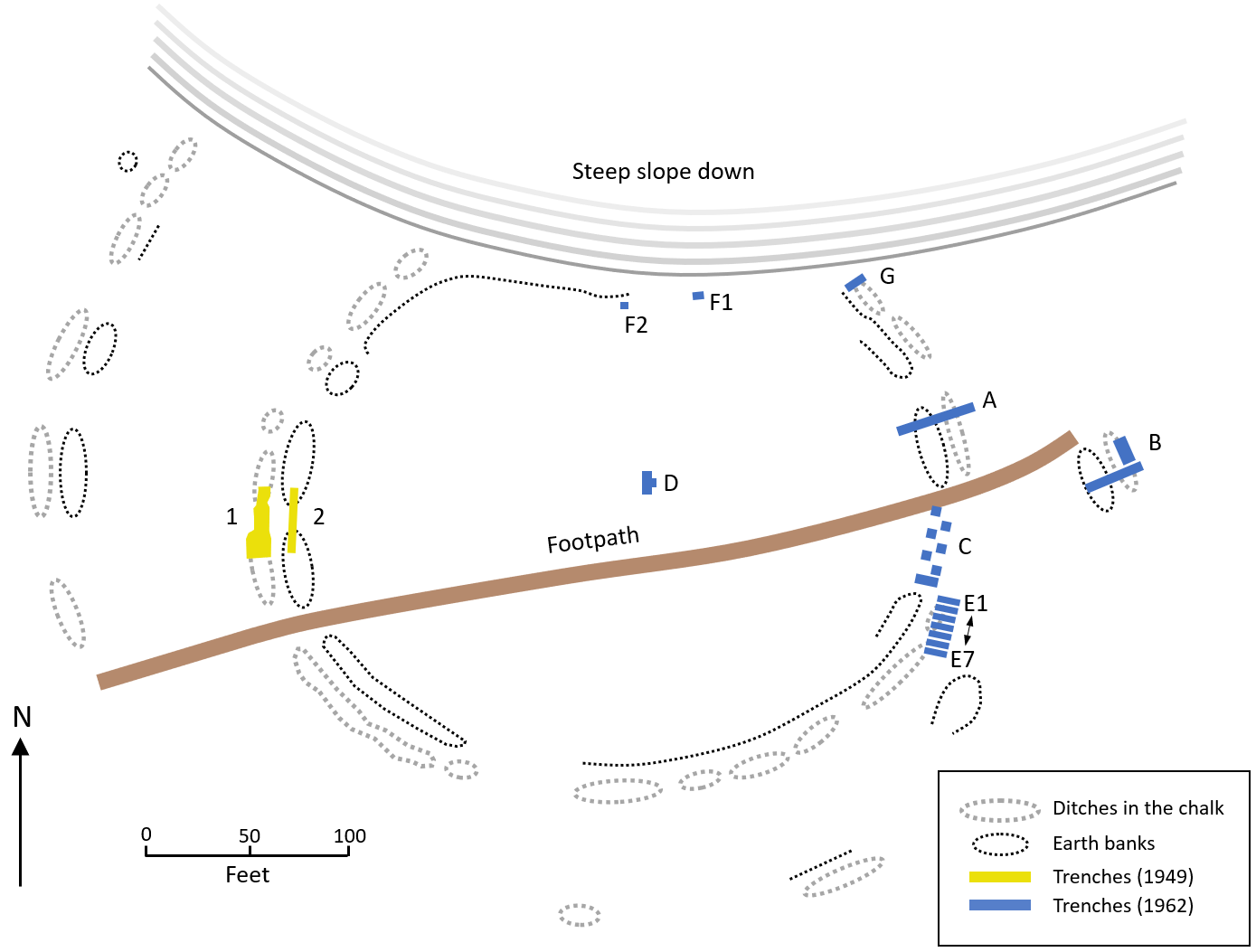
Plan of Combe Hill enclosure showing location of excavations. Musson's trenches in 1949 are in yellow, labelled 1 and 2, and Seton-Williams' trenches in 1962 are in blue, labelled A through G.

Combe Hill is on the South Downs, overlooking the Weald to the north, about five kilometres (three miles) northwest of Eastbourne, in East Sussex. An inner circuit of ditch and bank is almost complete, except for where it meets a steep downslope on the north side. The remains of an outer circuit of ditch and bank are visible to the west and east, enclosing an area of about 1.7 ha (4.2 acres), with the inner circuit covering 0.6 ha (1.5 acres). A round barrow lies about 100 m (110 yd) to the west, and two more are within 150 m (160 yd) to the east, along the same hilltop; one is possibly of Anglo-Saxon origin. The enclosure is crossed by a footpath, from Jevington northeastwards to Willingdon. Two of the causeways, at the south and east, are wider than the others, and may have originally been entranceways.

Only one radiocarbon date has been obtained from the site; it was taken from charcoal from the ditch at the south end of trench 1 in the plan at right, and indicates the site was constructed no later than the second half of the fourth millennium BC. The secondary (outer) circuit may indicate two stages of use, but the two excavations found little deposited material, and it may be that the site did not see extensive use. The great majority of pottery finds came from the western side, and are associated with animal bone and charcoal fragments; Peter Drewett, who reviewed the excavation history in 1994, suggested that three polished axes deposited at the eastern side of the enclosure were there to mark a boundary, for example if the enclosure represented the eastern extent of the territorial control of the people who built it.

A 2001 review of the areas enclosed by causewayed sites found three distinct groupings of sizes, the smallest group ranging from 0.4 and 1.2 ha (1.0 and 3.0 acres), and the median at about 0.7 ha (1.7 acres). Many of these smaller enclosures are in the upper Thames Valley, near rivers, and of the others, those at higher elevations like Combe Hill, often have a second causewayed ditch surrounding the first. Most causewayed enclosures are fairly close to circular in layout, but the inner enclosure at Combe Hill is somewhat elliptical, the long axis running east–west. The outer circuit is not as well-preserved as the inner circuit, but this may be because parts of it were levelled, perhaps during the Neolithic.

Causewayed enclosures can be broadly grouped by the physical landscapes in which they lie. Combe Hill is one of a group that lie on high ground, and like many of this type, the enclosure is placed so that it is visible from the high ground near the site, but not from the lower ground from which the hill is most clearly visible. Combe Hill's enclosure slopes slightly away from the steep north slope, so that none of the earthworks can be seen from the north—instead, it is visible from the massif of the South Downs, to its south. However, given that Combe Hill was probably constructed when trees covered the area, the cleared area would have been visible from the north as a treeless notch, above the steep slope.

A Neolithic enclosure (probably causewayed) at Butts Brow, about 800 m (870 yd) to the south of Combe Hill, was identified in 2016. The two sites are visible from each other, and dating evidence from pottery at Butts Brow makes it plausible that there was activity at both sites at the same time.

Combe Hill was listed as a scheduled monument in 1981.

== Archaeological investigations ==
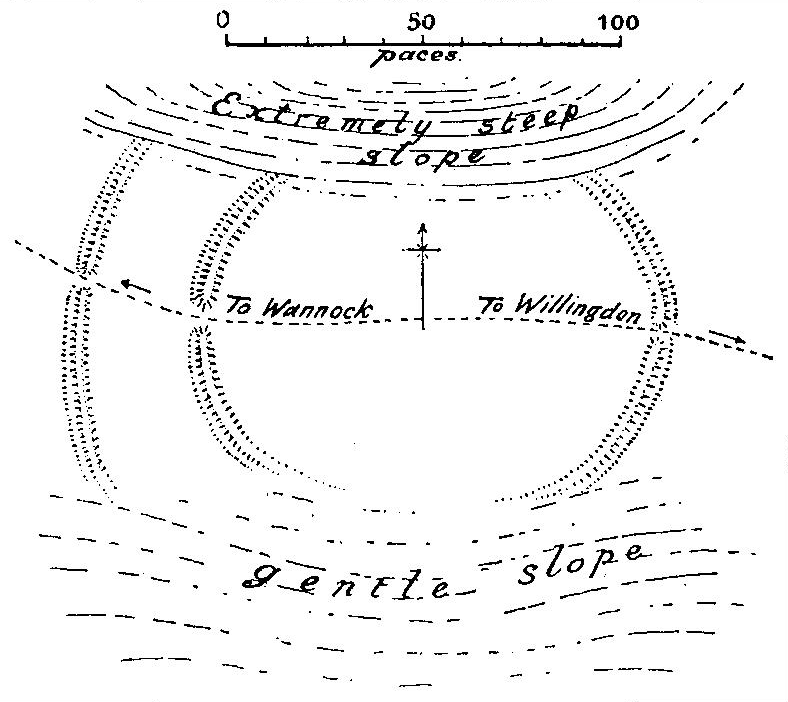
Plan of Combe Hill, omitting the part of the outer circuit to the east, by Hadrian Allcroft, from his 1908 survey Earthwork of England

The historian Hadrian Allcroft included the site in his 1908 survey, Earthwork of England; he describes it as of "almost beyond doubt of British construction", meaning that it precedes the Roman conquest. The plan he drew shows no gaps in the ditches and banks around the site, reflecting his belief (common among archaeologists at that time) that the gaps were either damage to the original structure or meant that the enclosure was unfinished, and that a plan should show the layout without gaps. The causeways separating the ditches and the associated gaps in the banks were first noticed by Veronica Keiller, the wife of the archaeologist Alexander Keiller. E. Cecil Curwen surveyed the site with a boser—a heavy rammer used for detecting underground bedrock, or the lack of it, by listening to the sound made when the boser strikes the ground—and published a plan of the site in 1929. Curwen also listed it as a possible Neolithic site in his 1930 paper "Neolithic Camps", which was the first attempt to assemble a list of all the causewayed enclosures in England.

Only one of the three barrows nearby has been investigated: Leslie Grinsell reported in 1934 that one had been opened by Major F. Maitland, in 1907, and in 1941, Curwen's father, Eliot Curwen, published a short note describing the finds, which had been donated to the Sussex Archaeological Society's museum by A.F. Maitland, the Major's son. The finds consisted of four bronze axes in excellent condition: one complete, two that had been deliberately broken in half, probably as votive offerings, and the blade from a fourth. The axes were found under a large stone, "estimated to have been about 3 cwt. in weight" (about 335 lbs), in the barrow to the west of the enclosure.

G. P. Burstow visited the hill in August 1945, and found Romano-British pottery and half-a-dozen Roman coins exposed at two or three places near the top of the hill, in some cases in tracks worn by army vehicles; an additional Roman coin was found in 1947. All were donated to the Sussex Archaeological Society's museum. The coins dated from the mid 3rd century to the early fourth century AD. In 1980, a metal detectorist found a hoard of 144 Roman coins on the north slope of Combe Hill. The latest coins in the hoard come from the reigns of Tetricus I and Tetricus II, so the hoard appears to have been buried towards the end of the third century AD.

=== Musson, 1949 ===
In 1949 Reginald Musson excavated Combe Hill for the Eastbourne Natural History and Archaeological Society, to determine the accuracy of Curwen's plan. He began by opening the north end of a ditch on the west side (at the south end of trench 1 in the diagram). This trench was extended northwards, finding first a 3.7 m (4.0 yd) long causeway of unexcavated chalk, and then the southern end of the next ditch in the circuit. The ditch at the south end of trench 1 was about 0.9 m (1.0 yd) deep and yielded 912 sherds of Neolithic pottery and plentiful flint flakes; the one at the north end was only a foot deep and contained flints, but no pottery except a few fragments of early Iron Age and Romano-British pottery, just below the turf line. The causeway was cleared down to the chalk but there were no post-holes. Musson also investigated the bank of earth next to the ditch (trench 2 in the diagram), clearing an area 1.8 by 9 metres (2 by 10 yards) to search for post-holes, but none were found.

The pottery found in the southern ditch was all identified as Ebbsfleet ware. It was not deposited at the bottom of the ditch; Musson's report shows a layer of silting below the layer containing pottery and flints, and Peter Drewett, an archaeologist who summarized Musson's work in a later review of the site, describes the pottery as a "dump", on top of a layer of "clean chalk rubble" a foot thick. Only five animal bones were found, four of ox and one from a pig. Charcoal fragments of ash, hawthorn and hazel were found; there was no oak, which was unusual, and in his later review Drewett suggested this might indicate the landscape had been cleared. Drewett arranged for some of the charcoal found by Musson to be radiocarbon dated, and the result was a date range of 3500 to 3300 BC. The enclosure was probably constructed before this range, which matches the dates known for the pottery Musson found.

A pair of tabular flints, which Musson identified as a hearth, were found in the ditch, associated with some of the bones and charcoal. A later review, as part of the Gathering Time project to date Neolithic enclosures, suggested that the lack of signs of burning cast doubt on this identification, and also commented that the steep sides of the ditch shown in Musson's section diagram might indicate that the ditch had been recut there. Musson's flint finds included a leaf-shaped arrowhead, though this had been lost by the time Drewett conducted his review. The snail shells found at different levels below the surface were analyzed in Musson's report, but no conclusions were drawn at the time. A subsequent re-analysis, based on extracting more snail shells from soil samples preserved from Musson's dig, was undertaken by K. D. Thomas, an expert on molluscs, for Drewett's 1994 review. Thomas concluded that the enclosure had been constructed in woodland that was still standing or had only recently been cleared.

=== Seton-Williams, 1962 ===
Veronica Seton-Williams spent two weeks, from 1 to 15 July 1962, excavating the site as a training exercise for a group of about twenty. She did not publish her work, but her notes and some of the finds survive, and were used by Peter Drewett in a 1994 review of the site. A total of 21 trenches were dug; Drewett comments that the reasons for the positioning of some of the trenches are unclear, and "may be explained partly by the fact that the project was run as a training excavation".

Trench A was dug across both the inner ditch and associated bank, revealing no evidence that the bank, which contained the material excavated from the ditch, had been reinforced. Trench B crossed the outer ditch and bank; a few sherds of Romano-British pottery were found in the upper layers of the trench, but nothing from within the ditch. Once the ditch had silted in, another shallow cut had been made, which Drewett dates to the Romano-British period, based on the pottery found in the layers inside the recut. In both cases the ditch appears to have silted in quickly. A set of six grid squares and a rectangular area (marked C on the diagram) were excavated over one of the causeways, finding 278 pieces of struck flint, all from the turf and topsoil layer; Drewett suggests that the causeway may have been an area where flint cores were prepared.

Trench D was in the middle of the enclosure, and revealed no finds. A series of 7 trenches, labelled E1 through E7, were cut through the ditch and bank just south of the causeway where the C trenches were dug. As with the ditch to the north it appeared that the ditch had filled with natural silt rather than having been deliberately filled in, and Drewett estimated that the lowest levels of silting might have formed within a year or two of the ditch being dug. On top of these silt layers, three polished flint axes were found deposited next to each other in trench E6. Near the top of these trenches, Beaker pottery was found. Two small trenches, labelled F1 and F2 on the diagram, were dug at the top of the slope, but found no evidence that the bank and ditch had ever extended around the enclosure's northern side. Trench G produced a few sherds and some struck flint; these were all lost by the time Drewett evaluated the results of the dig, but he suggested that the pottery was probably Romano-British, since it was found not far below the turf line.

=== Later investigations ===
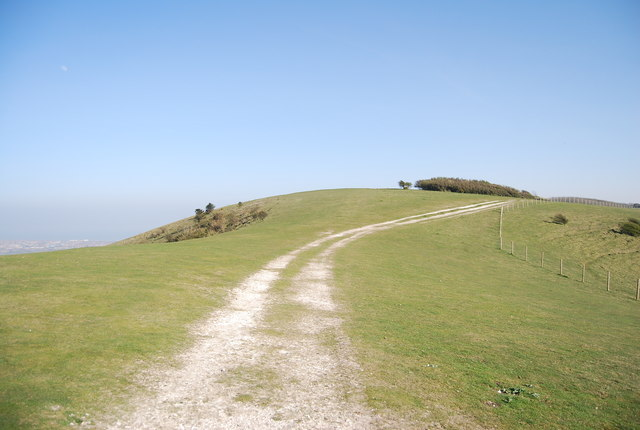
Combe Hill

In May 1983, Rodney Castleden, a Sussex resident walking on Combe Hill, found a carved chalk item partly exposed through the turf in the middle of the enclosure. The object was examined by Alan Thompson, who was researching prehistoric carved chalk finds from Sussex. Thompson suggested it may have been a half-completed carving of a phallic symbol: it was roughly rectangular in cross-section, narrowing towards one end, with incised lines on two sides. Thompson could not determine what tool had been used to carve the chalk, or the age of the item, though he cites another phallic-shaped chalk find from Itford Hill in Sussex which was considered to be from the Bronze Age. In Drewett's 1994 review he commented that since the item had not been found in the 1962 dig, which had dug a trench (labelled D on the site plan) at the spot where the item was found, it might have been carved in 1962 and left at the site.

The Royal Commission on the Historical Monuments of England included Combe Hill in a 1995 survey of multiple sites. The resulting report, by Alastair Oswald, concluded that Thomas's conclusions from snail shell evidence from Musson's excavation were consistent with most of the Neolithic enclosures in Sussex: the evidence available for all but two of the other sites indicates they were probably constructed in small clearings in woodland. The two exceptions are The Trundle and Whitehawk Camp, both thought to have been constructed at a time when the woodland had already been cleared. In 2003, Brighton & Hove Archaeological Society commissioned a resistivity survey of the site. The survey was hampered by dry weather, limiting the quality of the data, but the inner circuit and the western arc of the outer circuit were both detected. Clusters of post-holes were found in the south and east of the inner enclosure, which may have been part of a structure intended to control access to the entrances to the site.

Gathering Time was a project funded by English Heritage and the Arts and Humanities Research Council to reanalyze the radiocarbon dates of nearly 40 causewayed enclosures, using Bayesian analysis. The authors, Alasdair Whittle, Frances Healy, and Alex Bayliss, published the results in 2011. Combe Hill was included in the project, but although a few animal bones and some charcoal had been retained from the excavations, no suitable material could be found for sampling.

== Sources ==
- Allcroft, A. Hadrian (1908). Earthwork of England. London: Macmillan & Co. OCLC 4386018.
- Andersen, Niels H. (2019) [2015]. "Causewayed Enclosures in Northern and Western Europe". In Fowler, Chris; Harding, Jan; Hofmann, Daniela (eds.). The Oxford Handbook of Neolithic Europe. Oxford: Oxford University Press. pp. 795–812. ISBN 978-0-19-883249-2.
- Burstow, G. P. (1946). "Finds on Coombe Hill, Jevington". Sussex Notes and Queries. 11 (3): 54–56.
- Burstow, G. P. (1947). "A Roman Coin Found on Coombe Hill, Jevington". Sussex Notes and Queries. 11 (5): 54–56.
- Cunnington, Maud E. (1912). "Knap Hill Camp". Wiltshire Archaeological and Natural History Magazine. 37: 42–65. ISSN 0262-6608.
- Curwen, E. Cecil (1929). "Neolithic Camp, Combe Hill, Jevington" (PDF). Sussex Archaeological Collections. 70: 209–211. ISSN 0143-8204.
- Curwen, E. Cecil (1930). "Neolithic camps". Antiquity. 4 (13): 22–54. doi:10.1017/S0003598X00004178. S2CID 246055035.
- Curwen, Eliot (1940). "The Coombe Hill Hoard of Bronze Axes". Sussex Notes and Queries. 8 (4): 108–111.
- Drewett, Peter (1994). "Dr V. Seton Williams' excavations at Combe Hill, 1962, and the role of Neolithic causewayed enclosures in Sussex". Sussex Archaeological Collections. 132: 7–24. doi:10.5284/1085475. ISSN 0143-8204.
- Grinsell, L. V. (1934). "Sussex Barrows. Part 1 Analysis" (PDF). Sussex Archaeological Collections. 75: 217–275. ISSN 0143-8204.
- Healy, Frances; Bayliss, Alex; Whittle, Alasdair (2015) [2011]. "Sussex". In Whittle, Alasdair; Healy, Frances; Bayliss, Alex (eds.). Gathering Time: Dating the Early Neolithic Enclosures of Southern Britain and Ireland. Oxford: Oxbow. pp. 207–262. ISBN 978-1-84217-425-8.
- Jackson, J. Wilfrid (1950). "Animal Bones and Shells". In Musson, Reginald (1950). "An Excavation at Combe Hill Camp Near Eastbourne August 1949". Sussex Archaeological Collections. 89: 105–116. ISSN 0143-8204.
- Maby, J. Cecil (1950). "Ancient Charcoals". In Musson, Reginald (1950). "An Excavation at Combe Hill Camp Near Eastbourne August 1949". Sussex Archaeological Collections. 89: 105–116. ISSN 0143-8204.
- Musson, Reginald (1950). "An Excavation at Combe Hill Camp Near Eastbourne August 1949" (PDF). Sussex Archaeological Collections. 89: 105–116. doi:10.5284/1086091. ISSN 0143-8204.
- Oswald, Alastair (March 1995). A Causewayed Enclosure on Combe Hill, Eastbourne, East Sussex (Report). RCHME.
- Oswald, Alastair; Dyer, Carolyn; Barber, Martin (2001). The Creation of Monuments: Neolithic Causewayed Enclosures in the British Isles. Swindon, UK: English Heritage. ISBN 1-873592-42-6.
- Patton, Stephen (2022). "Butts Brow: Combe Hill's counterpart? Initial excavations at an Early Neolithic enclosure in Eastbourne". Marking Place: New perspectives on early Neolithic enclosures. Oxford: Oxbow Books. pp. 151–165. ISBN 978-1-78925-710-6.
- Rudling, David (1984). "A Hoard of Roman Coins from Combe Hill, East Sussex" (PDF). Sussex Archaeological Collections. 122: 218–219. ISSN 0143-8204.
- Sheridan, Alison (2012). "Book Review Alasdair Whittle, Frances Healy & Alex Bayliss. Gathering time: Dating the Early Neolithic enclosures of southern Britain and Ireland". Antiquity. 86 (331): 262–264. doi:10.1017/S0003598X00062670. S2CID 163744148.
- Thomas, K. D. (1994). "Evidence for the Environmental Setting of the Neolithic Enclosure at Combe Hill, East Sussex". In Drewett, Peter (1994). "Dr V. Seton Williams' excavations at Combe Hill, 1962, and the role of Neolithic causewayed enclosures in Sussex". Sussex Archaeological Collections. 132: 7–24. ISSN 0143-8204.
- Thompson, Alan (1984). "Carved Chalk Object Found at Combe Hill, Jevington, East Sussex" (PDF). Sussex Archaeological Collections. 122: 216–217. ISSN 0143-8204.
- Whittle, Alasdair; Healy, Frances; Bayliss, Alex (2015) [2011]. "Gathering time: causewayed enclosures and the early Neolithic of southern Britain and Ireland". In Whittle, Alasdair; Healy, Frances; Bayliss, Alex (eds.). Gathering Time: Dating the Early Neolithic Enclosures of Southern Britain and Ireland. Oxford: Oxbow. pp. 1–16. ISBN 978-1-84217-425-8.
