= Offham Hill =

Hill and archaeological site in England

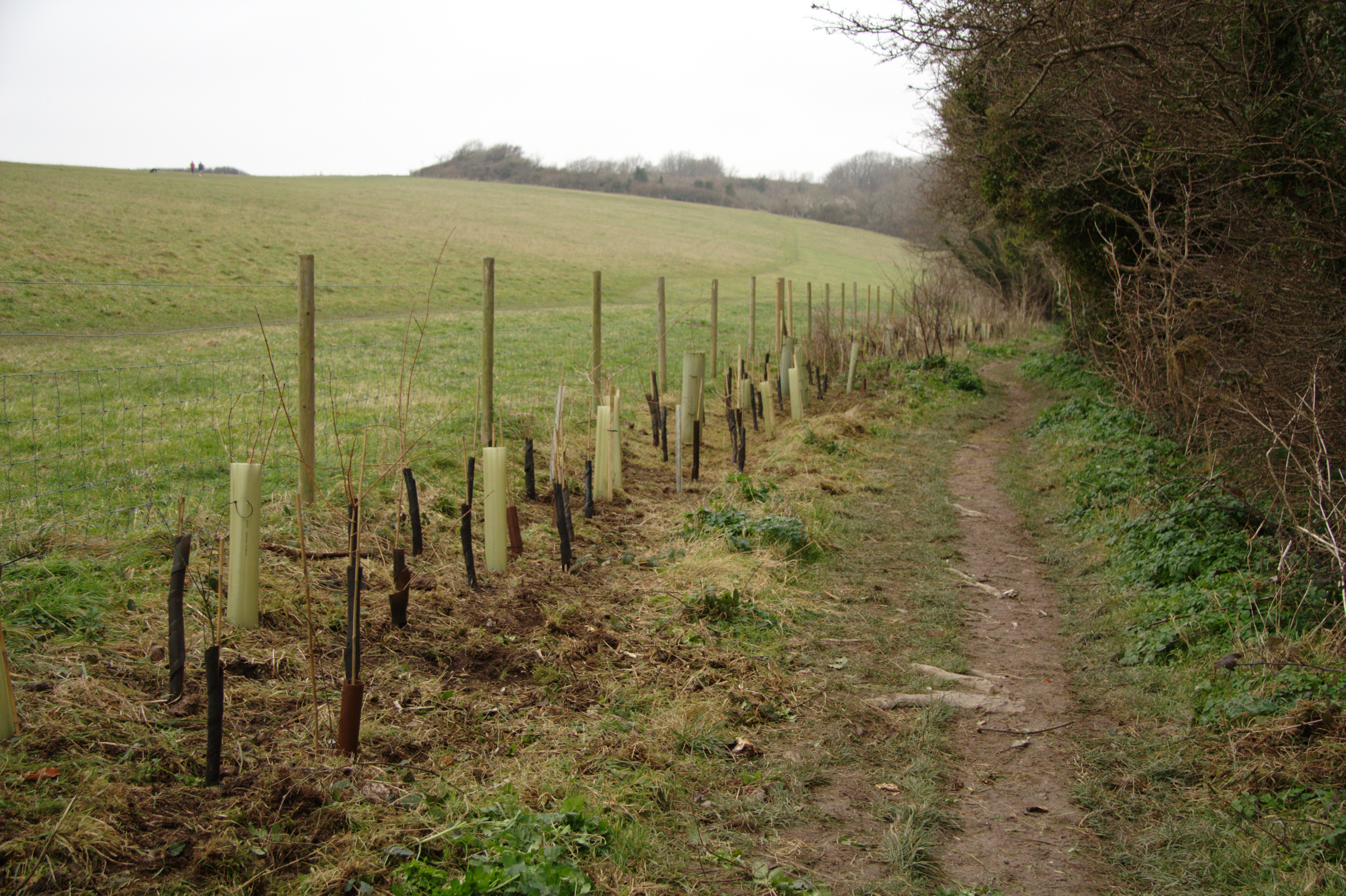

- Location of Offham Hill
- 50°53′13.8″N 00°00′48.2″W
- Location: Near Lewes, East Sussex, England
- OS grid reference: TQ 39882 11810

History
- Built: Neolithic

Site notes
- Area: 1.0 ha (2.5 acres)

Scheduled monument
- Official name: Causewayed enclosure on Offham Hill
- Designated: 11 November 1954
- Reference no.: 1014534

Offham Hill is a causewayed enclosure near Lewes, East Sussex, England. Causewayed enclosures were built in England from shortly before 3700 BC until about 3300 BC; they are characterized by the full or partial enclosure of an area with ditches that are interrupted by gaps, or causeways. Their purpose is not known; they may have been settlements, meeting places, or ritual sites. The site was identified as a possible causewayed enclosure in 1964 by a member of the Sussex Archaeological Society. The Ordnance Survey inspected the site in 1972 and recommended an excavation, which was carried out in 1976 by Peter Drewett.

The site had been badly damaged by ploughing by the time of Drewett's excavation, which limited his ability to draw conclusions from finds in the ploughsoil. Drewett mapped what appeared to be ditches, banks, and causeways before beginning to dig, and then cleared about half the site down to the chalk, confirming the location of the ditches and causeways. The majority of Drewett's finds came from the ditches, including about 7,000 worked flints, nearly 300 sherds of pottery, a human burial, other human bone, and animal remains. Most of the pottery was identified as Neolithic, and radiocarbon dating of charcoal found in one of the ditches confirmed that the enclosure dated to the Neolithic. A reanalysis of the radiocarbon dates in 2011, along with further radiocarbon dates from the human remains, concluded that the enclosure was constructed in the mid-fourth millennium BC. Further ploughing after the 1976 excavation led to the complete destruction of the site, in Drewett's opinion. The site was designated a scheduled monument in 1954.

== Background ==
Offham Hill is a causewayed enclosure, a form of earthwork that was built in northwestern Europe, including the southern British Isles, in the early Neolithic. Causewayed enclosures are areas that are fully or partially enclosed by ditches interrupted by gaps, or causeways, of unexcavated ground, often with earthworks and palisades in some combination. The purpose of these enclosures has long been a matter of debate. The causeways are difficult to explain in military terms as they would have provided multiple ways for attackers to pass through the ditches to the inside of the camp, although it has been suggested they could have been sally ports for defenders to emerge from and attack a besieging force. Evidence of attacks at some sites provides support for the idea that the enclosures were fortified settlements. (Note: For example, there is evidence that both Crickley Hill and Hambledon Hill were attacked.) They may have been seasonal meeting places, used for trading cattle or other goods such as pottery. There is also evidence that they played a role in funeral rites: material such as food, pottery, and human remains was deliberately deposited in the ditches. The construction of these enclosures was rapid, implying significant organization, as substantial labour would have been required for clearing the land, preparing trees for use as posts or palisades, and digging the ditches.

Over seventy causewayed enclosures have been identified in the British Isles, and they are one of the most common types of early Neolithic site in western Europe. About a thousand are known in all. They began to appear at different times in different parts of Europe: dates range from before 4000 BC in northern France, to shortly before 3000 BC in northern Germany, Denmark, and Poland. The enclosures in southern Britain began to appear shortly before 3700 BC, and continued to be built for at least 200 years; in a few cases, they continued to be used as late as 3300 to 3200 BC.

== Site ==
The site is on the north face of Offham Hill, above the Ouse valley, on the edge of the South Downs, north of Lewes, in East Sussex. The eastern part of the site was completely destroyed by a chalk quarry during the 19th century. What remains is two concentric circuits of ditches with banks paralleling them to the interior; there are gaps in the banks that correspond to the causeways in the ditches. The site was known in the 1930s, but not considered to be a possible causewayed enclosure until 1973, after the site had been cleared and ploughed. There is no evidence for medieval agriculture elsewhere on the hill, and archaeologist Peter Drewett, who excavated the site in 1976, considered that this implied the site had not been ploughed until relatively recently.

Plough damage was extensive by the early 1970s, and Drewett refers to the ploughing that followed the dig as having led to the "obliteration" of the site. Because of the quarry damage, the layout of the complete circuit is unknown, and Drewett suggested it may have been incomplete and D-shaped, rather than circular, with no ditches or banks across the steepest part of the slope – a layout that is known from Combe Hill, another causewayed enclosure in East Sussex. A subsequent summary of research, by Historic England, considered that Drewett's plan of the site did not show how close to perfectly circular the enclosure was, and that it was very possible that the circuit had originally been complete. Because the site has been partly destroyed, the site's original area is not certain, but it was probably about 1 ha (2.5 acres). A 2001 review of the areas enclosed by causewayed sites found three distinct groupings of sizes, with the smallest group ranging from 0.4 and 1.2 ha (0.99 and 3.0 acres), with the median at about 0.7 ha (1.7 acres). Many of these smaller enclosures are in the upper Thames Valley, near rivers, and of the others, those at higher elevations, like Offham Hill, often have a second causewayed ditch surrounding the first.

There are two round barrows about 50 m (160 ft) south of the site; Drewett records that these are all that remains of a larger group that has been destroyed by development. Offham Hill was designated a scheduled monument in 1954.

== Archaeological investigations ==
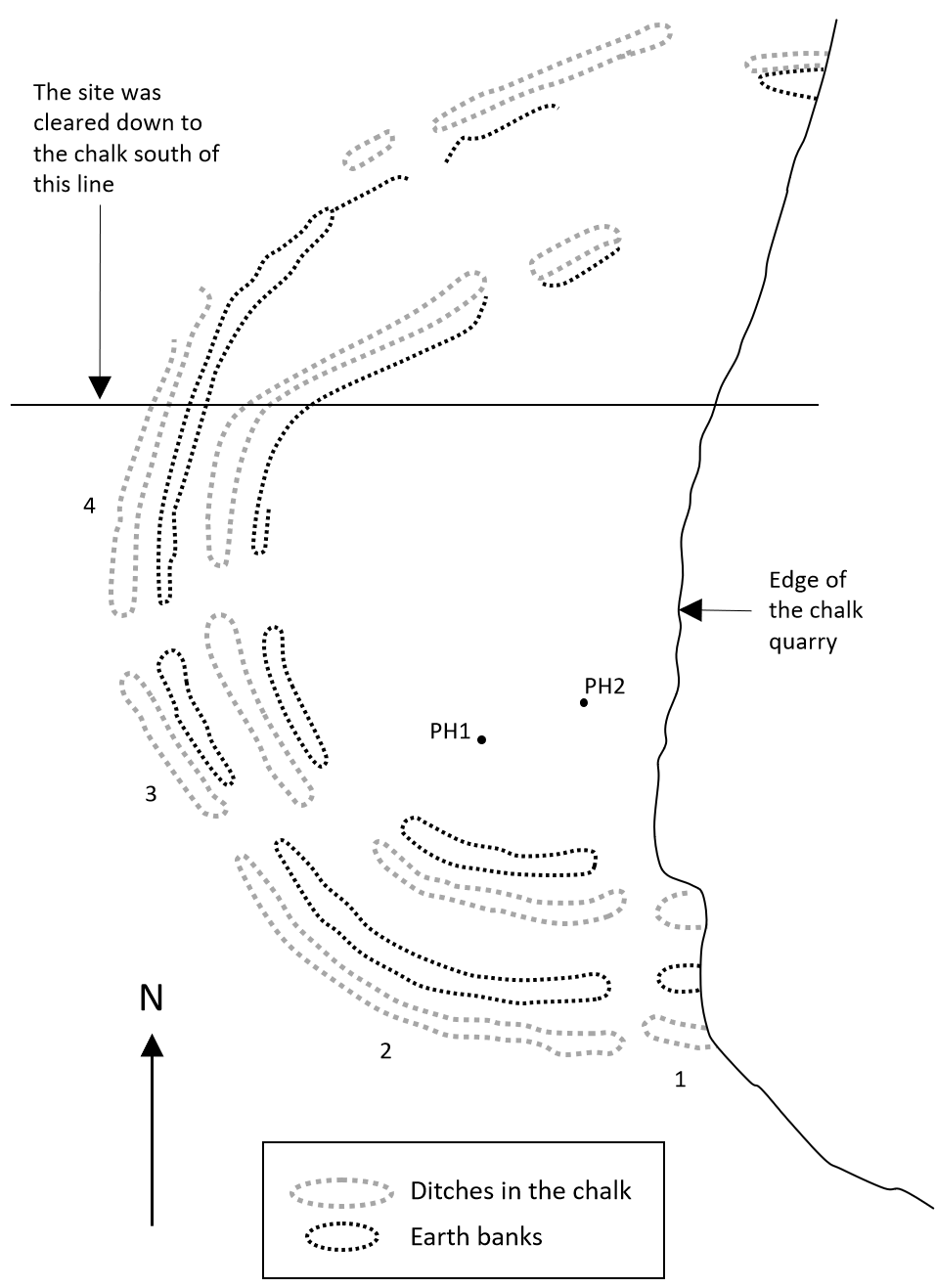
Plan of Offham Hill, showing the locations of the banks and suspected ditches before the excavation began

In 1935, the Inspectorate of Ancient Monuments asked E. Cecil Curwen, an expert on Sussex Neolithic sites, whether Offham Hill should be listed as a scheduled monument. Curwen replied that while it was clearly an "ancient concentric-ringed enclosure with at least two ditches", the site was too overgrown to say more than that, though he felt it was "not convincingly Neolithic". The area of the site that is scheduled was reduced after the 1976 excavations, since that dig completely cleared the southern half of the site.

=== Thomson and Holden, 1964 to 1972 ===
In 1964, David Thomson, a member of the Sussex Archaeological Society, examined the earthworks on Offham Hill and suggested to the archaeologist Eric Holden that it might be a Neolithic causewayed enclosure. Holden and Thomson visited the site, and found some worked flint, though they could not determine the date. Holden agreed with Thomson's assessment of the site. In 1972 the Archaeology Division of the Ordnance Survey inspected the site, and identified four possible causeways, but commented that excavation would be needed in order to be certain.

=== Drewett, 1976 ===
Offham Hill was excavated in 1976 by Drewett as one of four rescue archaeology projects carried out by the Sussex Archaeological Field Unit that year. Drewett comments in his account of the dig that the site was so damaged by ploughing that any finds within the ploughsoil would have no meaningful context, so the top layer of soil was removed using earth-moving equipment. Before excavating, Drewett created a plan of the site showing the ditches and banks, relying on soil marks and changes to the vegetation noticeable through the stubble on the farmed part of the site, and slight changes in the ground level to guide him. He drew another plan after excavating half the site down to the chalk, showing ditches that were in fairly close agreement with the first drawing.

The banks were so heavily damaged that the only place where the original material could be examined was at the quarry face, where quarrying had cut a section through one of the banks. Even here only 10 cm (3.9 in) of material, described by Drewett as "rubbly chalk", survived. The ditches were of varying depth; none were deeper than 80 cm (2.6 ft), and most were shallow enough that burrows and tree roots had disturbed their contents. The ditches were very irregular, and Drewett considers they may have been dug as separate pits that were later connected by digging between them. The causeways for the inner and outer circuits were aligned at one point on the west side of the site, and Drewett interpreted this as the site's entrance.

A few flints had been found in December 1974 by walking the site, and a few more during the stripping of the ploughsoil by machine; the great majority of the flint finds were from the ditches. A total of almost 7,000 flakes of flint were recovered, with about two-thirds coming from the earliest part of the ditch fill, and almost all the rest from the upper fill, which had been disturbed by tree roots and animal burrows as well as by ploughing, and did not provide a secure context for dating. Few implements, as opposed to waste flakes and cores, were found; they included eight arrowheads, a dozen worked flakes, two scrapers, and a polished axe, which had been reground at least once and which was the only implement not found in the ditches. There were eight areas of concentration of flakes in the ditches, so it may be that flint was knapped in the ditches and the worked results and prepared cores were taken elsewhere, which would explain the small number of implements found in the ditches. However, Drewett noted that there were "very few of the tiny chips likely in a flaking assemblage found in situ", perhaps indicating that the ditches contained waste flakes from knapping done elsewhere in the enclosure.

Pottery finds included 171 Neolithic sherds, with another 49 dated to the Bronze Age, and 50 more to the Iron Age. Six sherds were dated to the Romano-British occupation. The Neolithic pottery was generally similar to the pottery finds at other causewayed enclosures in Sussex, such as Barkhale Camp, Whitehawk Camp, and Combe Hill, and probably dates to the early Neolithic.

At the northern end of the excavated part of outer ditch 4 (see the plan), a human burial was found. The skeleton, of a man in his twenties, was in a small pit in the ditch, in a crouched position; there were no grave goods. The other human bone finds, which included teeth, parts of mandibles, a fibula, a phalanx, and a rib fragment, could not be definitely identified as burials. Another pit, in outer ditch 2, contained unabraded sherds from a single pot, a flint arrowhead, and bones and teeth from red deer, roe deer, beaver, cattle, and pig. Animal bones found in the lowest layers of the ditches, which could hence be confidently dated to the same time as the construction of the site, included only a handful of cattle and sheep bones. The layers above, which were probably Neolithic in date but which may have contained some later material intruded by ploughing, also included bones from red deer, roe deer, pig, beaver, and dog. There were rabbit bones, but all were later intrusions. Samples of soil were taken from below the ditches and from below a bank, where it was thought likely the buried soil was contemporary with the site's construction, and sieved for snail shells. The relative frequency of species which live only in shade and those that live in open country was examined to determine whether the site was woodland or had been cleared. It is likely that the area was cleared of trees at the time the site was built, since few open-country species were found. It is possible that the site was surrounded by woodland for some time after construction, making the ditches less likely to have been colonized by open-country species; it is also possible that the site went out of use quickly, with little time to attract other species. The inner ditch and the buried soil under the bank had very similar molluscan fauna, differing from the outer ditch, and implying the outer ditch was dug some time later than the inner ditch.

Radiocarbon dates were obtained from charcoal found in two layers of inner ditch 2. The charcoal from the lower layer was dated to 3950–3530 BC, and the charcoal from the layer above it was dated to 3650–3360 BC.

=== RCHME, 1997, and Gathering Time, 2011 ===
In October 1997 the Royal Commission on the Historical Monuments of England (RCHME) surveyed Offham Hill as part of a project that included multiple causewayed enclosures, and added the chalk quarry and some fox holes to the monument record. Offham Hill was one of the sites included in Gathering Time, a project funded by English Heritage and the Arts and Humanities Research Council to reanalyse the radiocarbon dates of nearly 40 causewayed enclosures, using Bayesian analysis. The authors, Alasdair Whittle, Frances Healy, and Alex Bayliss, published the results in 2011. The analysis made use of the charcoal dates obtained by Drewett, combined with new dates obtained from the human burial, and concluded that the enclosure was constructed in the mid-fourth millennium BC, with the most likely dates (68% probability) between 3630 BC and 3505 BC.

== Sources ==
- Andersen, Niels H. (2019) [2015]. "Causewayed Enclosures in Northern and Western Europe". In Fowler, Chris; Harding, Jan; Hofmann, Daniela (eds.). The Oxford Handbook of Neolithic Europe. Oxford: Oxford University Press. pp. 795–812. ISBN 978-0-19-883249-2.
- Cunnington, M.E. (1912). "Knap Hill Camp". Wiltshire Archaeological and Natural History Magazine. 37: 42–65. ISSN 0262-6608.
- Curwen, E. Cecil (1930). "Neolithic camps". Antiquity. 4 (13): 22–54. doi:10.1017/S0003598X00004178. S2CID 246055035. Archived from the original on 9 November 2020.
- Drewett, Peter (1977). "The Excavation of a Neolithic Causewayed Enclosure on Offham Hill, East Sussex, 1976". Proceedings of the Prehistoric Society. 43: 201–241. doi:10.1017/S0079497X00010380. S2CID 131038477.
- Healy, Frances; Bayliss, Alex; Whittle, Alasdair (2015) [2011]. "Sussex". In Whittle, Alasdair; Healy, Frances; Bayliss, Alex (eds.). Gathering Time: Dating the Early Neolithic Enclosures of Southern Britain and Ireland. Oxford: Oxbow. pp. 207–262. ISBN 978-1-84217-425-8.
- Holden, E.W. (1973). "The Possible Remains of a Neolithic Causewayed Camp on Offham Hill, Hamsey, Near Lewes, TQ3988175" (PDF). Sussex Archaeological Collections. 111: 109–110. ISSN 0143-8204.
- James, B. (1977). "The Flint Industry". In Drewett, Peter (1977). "The Excavation of a Neolithic Causewayed Enclosure on Offham Hill, East Sussex, 1976". Proceedings of the Prehistoric Society. 43: 201–241. doi:10.1017/S0079497X00010380. S2CID 131038477.
- O'Connor, T. P. (1977a). "The Human Skeletal Remains". In Drewett, Peter (1977). "The Excavation of a Neolithic Causewayed Enclosure on Offham Hill, East Sussex, 1976". Proceedings of the Prehistoric Society. 43: 201–241. doi:10.1017/S0079497X00010380. S2CID 131038477.
- O'Connor, T. P. (1977b). "Animal Skeletal Material". In Drewett, Peter (1977). "The Excavation of a Neolithic Causewayed Enclosure on Offham Hill, East Sussex, 1976". Proceedings of the Prehistoric Society. 43: 201–241. doi:10.1017/S0079497X00010380. S2CID 131038477.
- Oswald, Alastair; Dyer, Carolyn; Barber, Martin (2001). The Creation of Monuments: Neolithic Causewayed Enclosures in the British Isles. Swindon, UK: English Heritage. ISBN 1-873592-42-6.
- Sheridan, Alison (22 February 2012). "Book Review Alasdair Whittle, Frances Healy & Alex Bayliss. Gathering time: dating the Early Neolithic enclosures of southern Britain and Ireland". Antiquity (331): 262–264. doi:10.1017/S0003598X00062670. S2CID 163744148. Archived from the original on 18 January 2022.
- Thomas, K. D. (1977). "The Land Mollusca from the Enclosure on Offham Hill". In Drewett, Peter (1977). "The Excavation of a Neolithic Causewayed Enclosure on Offham Hill, East Sussex, 1976". Proceedings of the Prehistoric Society. 43: 201–241. doi:10.1017/S0079497X00010380. S2CID 131038477.
- Whittle, Alasdair; Healy, Frances; Bayliss, Alex (2015) [2011]. "Gathering time: causewayed enclosures and the early Neolithic of southern Britain and Ireland". In Whittle, Alasdair; Healy, Frances; Bayliss, Alex (eds.). Gathering Time: Dating the Early Neolithic Enclosures of Southern Britain and Ireland. Oxford: Oxbow. pp. 1–16. ISBN 978-1-84217-425-8.
