= Freston causewayed enclosure =

Prehistoric site in Suffolk, England

Freston
- Location of Freston
- 51°59′51″N 01°09′24″E
- Location: Suffolk, England
- OS grid reference: TM16803795

History
- Built: Neolithic

Site notes
- Area: 8.55 ha (21.1 acres)

Scheduled monument
- Official name: Interrupted Ditch System/Causewayed Enclosure at Potash Farm
- Reference no.: 1005982

Freston is a Neolithic causewayed enclosure, an archaeological site near the village of Freston in Suffolk, England. Causewayed enclosures were built in England from shortly before 3700 until at least 3500 BC; they are characterised by the full or partial enclosure of an area with ditches that are interrupted by gaps, or causeways. Their purpose is unknown; they may have been settlements, meeting places, or ritual sites.

The Freston enclosure was first identified in 1969 from cropmarks (Note: A cropmark is an area of a field in which the crops grow differently because of differences in the soil beneath them. This can indicate the presence of a ditch cut in the bedrock, beneath the soil, or of a sunken wall, among other anomalies.) in aerial photographs. At 8.55 ha (21.1 acres) it is one of the largest causewayed enclosures in Britain, and would have required thousands of person-days to construct. The cropmarks show an enclosure with two circuits of ditches, and a palisade that ran between the two circuits. There is also evidence of a rectangular structure in the northeastern part of the site, which may be a Neolithic longhouse or an Anglo-Saxon hall. In 2018, a group from McMaster University organized a research project focused on the site, beginning with a geophysical survey and a pedestrian survey to collect any items of archaeological interest from the surface of the site. This was followed by an excavation in 2019 which recovered some Neolithic material and obtained radiocarbon dates indicating that the site was constructed in the mid-4th millennium BC. Other finds included oak charcoal fragments believed to come from the palisade, and evidence of a long ditch to the southeast that probably predated the enclosure, and which may have accompanied a long barrow, a form of Neolithic burial mound. The site has been protected as a scheduled monument since 1976.

== Background ==
Freston is a causewayed enclosure, a form of earthwork that was built in northwestern Europe in the early Neolithic period. Causewayed enclosures are areas that are fully or partially enclosed by ditches interrupted by gaps, or causeways, of unexcavated ground, often with earthworks and palisades in some combination. The function of causewayed enclosures is debated. They may have been settlements, perhaps for a single family, or used for herding animals. The causeways are difficult to explain in military terms since they would have provided multiple ways for attackers to pass through the ditches to the inside of the enclosure, though archaeologists have suggested they could have been sally ports that defenders could emerge from to attack a besieging force. (Note: Both Maud Cunnington, who excavated Knap Hill in 1908 and 1909, and E. Cecil Curwen, an early investigator of several causewayed enclosures, suggested that the gaps might be explained as sally ports.) Evidence of attacks at some sites provided support for the idea that the enclosures were fortified. (Note: For example, there is evidence that both Crickley Hill and Hambledon Hill were attacked.) They may have been seasonal meeting places, used for trading. There is also evidence that the enclosures played a role in funeral rites: food, pottery, and human remains have all been found deliberately deposited in the ditches.

The construction of these sites would have required substantial labour for clearing the land, preparing trees for use as posts or palisades, and digging the ditches, and would probably have been planned for some time in advance, as the enclosures were built in a single operation. Over seventy causewayed enclosures have been identified in the British Isles, and they are one of the most common types of early Neolithic site in Western Europe. About a thousand are known in all. They began to appear at different times in different parts of Europe: dates range from before 4000 BC in northern France, to shortly before 3000 BC in northern Germany, Denmark, and Poland. The enclosures began to appear in southern Britain shortly before 3700 BC, and continued to be built for at least 200 years; in a few cases, they continued to be used as late as 3300 to 3200 BC.

== Site ==
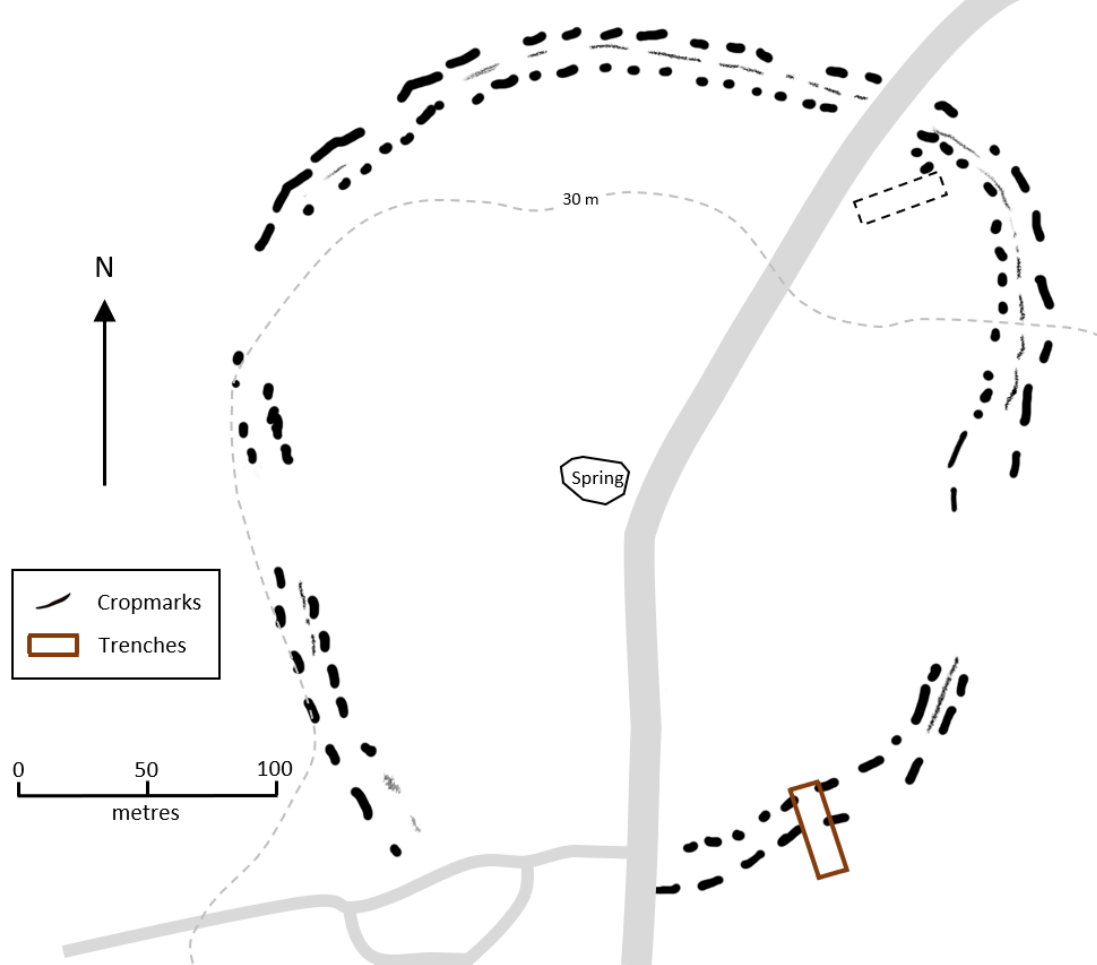
Map of the causewayed enclosure, showing the road passing through it, the location of the trench dug in 2019, and the possible Neolithic longhouse in the northeast corner. A long barrow may exist to the southeast of the site.

The Freston enclosure is in Suffolk, near the village of Freston, south of Ipswich. It lies 31 m (102 ft) above sea level on the Shotley peninsula in southeast East Anglia, between the estuaries of the Orwell and Stour rivers. A modern road, the B1080, passes through the site from south to northeast. Farm buildings (part of Potash Farm) along the southwest part of the circuit date from the 17th century, and in the 19th century two cottages (known as Latimer Cottages) were built to the southeast of the centre of the enclosure. The site became a scheduled monument in 1976.

The ditch circuits, as revealed by cropmarks, consist of two concentric circles, with numerous gaps in the ditches. Cropmarks also show faint traces of a line between the circuits which may indicate where a palisade once stood, though this is only clear in the north and northeastern parts of the circuit. The remains of a rectangular structure, 37 by 9 m (121 by 30 ft), can be detected within the enclosure in the northeastern corner. The structure has not been dated, but it is likely to be either a Neolithic longhouse or an Anglo-Saxon hall. Few such buildings have been found, and either would make Freston a site of "potentially national importance", according to English Heritage. If it is a longhouse, it could have been built either before or after the enclosure was constructed.

The enclosure is 8.55 ha (21.1 acres) in area, which makes it one of the largest causewayed enclosures in Britain. The short sections of the ditch that have been excavated were found to be well over 2 m (6.6 ft) deep, significantly deeper than those of other nearby enclosures. The excavators calculated that, if the ditches were all equally deep, they would have taken between 2,800 and 4,200 person-days to dig, and stated that the project would have been "one of the greatest Early Neolithic engineering works of East Anglia". Freston appears to have at least two and perhaps as many as five entrances, defined as places where wide causeways line up in both circuits to make a broad path to the interior of the site. Another possible explanation for some of the gaps in the circuit, where no cropmarks can be seen, is that the spring in the centre of the site may have periodically overflowed, carving an east-west channel which has since filled in, and eliminating the cropmarks that might have appeared at the points where the stream crossed the circuit. The site has no features that are visible above ground; all banks and ditches have been levelled by ploughing, perhaps as long as 2,000 years ago.

Neolithic farmers began to reach Britain in about 4050 BC, spreading from mainland Europe across the English Channel, and reaching southeastern England, including Suffolk, early in this migration. Freston is about 13 km (8 mi) from the sea; it would have been about 18 km (11 mi) from the sea at the start of the Neolithic. The location between two river valleys would have made it more easily accessible to the groups that crossed by sea from mainland Europe, and a spring within the enclosure would have made the site attractive—for practical reasons, and perhaps also for the ritual or symbolic significance of springs.

Radiocarbon dating suggests that the inner ditch was built between 3800 and 3500 BC, with the most likely period around 3700 BC. The palisade was probably added some time after the initial construction of the enclosure, and the rectangular structure at the northeast corner of the enclosure was also probably constructed some time after the ditches were dug.

== Archaeological investigations ==
=== Discovery, fieldwalking, and watching briefs ===
Aerial photographs taken by the Royal Air Force in 1944 showed no sign of cropmarks; the site is partly visible in a series of photographs taken in 1966 by the Ordnance Survey, but was not noticed at the time. The site was discovered in 1969 by J. K. St Joseph, who ran the Cambridge University Committee for Aerial Photography (CUCAP) program for many years; he identified it on a reconnaissance flight that year and took aerial photographs that recorded cropmarks in the northern part of the site. Further photography was undertaken in the 1970s by CUCAP and the Royal Commission on the Historical Monuments of England (RCHME). The site was included on a list of sixteen possible causewayed enclosures based on observed cropmarks published in 1975. Fieldwalking (surveying the site on foot) in the winter of 1979–1980 and again in 1985 found some worked flint, including an arrowhead, pot boilers, blades, and flint flakes. In 1995 Carolyn Dyer of the Air Photography Unit of the RCHME used aerial photographs to create a map of the site showing the cropmarks overlaid on the local topography.

In 2007 a geophysical survey was performed on the northeastern quadrant of the enclosure, east of the B1080, using magnetometry and earth resistance measurements. The survey identified several possible pits, some of which could be Saxon sunken-featured buildings, though this will require excavation to confirm. The survey also found a linear feature that might be a Neolithic trackway, running past the rectangular structure in the northeast of the site. In November 2007 construction work on one of the cottages within the enclosure required archaeological monitoring, which identified a single flint from the diggings.

Although the site is a scheduled national monument, the area of the road that passes through it is not protected, and in 2010 the local electricity provider excavated a trench alongside the southern part of the road, to bury a cable that had been run overhead on telegraph poles. The excavation was monitored, and the removed soil examined for artefacts. Four sherds of pottery were found; two were thought to date to the Middle Bronze Age (about 1400 BC to 1000 BC), but the other two could not be dated. A total of 47 flints were recovered, dated from the early to late Neolithic. Three flakes were identified as a type of flint known to come from the Thames Basin.

=== FARM project ===
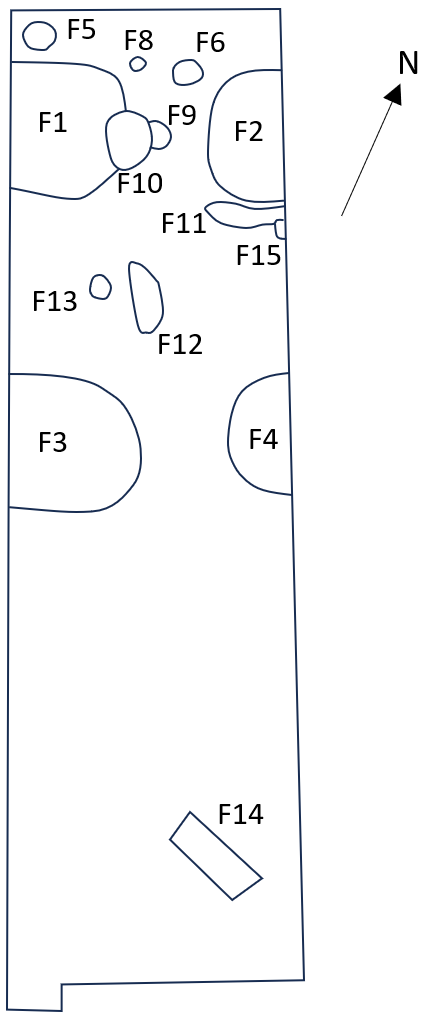
Features identified in the trench excavated in 2019, numbered 1–6 and 8–15

In 2018 a team from McMaster University began the Freston Archaeological Research Mission (FARM), a project designed to gather more information about the enclosure, and to contribute to the study of the cultural changes of the early Neolithic. That year Tristan Carter and Deanna Aubert of McMaster University conducted two weeks of fieldwalking on Latimer Field, a small part of which overlaps with the southeast quadrant of the site, to the east of the B1080. The finds were sparse compared to results from other Neolithic sites. Twelve flints were found, all of which were considered to date to the Early Neolithic, except for two gunflints, probably dating from the 17th or 18th century AD. Ceramic finds included a sherd of Thetford ware, dated to the 9th to 11th centuries AD, and some salt-glazed stoneware that was manufactured between 1400 and 1900 AD. Most sherds were from the 18th or 19th century. Other finds included glass from bottles, glasses, bowls and serving vessels; roof-tile fragments; and pieces of clay pipe stems. Most of the area that was surveyed lay outside the causewayed enclosure, and the low density of finds was consistent with the results of the geophysical survey in 2007, which had found "increased activity within the enclosure and very little activity outside it". The ceramic finds were spread more or less evenly across the field, rather than being more common near the cottages by the northwestern corner of the field, and this may have been from manuring practices in the 19th century. Manure from horses in London streets was swept up and sold to farms as fertiliser; the resulting product probably included street detritus such as broken pottery and clay pipe stems. Spreading the manure on a field could have resulted in the even distribution of finds seen in Latimer Field.

In 2019 a magnetometry and resistance survey was performed in the southeast quadrant, in preparation for a planned excavation of the site. The survey located both the inner and outer ditches, and a linear feature that was considered to be the remains of a palisade that ran between the two circuits. As with the 2007 survey of the northeast quadrant, multiple possible pits were identified. These were more frequent in the southern part of the survey area. The survey was limited by the presence of a metal fence which caused magnetic interference, and by the dry soil, which reduced the sensitivity of the resistance measurements. The results were used to select an area for excavation, and a more detailed resistance study was conducted on the area of the planned trench, without finding new features.

The site was excavated in 2019 by a team led by Carter. The main goals of the excavation were to prove that Freston was a causewayed enclosure, and to obtain material that could be used for radiocarbon dating. Since causewayed enclosures often have high densities of deposits at the ends of their ditches, the area of excavation was chosen to overlap a causeway in Latimer Field, so that the trench exposed the adjacent ditch termini for both the inner and outer circuit of ditches.

All four ditch termini (F1 to F4 in the diagram) were found where the cropmarks suggested they would be. The lowest layers in F1 and F2 (the termini of the inner circuit) contained clear evidence of deliberate deposits, including semi-complete pots. In F1's case, it was apparent that material had been placed in the ditch very soon after it had been dug. F4, one of the termini of the outer ditches, was partially excavated, but there was not enough time to go down past the upper layers. F11, a narrow feature in between F2 and F4, was thought to be part of the palisade trench. Four pits, labelled F5, F6, F8 and F15, were excavated; the two smallest (F8 and F15) might have been postholes, but there was not enough context to be sure of this. A ditch discovered at the south end of the trench had been identified on the geophysical survey, which showed that it ran for 70 m (230 ft). F14 was dug as a cross-section across this ditch, which runs north-to-south at that point. The ditch probably predated the causewayed enclosure and may have been dug next to a long barrow, a form of Neolithic burial mound. Several other features in the trench were either determined to be natural or could not be definitely identified as man-made.

Features identified in the 2019 trench
| # | Feature |
|---|---|
| 1–4 | Termini of the inner and outer ditches of the enclosure |
| 5, 6, 8 & 15 | Approximately circular pits |
| 9 & 10 | Irregular pits |
| 11 | Palisade trench |
| 12 & 13 | Natural features |
| 14 | Possible ditch adjacent to a burial mound |

=== Finds from 2019 excavation ===
Both F1 and F2, the inner ditch termini, were over two metres deep, and in both cases the upper half contained few finds, and probably consisted of soil that had washed into the ditches after the enclosure was abandoned. The lower half of each ditch was rich in finds.

The excavation produced 14.5 kg (32 lb) of pottery sherds, mostly from the enclosure ditches. Assessed as a ratio of finds to the length of the excavated ditch sections, this is higher than at the other causewayed enclosures in East Anglia that have been investigated: St. Osyth, Haddenham, and Kingsborough. The pottery finds included Mildenhall ware, a form of Neolithic pottery found in southern England that dates from the mid-fourth millennium BC. Flint finds mostly came from F1 and F2. Debris from knapping and retouching was plentiful, indicating that the flint tools were produced on-site, though some of this activity might have predated the construction of the enclosure. Most of the tools were blades, but four arrowheads were found, along with some other forms such as scrapers and piercers. Charcoal fragments were recovered, mostly from F5, one of the pits, but also from the other circular pits. The palisade trench F11, identified next to F2, contained oak charcoal, and it is possible that the palisade was made of oak. F15 may have been a posthole supporting one of the palisade timbers. Other plant remains included hazelnut shells and a smaller quantity of cereal grains; this is a common pattern in British Neolithic sites, but it is also possible that the acidic soil destroyed more of the grains. No animal or human bones were found, probably because of the high acidity of the soil.

== Sources ==
- Andersen, Niels H. (2019) [2015]. "Causewayed enclosures in northern and western Europe". In Fowler, Chris; Harding, Jan; Hofmann, Daniela (eds.). The Oxford Handbook of Neolithic Europe. Oxford: Oxford University Press. pp. 795–812. ISBN 978-0-19-883249-2.
- Benfield, S. (June 2011). "The prehistoric pottery". In Wightman, Adam (June 2011). Report on the archaeological monitoring of EDF cable undergrounding within the Freston causewayed enclosure at Potash Farm, Holbrook, Suffolk (PDF) (Report). Colchester Archaeological Trust.
- Carter, Tristan; Aubert, Deanna (2021). "Of manuring and monuments: New work around the Freston causewayed enclosure" (PDF). Proceedings of the Suffolk Institute of Archaeology & History. 45 (1): 3–18. ISSN 0262-6004 – via Suffolk Institute.
- Carter, Tristan; Jackson, Nathaniel; Moir, Rose; Allen, Peter; Burningham, Helene; Contreras, Daniel; Schofield, Time; Tipping, Richard (2022). "The Freston causewayed enclosure, Suffolk: Initial insight and hypothetical history". In Last, Jonathan (ed.). Marking Place: New perspectives on early Neolithic enclosures. Oxford: Oxbow. pp. 81–102. ISBN 978-1-78925-709-0. JSTOR j.ctv22fqbzs.10.
- Carter, Tristan; Jackson, Nathaniel; Moir, Rose; Challinor, Dana; Diffey, Charlotte (2021). "The Freston causewayed enclosure: new research on the Early Neolithic of Eastern England (Suffolk)". Documenta Praehistorica. XLVIII: 118–141. doi:10.4312/dp.48.6. ISSN 1854-2492.
- Cunnington, M. E. (1912). "Knap Hill Camp". Wiltshire Archaeological and Natural History Magazine. 37: 42–65. ISSN 0262-6608.
- Curwen, E. Cecil (1930). "Neolithic camps". Antiquity. 4 (13): 22–54. doi:10.1017/S0003598X00004178. ISSN 0003-598X. S2CID 246055035. Archived from the original on 9 November 2020.
- Dyer, Carolyn (1995). A Causewayed Enclosure at Freston, Suffolk, TM 16803795 (Report). Royal Commission on the Historical Monuments of England – via Historic England.
- Gibson, Alex (2002). Prehistoric Pottery in Britain & Ireland. Stroud, UK: Tempus. ISBN 0-7524-1930-7.
- Gibson, Alex; Woods, Ann (1997) [1990]. Prehistoric Pottery for the Archaeologist (2nd ed.). London: Leicester University Press. ISBN 0-7185-1954-X.
- Hegarty, Cain; Newsome, Sarah (13 October 2017). The Archaeology of the Suffolk Coast and Inter-tidal Zone (Report). Bury St Edmunds, UK: Suffolk County Council.
- Martin, Louise (August 2007). Freston Causewayed Enclosure, Suffolk: Report on Geophysical Survey, August 2007 (Report). Swindon, UK: English Heritage.
- Martingell, Hazel. (June 2011). "The worked flint report". In Wightman, Adam (June 2011). Report on the archaeological monitoring of EDF cable undergrounding within the Freston causewayed enclosure at Potash Farm, Holbrook, Suffolk (PDF) (Report). Colchester Archaeological Trust.
- Oswald, Alastair; Dyer, Carolyn; Barber, Martin (2001). The Creation of Monuments: Neolithic Causewayed Enclosures in the British Isles. Swindon, UK: English Heritage. ISBN 1-873592-42-6.
- Palmer, R. (1976). "Interrupted ditch enclosures in Britain: the use of aerial photography for comparative studies". Proceedings of the Prehistoric Society. 42: 161–186. doi:10.1017/S0079497X00010732. ISSN 0079-497X.
- Renfrew, Colin; Bahn, Paul (2015) [2007]. Archaeology Essentials (3rd ed.). London: Thames & Hudson. ISBN 978-0-500-29159-7.
- Schofield, Tim; Carter, Tristan; Jackson, Nathaniel; Moir, Rose (January 2021). "Integrating geophysical survey and excavation at the Freston Early Neolithic causewayed enclosure, Suffolk (UK)". Archaeological Prospection. 28 (1): 3–18. Bibcode:2021ArchP..28..107S. doi:10.1002/arp.1800. ISSN 1075-2196.
- Whittle, Alasdair; Bayliss, Alex; Healy, Frances (2022). "A decade on: Revised timings for causewayed enclosures in Southern Britain". In Last, Jonathan (ed.). Marking Place: New perspectives on early Neolithic enclosures. Oxford: Oxbow. pp. 203–222. ISBN 978-1-78925-709-0.
- Whittle, Alasdair; Healy, Frances; Bayliss, Alex (2015) [2011]. "Gathering time: causewayed enclosures and the early Neolithic of southern Britain and Ireland". In Whittle, Alasdair; Healy, Frances; Bayliss, Alex (eds.). Gathering Time: Dating the Early Neolithic Enclosures of Southern Britain and Ireland. Oxford: Oxbow. pp. 1–16. ISBN 978-1-84217-425-8.
- Wightman, Adam (June 2011). Report on the archaeological monitoring of EDF cable undergrounding within the Freston causewayed enclosure at Potash Farm, Holbrook, Suffolk (PDF) (Report). Colchester Archaeological Trust.
- Wilson, D. R. (1975). "'Causewayed camps' and 'interrupted ditch systems'". Antiquity. 49 (195): 178–186. doi:10.1017/S0003598X00070046. ISSN 0003-598X.
