= Barkhale Camp =

Prehistoric site in West Sussex, England

- Location within West Sussex
- 50°54′17″N 0°36′49″W
- Type: Causewayed enclosure
- Periods: Neolithic
- Location: near Arundel, West Sussex
- OS grid reference: SU 976 126

Scheduled monument
- Designated: 7 April 1967
- Reference no.: 1007880

Barkhale Camp is a Neolithic-era causewayed enclosure, an archaeological site on Bignor Hill, on the South Downs in West Sussex, England. Causewayed enclosures were built in England from shortly before 3700 BC until at least 3500 BC; they are characterized by the full or partial enclosure of an area with ditches that are interrupted by gaps, or causeways. Their purpose is not known; they may have been settlements, meeting places, or ritual sites. The Barkhale Camp enclosure was first identified in 1929, by John Ryle, and was surveyed the following year by E. Cecil Curwen, who listed it as a possible Neolithic site in a 1930 paper which was the first attempt to list all the causewayed enclosures in England.

A small trench was dug in 1930 by Ryle, and a more extensive excavation was undertaken by Veronica Seton-Williams between 1958 and 1961, which confirmed Curwen's survey and found a characteristically Neolithic assemblage of flints. Peter Leach conducted another excavation before the southern part of the site was cleared of trees in 1978, examining several mounds within the enclosure, and attempting to determine the line of the ditch and bank along the southern boundary. No material suitable for radiocarbon dating was recovered, which meant that dating the site was not possible with any precision, but Leach suggested that the site had been constructed in the earlier Neolithic, between 4000 BC and 3300 BC.

The site is owned by the National Trust. It has been protected as a scheduled monument since 1967.

== Background ==
Barkhale Camp is a causewayed enclosure, a form of earthwork that was built in northwestern Europe, including the southern British Isles, in the early Neolithic. Causewayed enclosures are areas that are fully or partially enclosed by ditches interrupted by gaps, or causeways, of unexcavated ground, often with earthworks and palisades in some combination. The use to which these enclosures were put has long been a matter of debate. The causeways are difficult to explain in military terms since they would have provided multiple ways for attackers to pass through the ditches to the inside of the camp, though it was suggested they could have been sally ports for defenders to emerge from and attack a besieging force. Evidence of attacks at some sites provided support for the idea that the enclosures were fortified settlements. (Note: For example, there is evidence that both Crickley Hill and Hambledon Hill were attacked.) They may have been seasonal meeting places, used for trading cattle or other goods such as pottery. There is also evidence that they played a role in funeral rites: material such as food, pottery, and human remains was deliberately deposited in the ditches. The construction of these enclosures took only a short time, which implies significant organization since substantial labour would have been required for clearing the land, preparing trees for use as posts or palisades, and digging the ditches.

Over seventy causewayed enclosures have been identified in the British Isles, and they are one of the most common types of an early Neolithic site in western Europe. About a thousand are known in all. They began to appear at different times in different parts of Europe: dates range from before 4000 BC in northern France, to shortly before 3000 BC in northern Germany, Denmark, and Poland. The enclosures in southern Britain began to appear shortly before 3700 BC, and continued to be built for at least 200 years; in a few cases, they continued to be used as late as 3300 to 3200 BC.

== Site ==
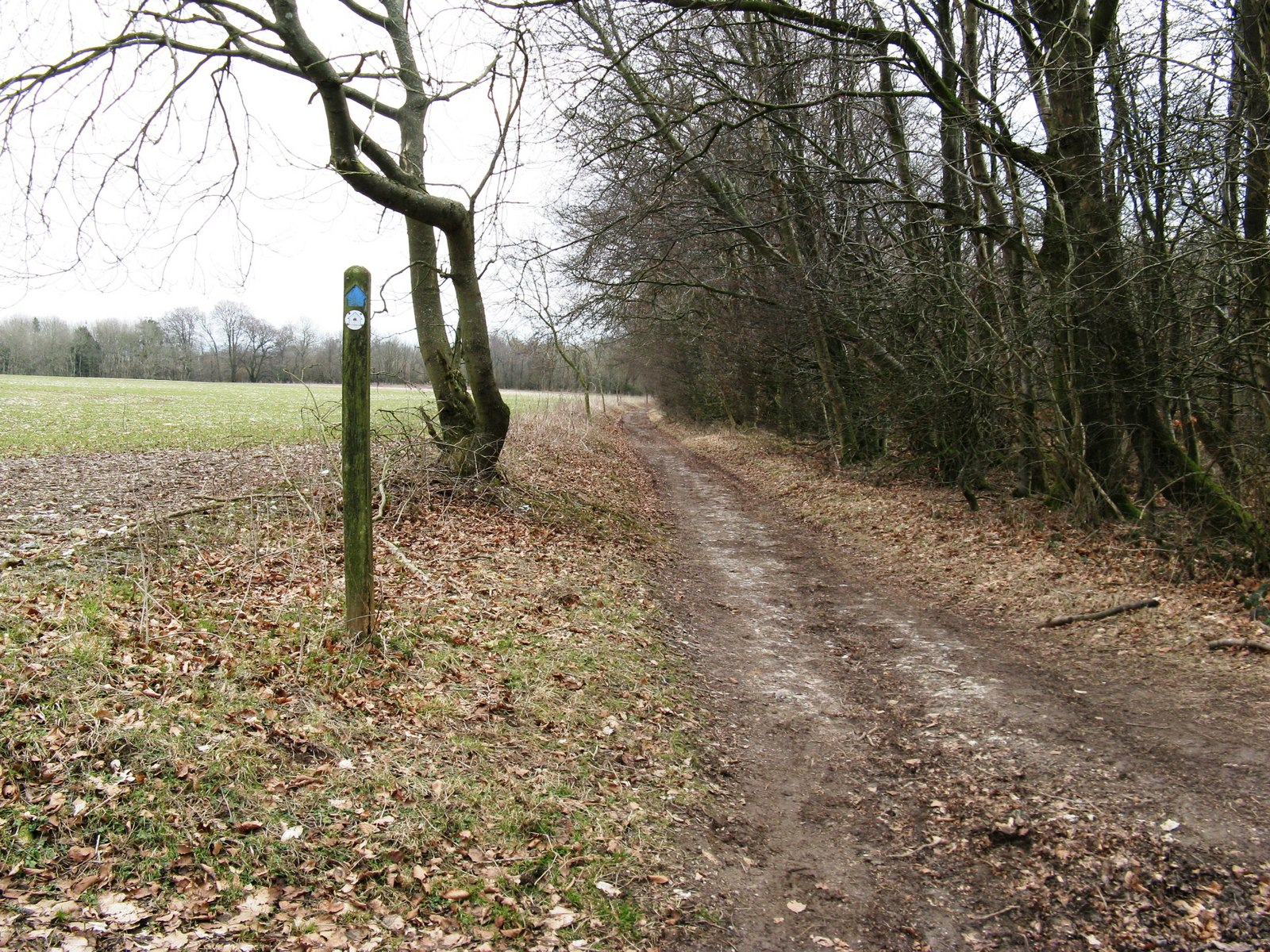
Path crossing Barkhale Camp

The site, which is a scheduled monument, lies on the South Downs, four miles to the northwest of Arundel, in West Sussex; it lies on Bignor Hill, on a slope facing to the south. The enclosure is oval, with thirteen segments of ditch and bank, separated by causeways, all to the north of a trackway passing through the site, which probably dates to the early 19th century. At the time of the survey that identified the ditches in 1930 the area to the south of the track was too overgrown to investigate, though it has since been cleared by the National Trust, the site owner. The site has been severely damaged by ploughing, and the banks are now no more than 0.5 metres (1 ft 8 in) high, but the outlines of the ditches and causeways have not been completely obliterated. The boundary encloses an area of 2.8 hectares (6.9 acres): a 2001 review of the areas enclosed by causewayed sites found three distinct groups of sizes, and Barkhale Camp lies in the middle group, which ranges from 1.4 to 5.5 hectares (3 to 10 acres).

Causewayed enclosures can be broadly grouped by the physical landscapes in which they lie. Many upland enclosures appear to be placed so they can be easily seen from the surrounding countryside, but Barkhale Camp is less visible than most of the nearby causewayed enclosures because it occupies a spur of ground which makes it invisible from the north, and because the shape of the hillside obscures it from lower ground to the south. It may have been intended to be seen from the higher ground nearby.

There are two round bowl barrows to the north of the site, which are thought to date to the Bronze Age.

== Archaeological investigations ==
=== Ryle and Curwen, 1929–1930, and Curwen, 1936 ===
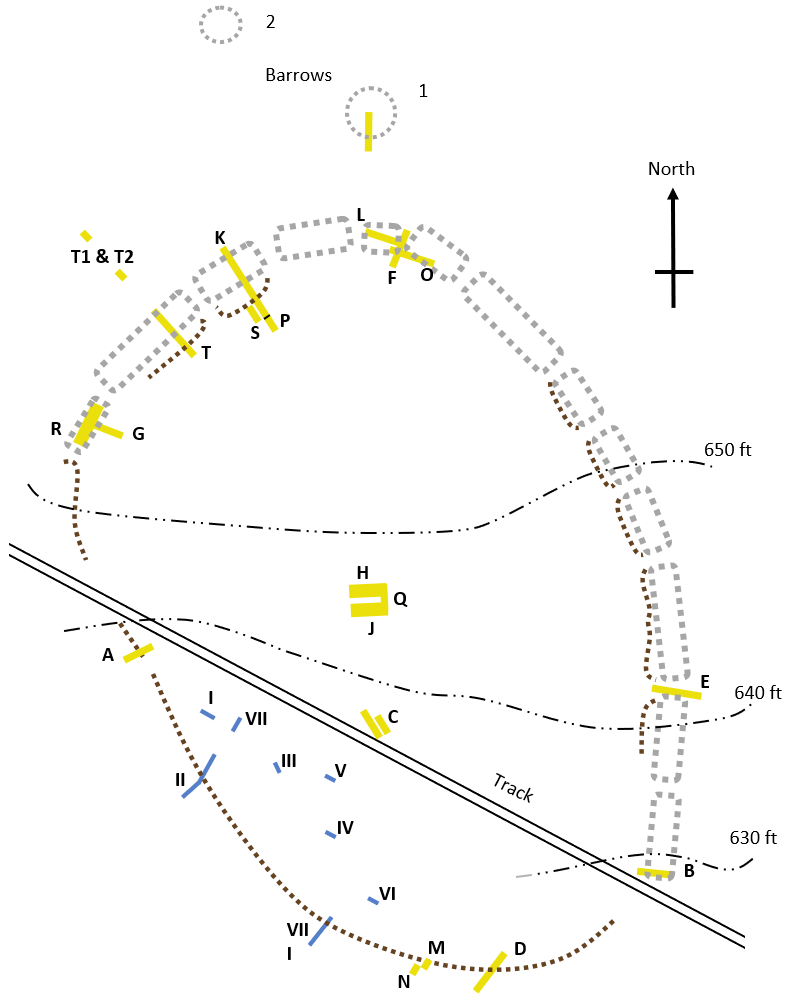
Plan of Barkhale Camp showing location of excavations. Seton-Williams' trenches in 1958–1961 are in yellow, labelled with letters A to T, and Leach's trenches in 1978 are in blue, with numerals I through VIII. Grey outlines are ditch segments identified by Curwen; brown dotted lines are earth banks.

In 1929, John Ryle noticed the earthworks at the site. The northern part was surveyed in 1930 by E. Cecil Curwen and G.P. Burstow, who identified an interrupted ditch, using an earth auger and a boser—a tool for detecting underground bedrock, or the lack of it, by listening to the sound made when a heavy rammer strikes the ground. It was not possible to examine the southern part of the site as it was heavily overgrown with heather, bracken, and thorn. Curwen located thirteen ditch segments north of the track that passes through the site.

Curwen included Barkhale Camp in a list of possible causewayed enclosures in 1930, but noted that it was so overgrown that an excavation was needed. Ryle dug a trench in 1930, but the only information about his work that survives is that it was dug "diagonally across one of the ditches" and that "no worked flints, no pottery, no bones or shells were found". One of the trenches subsequently dug by Veronica Seton-Williams (trench K on the plan at right) found signs of modern excavation, and this may be where Ryle's trench was placed.

In 1936 Curwen's father, Eliot Curwen, published a paper on flint arrowheads in Sussex, and reported the discovery of "a large broad arrow-head with one side convex like a leaf and the other angular like a lozenge-shaped point", found inside the Barkhale Camp enclosure.

=== Seton-Williams, 1958–1961 ===
In 1958 Veronica Seton-Williams began a series of excavations at Barkhale Camp, using the digs as a way to train extra-mural students from London University. The digs lasted for four seasons; she did not publish her work, but her unpublished records were assembled by John Clipson in 1976 as an M.A. thesis. Clipson's thesis was used as a source in a review of the site's history by Peter Leach, in 1983.

Seton-Williams excavated six of the thirteen ditch segments that Curwen had identified by bosing, and found no errors in Curwen's plan. The ditches were as drawn on the plan; the bank had been almost completely ploughed away. In trenches K and T the remains of the bank could be seen, with a height of 0.6 metres (2 ft 0 in), and a width of 6.0 metres (20 ft), though the ploughing is likely to have spread out the bank material. Leach concludes that the height was unlikely to have ever exceeded 1.5 metres (5 ft). The causeways between the ditches were found to have a layer of flint and clay on top of the chalk; Leach suggests that this was to improve the surface since these were accessways into the site. Additional trenches were dug beyond the limit of Curwen's survey: trench A, which was in an area that may have been damaged by ploughing, produced no evidence of a bank or ditch; trench D was in an area disturbed by tree roots, and only a tentative identification of the bank and ditch was possible.

The four seasons of excavation yielded about 200 sherds of pottery. The depth of the finds could not be treated as a reliable indicator of date, since there was evidence that sherds had moved significantly after deposition. For instance in trench R, two sherds that could be joined, showing that they both came from the same pot, were found separated by a vertical distance of 0.62 metres (2 ft 0 in). The majority of the finds were dated to the Bronze Age or later, but a few Neolithic pieces could be identified, including two pieces that were similar to bowl sherds found at Whitehawk Camp, another Neolithic causewayed enclosure in Sussex. Some of the Bronze Age finds were identified as possibly having come from a bucket urn and a collared urn. (Note: Bucket urns are straight-sided vessels with flat bases; collared urns have a heavy rim around the opening, like a collar.) Some Iron Age sherds and a couple of Romano-British and post-Roman sherds were also found.

The flint finds included scrapers, points, and blades, and the assemblage is typical of an early Neolithic site. Few of the flints were found in clearly stratified contexts, but overall the finds support the Neolithic date assigned to the enclosure.

=== Leach, 1978 ===
By 1978 Barkhale Camp was owned by the National Trust, which decided to clear the trees from the area south of the track, and asked the Sussex Archaeological Field Unit to excavate the site before the clearance work began. The excavation took place in September 1978 and was directed by Peter Leach. Leach investigated several mounds within the enclosure, and attempted to determine the line of the enclosing bank in the southern part of the site. The mounds, and one hollow that was also excavated, were found to be recent. Two trenches were dug across the line of the enclosure boundary, finding the ditch to be about 3 metres (10 ft) wide and over 1 metre (3 ft 3 in) deep. The infill appeared to be the result of natural silting.

Flints were found in the mound and ditch trenches, and some were also found on the surface of the site. Most of the struck flint found was waste material; the rest included scrapers, cores, and some retouched flakes. Trench V produced 44 fire-cracked flints, probably of modern date. A dozen sherds of Neolithic pottery were found, all from trench VIII, and an Iron Age sherd was found in trench II. A fragment of Roman Samian ware was found in trench III. Trench II, through the enclosure ditch, was examined for land snails, since the relative frequency of species which live only in shade and those that live in open country can indicate whether the ditch was dug in woodland or in land that had already been cleared. Very few snail shells were found, making it impossible to draw definite conclusions, but it was notable that all the species found were shade-loving, and the assemblage was similar to that found at Offham, another causewayed enclosure. K. D. Thomas, who analyzed the molluscs found at Barkhale, suggested that it was possible that the site had been constructed at a time when the area was covered by woods, but that an alternative interpretation was that the snail shells found represented only species that had lived in the ditches, which had not accumulated shells from surrounding open countryside. No material suitable for radiocarbon dating was recovered, which meant that dating the site was not possible with any precision, but Leach suggested that the similarities between Barkhale and other sites which had been dated implied a date in the earlier Neolithic, between 4000 BC and 3300 BC.

=== RCHME, 1995, and Gathering Time, 2011 ===
The Royal Commission on the Historical Monuments of England (RCHME) included Barkhale Camp in a 1995 survey of multiple sites. The resulting report reviewed the finds from the excavations, and suggested that Barkhale Camp was never permanently occupied. The RCHME report also commented on the history of the two barrows: in 1934 Leslie Grinsell noted that both had been damaged, presumably by antiquarians or looters, and by 1962 ploughing had levelled the hollows from the damage noted by Grinsell. Most of the sherds found by Seton-Williams in the trench through one of the barrows could not be dated, but the ones from lower in the section were thought to be prehistoric.

Gathering Time was a project funded by English Heritage and the Arts and Humanities Research Council to reanalyze the radiocarbon dates of nearly 40 causewayed enclosures, using Bayesian analysis. The authors, Alasdair Whittle, Frances Healy, and Alex Bayliss, published the results in 2011. Barkhale Camp was included in the project, but the acidic soil meant that no bone survived, and no suitable material could be found for sampling.

== Sources ==
- Andersen, Niels H. (2019) [2015]. "Causewayed Enclosures in Northern and Western Europe". In Fowler, Chris; Harding, Jan; Hofmann, Daniela (eds.). The Oxford Handbook of Neolithic Europe. Oxford: Oxford University Press. pp. 795–812. ISBN 978-0-19-883249-2.
- Cartwright, Caroline; Leach, Peter E. (1983a). "The flint industry". In Leach, P. E. (1983). "The Excavation of a Neolithic Causewayed Enclosure on Barkhale Down, Bignor Hill, West Sussex" (PDF). Sussex Archaeological Collections. 121: 11–30. doi:10.5284/1085500. ISSN 0143-8204.
- Cartwright, Caroline; Leach, Peter E. (1983b). "Pottery". In Leach, P. E. (1983). "The Excavation of a Neolithic Causewayed Enclosure on Barkhale Down, Bignor Hill, West Sussex" (PDF). Sussex Archaeological Collections. 121: 11–30. doi:10.5284/1085500. ISSN 0143-8204.
- Clipson, J. (1983). "Flints". In Leach, P. E. (1983). "The Excavation of a Neolithic Causewayed Enclosure on Barkhale Down, Bignor Hill, West Sussex" (PDF). Sussex Archaeological Collections. 121: 11–30. doi:10.5284/1085500. ISSN 0143-8204.
- Cunnington, M. E. (1912). "Knap Hill Camp". Wiltshire Archaeological and Natural History Magazine. 37: 42–65. ISSN 0262-6608.
- Curwen, E. Cecil (1930). "Neolithic camps". Antiquity. 4 (13): 22–54. doi:10.1017/S0003598X00004178. S2CID 246055035. Archived from the original on 9 November 2020.
- Curwen, Eliot (1936). "On Sussex Flint Arrow-Heads" (PDF). Sussex Archaeological Collections. 77: 15–25. doi:10.5284/1085525. ISSN 0143-8204.
- Gibson, Alex; Woods, Ann (1997) [1990]. Prehistoric Pottery for the Archaeologist (2nd ed.). London: Leicester University Press. ISBN 0-7185-1954-X.
- Healy, Frances; Bayliss, Alex; Whittle, Alasdair (2015) [2011]. "Sussex". In Whittle, Alasdair; Healy, Frances; Bayliss, Alex (eds.). Gathering Time: Dating the Early Neolithic Enclosures of Southern Britain and Ireland. Oxford: Oxbow. pp. 207–262. ISBN 978-1-84217-425-8.
- Leach, P. E. (1983). "The Excavation of a Neolithic Causewayed Enclosure on Barkhale Down, Bignor Hill, West Sussex" (PDF). Sussex Archaeological Collections. 121: 11–30. doi:10.5284/1085500. ISSN 0143-8204.
- Oswald, Alastair; Dyer, Carolyn (December 1995). Barkhale Camp, Arundel, West Sussex (Report). RCHME.
- Oswald, Alastair; Dyer, Carolyn; Barber, Martin (2001). The Creation of Monuments: Neolithic Causewayed Enclosures in the British Isles. Swindon, UK: English Heritage. ISBN 1-873592-42-6.
- Sheridan, Alison (22 February 2012). "Book Review Alasdair Whittle, Frances Healy & Alex Bayliss. Gathering time: dating the Early Neolithic enclosures of southern Britain and Ireland". Antiquity (331): 262–264. doi:10.1017/S0003598X00062670. S2CID 163744148. Archived from the original on 18 January 2022.
- Smith, I. F. (1983). "Pottery". In Leach, P. E. (1983). "The Excavation of a Neolithic Causewayed Enclosure on Barkhale Down, Bignor Hill, West Sussex" (PDF). Sussex Archaeological Collections. 121: 11–30. doi:10.5284/1085500. ISSN 0143-8204.
- Thomas, K. D. (1983). "Mollusc analysis of samples from the ditch-fill of trench II". In Leach, P. E. (1983). "The Excavation of a Neolithic Causewayed Enclosure on Barkhale Down, Bignor Hill, West Sussex" (PDF). Sussex Archaeological Collections. 121: 11–30. doi:10.5284/1085500. ISSN 0143-8204.
- Whittle, Alasdair; Healy, Frances; Bayliss, Alex (2015) [2011]. "Gathering time: causewayed enclosures and the early Neolithic of southern Britain and Ireland". In Whittle, Alasdair; Healy, Frances; Bayliss, Alex (eds.). Gathering Time: Dating the Early Neolithic Enclosures of Southern Britain and Ireland. Oxford: Oxbow. pp. 1–16. ISBN 978-1-84217-425-8.
