= Great Wilbraham causewayed enclosure =

Prehistoric site in Cambridgeshire, England

Great Wilbraham
- Location of Great Wilbraham
- 52°11′49″N 00°15′04″E
- Location: Cambridgeshire, England
- OS grid reference: TL53955780

History
- Built: Neolithic

Site notes
- Area: 2 ha (4.9 acres)

Scheduled monument
- Official name: Causewayed enclosure 900m west of Great Wilbraham parish church
- Designated: 5 January 1976
- Reference no.: 1009103

Great Wilbraham is a Neolithic causewayed enclosure, an archaeological site near the village of Great Wilbraham in Cambridgeshire, England. The enclosure is about 170 metres (560 ft) across, and covers about 2 hectares (4.9 acres). Causewayed enclosures were built in England from shortly before 3700 BC until at least 3500 BC; they are characterized by the full or partial enclosure of an area with ditches that are interrupted by gaps, or causeways. Their purpose is not known; they may have been settlements, meeting places, or ritual sites.

The Great Wilbraham enclosure was first identified from aerial photographs in 1972. An excavation was begun in 1975 by David Clarke, with a planned five-year research programme, but Clarke died in 1976 and the results from the dig remained unpublished for years. The surviving part of the archive of finds and records from Clarke's dig was reanalysed in the 2000s, and published in 2006. The site was rich in finds, including Neolithic flint, pottery from periods stretching from the Neolithic to the present day, and animal bone—mostly cattle, but also some sheep and pig. Radiocarbon dating of two samples from the enclosure found dates inconsistent with their context, and were assumed to be the result of later material intruding into the Neolithic levels. The site has been protected as a scheduled monument since 1976.

== Background ==
Great Wilbraham is a causewayed enclosure, a form of earthwork that was built in northwestern Europe, including the southern British Isles, in the early Neolithic period. Causewayed enclosures are areas that are fully or partially ringed by ditches interrupted by gaps, or causeways, of unexcavated ground, often with earthworks and palisades in some combination. The site's excavator, David Clarke, considered that it was probably a settlement, but the function of causewayed enclosures in general is debated. The causeways are difficult to explain in military terms since they would have provided multiple ways for attackers to pass through the ditches to the inside of the enclosure, though it was suggested they could have been sally ports for defenders to emerge from and attack a besieging force. Evidence of attacks at some sites provided support for the idea that the enclosures were fortified settlements. (Note: For example, there is evidence that both Crickley Hill and Hambledon Hill were attacked.) They may have been seasonal meeting places, used for trading cattle or other goods such as pottery.

There is also evidence that they played a role in funeral rites: material such as food, pottery, and human remains was deliberately deposited in the ditches. The construction of these enclosures would have required substantial labour for clearing the land, preparing trees for use as posts or palisades, and digging the ditches, and would probably have been planned for some time in advance, as they were built in a single operation.

Over seventy causewayed enclosures have been identified in the British Isles, and they are one of the most common types of an early Neolithic site in Western Europe. About a thousand are known in all. They began to appear at different times in different parts of Europe: dates range from before 4000 BC in northern France, to shortly before 3000 BC in northern Germany, Denmark, and Poland. The enclosures began to appear in southern Britain shortly before 3700 BC, and continued to be built for at least 200 years; in a few cases, they continued to be used as late as 3300 to 3200 BC.

== Site ==
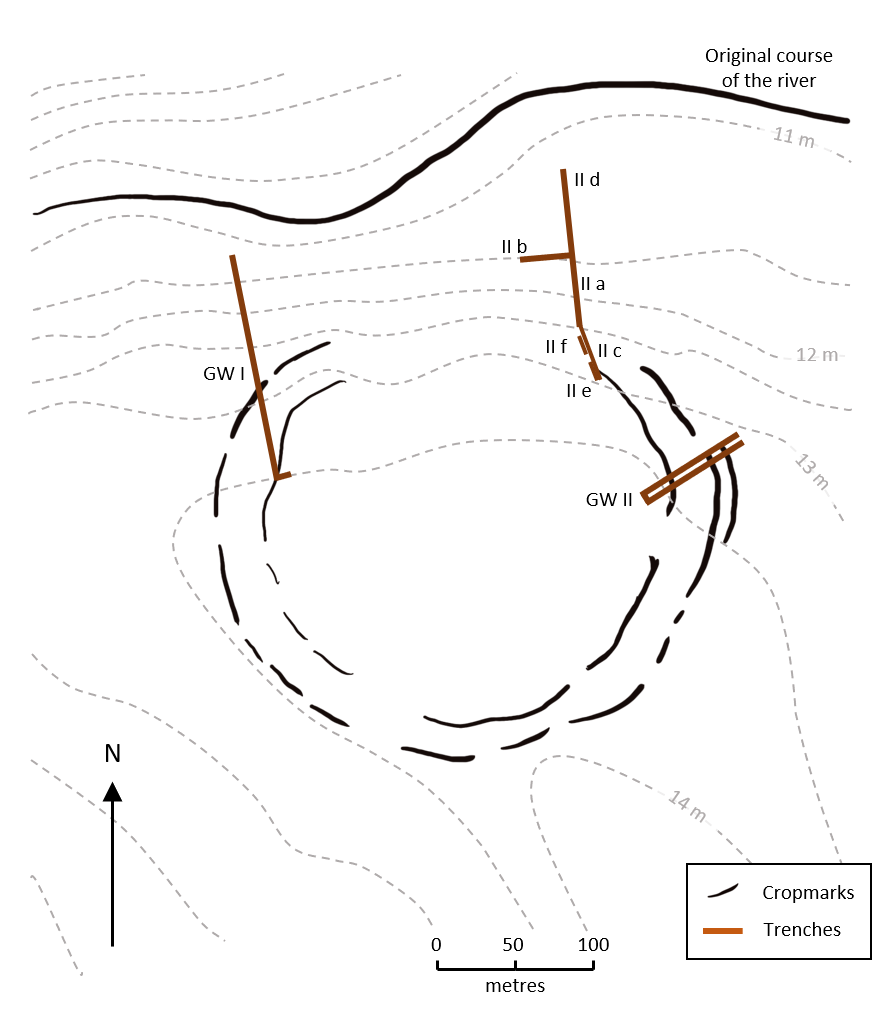
Map of the causewayed enclosure, showing the former path of the river, and the location of the excavation trenches

The Great Wilbraham enclosure is in Cambridgeshire, in the valley of the Little Wilbraham River, near the village of Great Wilbraham, east of Cambridge. Two concentric ditches, about 20 metres (66 ft) apart, each interrupted by multiple gaps, lie on a flat area on the north-facing side of the river valley, though the river has been diverted and no longer runs on its former path. The site is about 170 metres (560 ft) across, and encloses about 2 hectares (4.9 acres). Most causewayed enclosures are oval-shaped, but the two circuits at Great Wilbraham are almost perfectly circular, though many of the ditch sections (between the gaps) are themselves straight lines. Many enclosures were built on valley floors, usually positioned not far above the high water mark of the river, and Great Wilbraham fits this pattern. The site is slightly sloped towards the old river course, with the upper edge of the site at the edge of the higher ground. The enclosure is located on a sandy terrace, in Little Wilbraham Fen, a small fenland area connected to the larger Fens to the north by a stream.

Great Wilbraham was identified by J. K. St Joseph, who ran the aerial photography program at Cambridge University for many years, from cropmarks (Note: A cropmark is an area of a field in which the crops grow differently, because of differences in the soil beneath them. This can indicate the presence of a ditch cut in the bedrock, beneath the soil.) on an aerial photograph taken in July 1972, and included on a list of sixteen possible causewayed enclosures based on observed cropmarks published in 1975. The site was listed as a scheduled monument in 1976.

A prehistoric henge was tentatively identified in an adjacent field in the 1970s, but a more recent review considered it to be a naturally disturbed area of gravel.

== Archaeological investigations ==
=== Clarke, Alexander & Kinnes, 1975–1976 ===
David Clarke was one of the leading figures in New Archaeology, a heterogeneous movement to bring archaeology closer to the natural sciences, and conduct archaeological excavations in a scientific manner. He had some experience of fieldwork, but had not directed an excavation until 1975, when he started a five-year project to investigate the Great Wilbraham site. John Alexander, the other leader of the project, was a very experienced excavator, and joined Clarke on the project after the plan included using it as a training ground for students.

Great Wilbraham had several advantages as a project from Clarke's point of view: it was close to Cambridge, where he worked; it was expected to be rich in Neolithic material, which was the recent focus of Clarke's teaching work; and it was planned as a way to put into practice some of the theoretical ideas he had propounded during the previous decade. Great Wilbraham was the only known causewayed enclosure to include peat deposits, and Clarke hoped that Neolithic wood might be found as a result, since peat is one of the few natural environments in which wood can be preserved. According to a later review, the excavation "was intended to be an experiment in what Clarke called total archaeology" (italics in the original). "Total archaeology" is an approach which attempts to integrate information from "all of the disciplines capable of bringing understanding" to a site; accordingly, Clarke planned to include interdisciplinary analyses and an evaluation of the surrounding landscape and environment in the project.

A grant from the British Museum funded two weeks of excavation in September 1975; (Note: Evans quotes the two-week excavation period from Clarke and Alexander's project documents, but says elsewhere that there were three weeks of excavation in 1975.) the prospect of finding preserved organic material was the reason for the museum's interest, and the grant came from money allocated for purchasing artefacts for their collections. Clarke assumed that the site was a settlement, despite the uncertainty about the function of causewayed enclosures, and did not mention the possibility of ritual uses in an application he made to the British Museum for funding for the 1976 season. Clarke died unexpectedly in the summer of 1976. He and Alexander never published their work, but the British Museum grant proposal records some of the details of the two weeks. A magnetometer survey was performed, and fieldwalking to recover surface finds, and a trench 80 by 2 m (262 by 7 ft) (GW I in the diagram) was excavated. Finds mentioned in the proposal included bones of cattle, sheep, pig, deer and wolf; worked wood; seeds; pottery sherds; and flints. A pollen column was taken—a column of soil, from a hole bored at the site, examined for changes in the frequency of pollen species, with each stratum of soil corresponding to a different period in the past. (Note: Pollen analysis can identify changes in vegetation over time, such as the appearance of weeds known to be associated with the cultivation of grains, which indicates the presence of agriculture. Pollen changes can sometimes be correlated with known climatic changes, allowing it to be used for dating.) The column covered 5000 years of the peat, and demonstrated changes in the environment over the life of the site, such as the clearance of the site in Neolithic times and later pasture development. Two more trenches were dug the following year, directed by Alexander and Ian Kinnes.

Clarke's long-term plan for the site was ambitious, and could not have been achieved with the money requested in his proposal; a later review of the project identified shortcomings in the plan and execution as well. Excavation proceeded by horizontal spits (layers of fixed depth), rather than the accepted method of stratigraphic excavation (removing the material in each identifiable layer of soil as a unit). Although excavation by spits is considered an unsound approach, the work was in other ways advanced for its time: for example, a computer program was written to render the contour topography of the site in a 3D perspective.

==== Reanalysis by Evans et al. 2006 ====
Some of the material from Clarke and Alexander's two seasons of excavation was preserved in an archive, which was stored in Cambridge and London. In 2006, the archive (less than half of which could be located by that time) was reviewed by a group led by Christopher Evans, a Cambridge University archaeologist, resulting in a paper that presented the results of the original dig, as well as a review of Clarke's ideas and how they were implemented in the field.

The cropmark plot used by Clarke to determine where to dig the trenches proved to be inaccurate, and this meant the trenches were not ideally positioned. The first trench (GW I in the diagram) was intended to be bisected by the circuit's ditch, but only just overlapped it at the southern end. The plot of the cropmarks was altered, probably by Clarke, to allow for the new information, but it was still incorrect in the east, and the trench in the northeast of the site, dug in 1976, was started (as trenches GW II a & d) further outside the line of the circuit than was expected, and the trench had to be extended (GW II c, e, & f) before the ditch was encountered. In both seasons this led to more investigation of the fenland peat deposits and less of the interior of the enclosure. The trench at the east side of the site (GW II in the diagram) was U-shaped, with two 45 m-long (148 ft) arms, connected at the southwestern end.

For all three trenches, the initial soil removal was done by machine until the base of the ploughsoil was reached, and the spoil heaps were examined for finds. Recording of finds below this level was poor within the trenches and inconsistent between them, so it was not always possible for the later analysis to be sure of the original stratigraphic position of the finds.

=== Findings ===
Two radiocarbon dates were obtained at the time of Clarke's investigation: an oak sample from the peat to the north of the enclosure was dated at 410–190 BC, and a sample of the peat itself to 7000 BC. Evans obtained two more dates from the outer ditch, submitting samples from the archive. A charred seed gave a date after 1950 AD, and was assumed to have been a later intrusion; the other, a charcoal fragment, was dated to 1750–1520 BC, in the Bronze Age. This is significantly later than the known dates for causewayed enclosures, and was also considered to be intrusive; these dates did not alter the conclusion that the enclosure was of mid-4th millennium BC date. In 2011, Great Wilbraham was included in Gathering Time, a project to reanalyse the radiocarbon dates of nearly 40 causewayed enclosures, but no further samples could be found from the excavations that were suitable for radiocarbon dating. The magnetometry survey performed for the 2006 reanalysis recorded evidence of the Neolithic ditches, along with many traces of later activity.

Fieldwalking recovered nearly 900 pieces of worked flint, and the various trenches brought the total to over 4,200. Items included a flint axe (which had been lost by the time the archive was reviewed in 2006), scrapers, blades, arrowheads, and hammerstones. The earliest estimated date was for a retouched blade which may have been from the Upper Palaeolithic (from about 40,000 to about 12,000 years ago). Other material came from many different periods, including some from as late as the first millennium BC. The majority of the flints came from gravel sources, and it is likely that the site's location was chosen by its Neolithic occupants because of the ready availability of flints from the nearby river-gravel terrace. A few artefacts made from non-local stone were identified, including fragments of stone axes from Cornwall (greenstone) and Cumberland (volcanic tuff). (Note: In the typology of Neolithic axes, the Cornish axes were Group I, and the Cumbrian axes were Group VI, or Langdale axes.) There was evidence to show that flints had been worked on site, rather than having been knapped elsewhere and brought to the area of the enclosure, but it appeared that the earliest stages of work on the flints had been done elsewhere, perhaps on the gravel terrace closer to the river, rather than near where the ditches were dug.

Of the 2,590 pottery sherds found, nearly half were Mildenhall ware, a form of Neolithic pottery found in southern England that dates from the mid-fourth millennium BC. The sherds were stored in the 1970s in labeled envelopes, identified by spit depth, trench, and grid square; since the excavation was by spits this meant that each envelope could contain material from more than one stratigraphic layer. The upper four layers included some Mildenhall material, but also pottery from the Late Bronze Age through to the present-day. All layers below this, which were all probably from within the various prehistoric ditches, contained Neolithic pieces, with a few Iron Age and Roman fragments. The outermost ditch found in trench GW II contained Roman material in all layers, indicating that this ditch dated from the Romano-British era (the mid-first century to the early fifth century AD).

Most of the animal bones from the Neolithic levels of the excavation were from cattle, with a few bones from sheep and pigs, and a single bone each from red deer, dog and horse. The cattle were probably killed on site as the finds included bones from every part of the skeleton. Clarke's proposal to the British Museum after the first year's excavation had mentioned finding a wolf bone, but in the reanalysis the only canid mentioned was a dog. A dog was apparently present at the enclosure during the Neolithic occupation, as one of the cattle bones showed clear signs of gnawing. An analysis of snail shells taken from the Neolithic levels found 36 Cepea nemoralis shells, most of which had visible bands. The banded form of this species is thought to be more common in grassland than woodland, implying that the area around the site had been cleared at the time the shells were deposited in the ditches. It may also be that the banded form was becoming more common over time during the Neolithic, and if this is the case the Great Wilbraham data would be anomalous, as more of the banded forms were found there than at other sites of a similar age.

Multiple cores were taken to the north of the site. Pollen analysis showed a change from a landscape dominated by pine to a grassland environment. Radiocarbon dates were obtained on organic material from the boreholes. The lowest (and hence oldest) sample, from the peat, was dated to 7940–7580 BC, a period in the early Mesolithic when birch and pine predominated. The upper sample was dated to 2440–2030 BC, at the boundary between the Neolithic and the Bronze Age, when woodland was declining and being replaced by agricultural land. The pollen spectra from these samples were in agreement with the expected environmental conditions for these dates.

The later review of the records from the 1970s concluded that both the ditches in GW I had been backfilled and recut, and that the dig had not found evidence of a bank associated with the ditch. Overall the site was found to be remarkably rich in finds, in comparison to the results of excavations at similar Neolithic enclosures.

== Sources ==
- Andersen, Niels H. (2019) [2015]. "Causewayed Enclosures in Northern and Western Europe". In Fowler, Chris; Harding, Jan; Hofmann, Daniela (eds.). The Oxford Handbook of Neolithic Europe. Oxford: Oxford University Press. pp. 795–812. ISBN 978-0-19-883249-2.
- Bray, Peter; Frieman, Catherine (2008). "Archaeological Techniques". In Adkins, Roy; Adkins, Lesley; Leitch, Victoria (eds.). The Handbook of British Archaeology. London: Constable. pp. 356–404. ISBN 978-1-84529-606-3.
- Cunnington, M. E. (1912). "Knap Hill Camp". Wiltshire Archaeological and Natural History Magazine. 37: 42–65. ISSN 0262-6608.
- Curwen, E. Cecil (1930). "Neolithic camps". Antiquity. 4 (13): 22–54. doi:10.1017/S0003598X00004178. S2CID 246055035. Archived from the original on 9 November 2020.
- de la Bédoyère, Guy (2010). Roman Britain: A New History. New York: Thames & Hudson. ISBN 978-0-500-28748-4.
- Drewett, Peter (2011). Field Archaeology: An Introduction (2nd ed.). Abingdon, UK: Routledge. ISBN 978-0-415-55119-9.
- Edmonds, Mark (2006). "The Lithics". In Evans, Christopher; Edmonds, Mark; Boreham, Steve (2006). "'Total Archaeology' and Model Landscapes: Excavation of the Great Wilbraham Causewayed Enclosure, Cambridgeshire, 1975–76". Proceedings of the Prehistoric Society. 72: 113–162. doi:10.1017/S0079497X00000803.
- Evans, Christopher; Edmonds, Mark; Boreham, Steve (2006). "'Total Archaeology' and Model Landscapes: Excavation of the Great Wilbraham Causewayed Enclosure, Cambridgeshire, 1975–76". Proceedings of the Prehistoric Society. 72: 113–162. doi:10.1017/S0079497X00000803.
- Evans, John G. (2006). "Molluscs". In Evans, Christopher; Edmonds, Mark; Boreham, Steve (2006). "'Total Archaeology' and Model Landscapes: Excavation of the Great Wilbraham Causewayed Enclosure, Cambridgeshire, 1975–76". Proceedings of the Prehistoric Society. 72: 113–162. doi:10.1017/S0079497X00000803.
- Gibson, Alex (2002). Prehistoric Pottery in Britain & Ireland. Stroud, UK: Tempus. ISBN 0-7524-1930-7.
- Gibson, Alex; Woods, Ann (1997) [1990]. Prehistoric Pottery for the Archaeologist (2nd ed.). London: Leicester University Press. ISBN 0-7185-1954-X.
- Gojda, Martin (2008). "Landscape Archaeology". In Hardesty, Donald H. (ed.). Archaeology: Volume 1. Singapore: Constable. pp. 198–226. ISBN 978-1-84529-606-3.
- Hammond, Norman (30 December 1975). "Archaeology report: Cambridge: Neolithic 'causewayed camp'". The Times. London. p. 10.
- Hammond, Norman (13 July 1976). "Obituary: Dr David Clarke: Distinguished archaeologist". The Times. London. p. 16.
- Healy, Frances; Bayliss, Alex; Whittle, Alasdair; Pryor, Francis; French, Charles; Allen, Michael J.; Evans, Christopher; Edmonds, Mark; Meadows, John; Hey, Gill (2015) [2011]. "Eastern England". In Whittle, Alasdair; Healy, Frances; Bayliss, Alex (eds.). Gathering Time: Dating the Early Neolithic Enclosures of Southern Britain and Ireland. Oxford: Oxbow. pp. 263–347. ISBN 978-1-84217-425-8.
- Johnson, Matthew (2010) [1999]. Archaeological Theory: An Introduction (2nd ed.). Chichester, UK: Blackwell. ISBN 978-1-4051-0014-4.
- Knight, Mark (2006). "Prehistoric pottery". In Evans, Christopher; Edmonds, Mark; Boreham, Steve (2006). "'Total Archaeology' and Model Landscapes: Excavation of the Great Wilbraham Causewayed Enclosure, Cambridgeshire, 1975–76". Proceedings of the Prehistoric Society. 72: 113–162. doi:10.1017/S0079497X00000803.
- Legge, Tony (2006). "Animal bone". In Evans, Christopher; Edmonds, Mark; Boreham, Steve (2006). "'Total Archaeology' and Model Landscapes: Excavation of the Great Wilbraham Causewayed Enclosure, Cambridgeshire, 1975–76". Proceedings of the Prehistoric Society. 72: 113–162. doi:10.1017/S0079497X00000803.
- Oswald, Alastair; Dyer, Carolyn; Barber, Martin (2001). The Creation of Monuments: Neolithic Causewayed Enclosures in the British Isles. Swindon, UK: English Heritage. ISBN 1-873592-42-6.
- Palmer, R. (1976). "Interrupted ditch enclosures in Britain: the use of aerial photography for comparative studies". Proceedings of the Prehistoric Society. 42: 161–186. doi:10.1017/S0079497X00010732.
- Pettit, Paul; White, Mark (2012). The British Palaeolithic: Human Societies at the Edge of the Pleistocene World. Abingdon, UK: Routledge. ISBN 978-0-415-67455-3.
- Schauer, Peter; Bevan, Andrew; Shennan, Stephen; Edinborough, Kevan; Kerig, Tim; Pearson, Mike Parker (2020). "British Neolithic Axehead Distributions and Their Implications". Journal of Archaeological Method and Theory. 27 (4): 836–859. doi:10.1007/s10816-019-09438-6.
- Taylor, Maisie (1996). "Wood". In Fagan, Brian M. (ed.). The Oxford Companion to Archaeology. Oxford University Press. pp. 758–760. ISBN 978-0-19-507618-9.
- Taylor, Sally (2017). "Journeys to Neolithic Langdale: how a Cumbrian landscape may help explain prehistoric movement of polished stone axes" (PDF). Lithics–The Journal of the Lithic Studies Society. 37: 15–32.
- Whittle, Alasdair; Healy, Frances; Bayliss, Alex (2015) [2011]. "Gathering time: causewayed enclosures and the early Neolithic of southern Britain and Ireland". In Whittle, Alasdair; Healy, Frances; Bayliss, Alex (eds.). Gathering Time: Dating the Early Neolithic Enclosures of Southern Britain and Ireland. Oxford: Oxbow. pp. 1–16. ISBN 978-1-84217-425-8.
- Wilson, D. R. (1975). "'Causewayed camps' and 'interrupted ditch systems'". Antiquity. 49 (195): 178–186. doi:10.1017/S0003598X00070046.
