= Court Hill (West Sussex) =

Hill and archaeological site in the UK

Court Hill is a causewayed enclosure in West Sussex. Causewayed enclosures were built in England from shortly before 3700 BC until about 3300 BC; they are characterized by the full or partial enclosure of an area with ditches that are interrupted by gaps, or causeways. Their purpose is not known; they may have been settlements, meeting places, or ritual sites.

The site was identified as of possible archaeological interest in 1951, and was excavated in 1982 by Owen Bedwin. It was confirmed to be a causewayed enclosure by Bedwin, and has since been dated to the fourth millennium BC by radiocarbon dating.

== Background ==
Court Hill is a causewayed enclosure, a form of earthwork that was built in northwestern Europe, including the southern British Isles, in the early Neolithic. Causewayed enclosures are areas that are fully or partially enclosed by ditches interrupted by gaps, or causeways, of unexcavated ground, often with earthworks and palisades in some combination. The use to which these enclosures were put has long been a matter of debate. The causeways are difficult to explain in military terms since they would have provided multiple ways for attackers to pass through the ditches to the inside of the camp, though it was suggested they could have been sally ports for defenders to emerge from and attack a besieging force. Evidence of attacks at some sites provided support for the idea that the enclosures were fortified settlements. (Note: For example, there is evidence that both Crickley Hill and Hambledon Hill were attacked.) They may have been seasonal meeting places, used for trading cattle or other goods such as pottery. There is also evidence that they played a role in funeral rites: material such as food, pottery, and human remains was deliberately deposited in the ditches. The construction of these enclosures took only a short time, which implies significant organization since substantial labour would have been required, for clearing the land, preparing trees for use as posts or palisades, and digging the ditches.

Over seventy causewayed enclosures have been identified in the British Isles, and they are one of the most common types of an early Neolithic site in western Europe. About a thousand are known in all. They began to appear at different times in different parts of Europe: dates range from before 4000 BC in northern France, to shortly before 3000 BC in northern Germany, Denmark, and Poland. The enclosures in southern Britain began to appear shortly before 3700 BC, and continued to be built for at least 200 years; in a few cases, they continued to be used as late as 3300 to 3200 BC.

== Site ==
The site lies at the southwest end of a wooded ridge, near the village of East Dean. The enclosure is about 175 metres across. The enclosure is shaped like an irregular rectangle with rounded corners, and is defined by a ditch with a bank inside it. The bank has been levelled by ploughing and is no longer visible; the ditch is still visible within the wooded area in the northeastern part of the enclosure. There is also a crescent-shaped earthwork to the north of the enclosure, also now levelled by the plough.

== Archaeological investigations ==
The curator of the Sussex Archaeological Society, N. E. S. Norris, was the first to notice the possibility of a prehistoric site on Court Hill, after studying aerial photographs of the area. Norris initially thought the site might be an Iron Age hillfort. E. W. Holden visited the site in April 1951, and returned with G. P. Burstow for another examination, finding about 40 potsherds. Burstow suggested these were Late Bronze Age rather than Early Iron Age. They also found many potboilers, including "one concentration 6 ft. square [about 2 metres square], where there must be many hundreds". There were also three barrows visible.

== Sources ==
- Andersen, Niels H. (2019) [2015]. "Causewayed Enclosures in Northern and Western Europe". In Fowler, Chris; Harding, Jan; Hofmann, Daniela (eds.). The Oxford Handbook of Neolithic Europe. Oxford: Oxford University Press. pp. 795–812. ISBN 978-0-19-883249-2.
- Cunnington, M.E. (1912). "Knap Hill Camp". Wiltshire Archaeological and Natural History Magazine. 37: 42–65. ISSN 0262-6608.
- Bedwin, Owen (1984). "The Excavation of a Small Hilltop Enclosure on Court Hill, Singleton, West Sussex, 1982" (PDF). Sussex Archaeological Collections. 122: 13–22. doi:10.5284/1085512. ISSN 0143-8204.
- Healy, Frances; Bayliss, Alex; Whittle, Alasdair (2015) [2011]. "Sussex". In Whittle, Alasdair; Healy, Frances; Bayliss, Alex (eds.). Gathering Time: Dating the Early Neolithic Enclosures of Southern Britain and Ireland. Oxford: Oxbow. pp. 207–262. ISBN 978-1-84217-425-8.
- Holden, E.W. (1951). "Earthworks on Court Hill". Sussex Notes and Queries. 13: 183–185.
- Oswald, Alastair (2018). Causewayed Enclosures: Introductions to Heritage Assets (Report). Archived from the original on 18 March 2022.
- Oswald, Alastair; Dyer, Carolyn; Barber, Martin (2001). The Creation of Monuments: Neolithic Causewayed Enclosures in the British Isles. Swindon, UK: English Heritage. ISBN 1-873592-42-6.
- Whittle, Alasdair; Healy, Frances; Bayliss, Alex (2015) [2011]. "Gathering time: causewayed enclosures and the early Neolithic of southern Britain and Ireland". In Whittle, Alasdair; Healy, Frances; Bayliss, Alex (eds.). Gathering Time: Dating the Early Neolithic Enclosures of Southern Britain and Ireland. Oxford: Oxbow. pp. 1–16. ISBN 978-1-84217-425-8.
