= Court Hill (disambiguation) =

Court Hill is a Site of Special Scientific Interest near Clevedon, Somerset, UK

Court Hill may also refer to:

- Court Hill Historic District, Iowa, U.S.
- Court Hill (Sussex), an archaeological site in West Sussex, UK

== See also ==
- Moot hill, historic mound where court cases might have been settled
- Courthouse Hill Historic District, Wisconsin, U.S.
