= Bignor Hill =

South down

Coordinates: 50.909968°N 0.604246°W

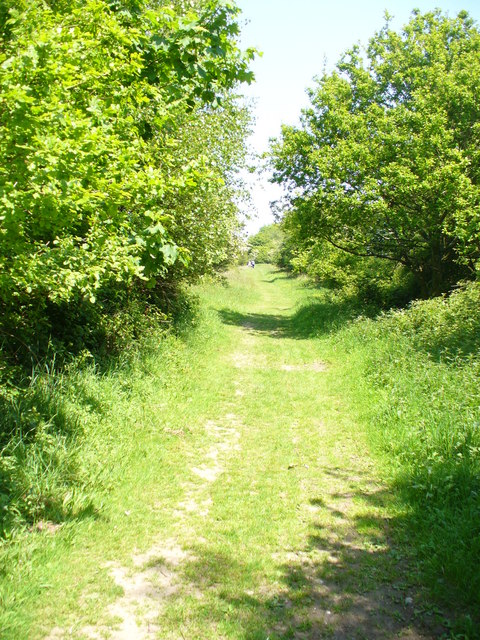
Stane Street runs up the hill.

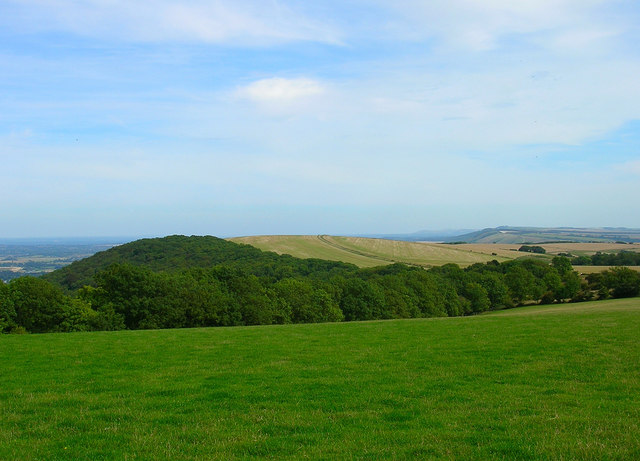
As seen from Glatting Beacon.

Bignor Hill is a hill near Bignor in Sussex. The South Downs Way passes over the hill. Near the summit are the remains of a memorial to Toby Wentworth-Fitzwilliam, the secretary of the Cowdray Hounds; this is called Toby's Stone. There is an old Celtic legend that a dragon had its lair on top of the hill and its remains can be seen in the folds of the ground. The Roman road of Stane Street runs by the hill.

Barkhale Camp, a Neolithic causewayed enclosure, is on a southern slope of the hill. The hill is also home to a bowl barrow which is a rare intact example. Both are scheduled ancient monuments.

The hill is part of the Slindon Estate, and is managed by the National Trust. The Hill is a rare habitat of Chalk heathland.
