= Veronica Seton-Williams =

Australian anthropologist and archaeologist (1910–1992)

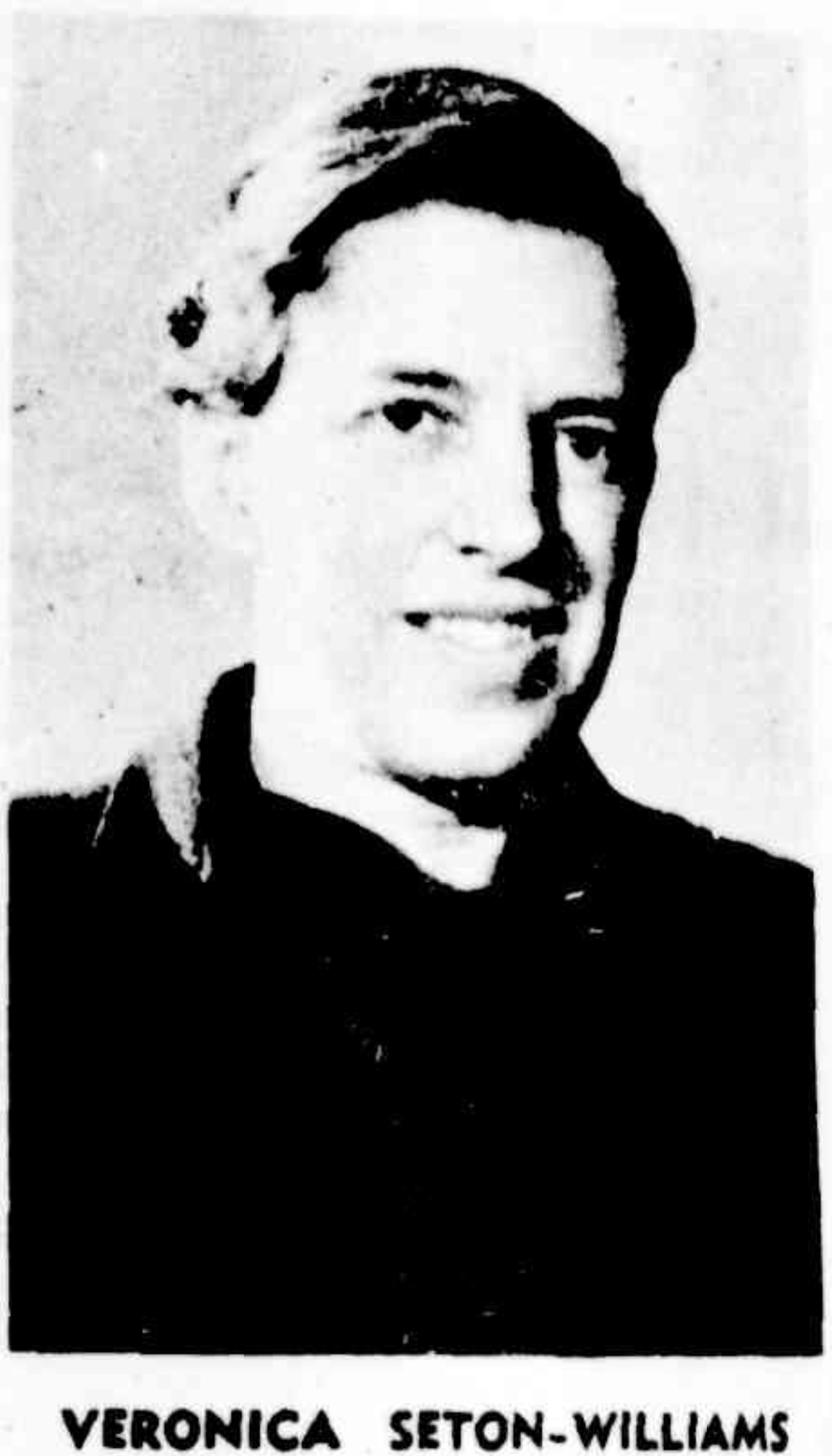
- Born: Marjory Veronica Seton-Williams; 20 April 1910; Melbourne, Australia
- Died: 29 May 1992 (aged 82); St Helier, Jersey
- Known for: Excavations at Barkhale Camp, Buto, Sheikh es-Zuweid, Jericho, Mersin, Maiden Castle, Dorset
- Scientific career
- Fields: archaeologist

Veronica Seton-Williams (20 April 1910 – 29 May 1992) FSA, was a British-Australian archaeologist who excavated in Egypt and the Near East, as well as in Britain. She studied history and political science at the University of Melbourne and then Egyptology and prehistory at University College London.

== Early life and education ==
Marjory Veronica Seton-Williams was born in Melbourne, Australia, the daughter of Seton Gordon Nixon Williams (1856–1927), a lawyer, and Eliza Mary (Ellie) Staughton (1875–1947). As a child she was taught to hunt, and made money selling rabbit pelts. She also learned Judo, which she said came in handy later in life when she was working in the Middle East. Her maternal grandfather was Samuel Staughton.

She was educated at home until 1925 when she attended Clyde Girls Grammar School. In 1934, she graduated from the University of Melbourne with an undergraduate degree in history and political science. One of her professors in Ancient History was Jessie Webb, who provided her with letters of introduction to leading British classicists when she moved to London to further her studies.

== Career ==
In 1934, she moved to England to study under Mortimer Wheeler at the Institute of Archaeology, University College London. She initially enrolled for a degree in Egyptology, under professor Stephen Glanville, but was persuaded to read British prehistory instead. During that time she excavated at Maiden Castle, Dorset (1934–1936) with Wheeler, and went on to excavate at Sheikh es-Zuweid at the Sinai Peninsula (1935–1936) with Flinders Petrie, in Palestine and Turkey (1936–1937) with John Garstang, and Tell el-Duweir (1937–1938). She also worked with E. Cecil Curwen on the 1935 excavation of Whitehawk Camp, in Brighton.

She learned to speak Arabic in order to supervise Arab workmen on dig sites. Riots and civil disturbances sometimes disrupted the work and one of her fellow archaeologists, James Starkey, was shot dead.

=== World War II service ===
During the Second World War, she worked as an ambulance driver and in the Postal Censorship Department and in the British Council's Ministry of Information.

=== Post war career ===
In 1949, Seton-Williams worked on renewed excavations at Sakçe Gözü, in Turkey, a site previously excavated by John Garstang. In 1956,1960 and 1964, she excavated at Tell Rifa'at in Syria. In 1964, she was appointed field director of the Egypt Exploration Society's excavations at Buto (1964–1968), where she worked alongside Dorothy Charlesworth who became field director in 1969.

She completed her PhD on Syrian Archaeology in 1957. Among her associates in Europe were her cousin Joan Richmond and the archaeologists Nancy and Hallam Movius.

Between 1958 and 1961, she led excavations at Barkhale Camp in Sussex, using the digs as training for extramural students from London University.

Seton-Williams taught Egyptian and Mesopotamian archaeology for 25 years at the University of London, during which time she frequently collaborated with colleagues Joan du Plat Taylor and John Waechter on field projects in Cyprus, Syria and Turkey. She also taught Egyptology at the City Literary Institute. She continued to teach until 1977.

== Death ==
She was living in Balsham, Cambridgeshire when she died on 29 May 1992.

== Published works ==
She published in English and French.

=== Books ===
- Britain and the Arab States; a survey of Anglo-Arab relations, 1920-1948. London: Luzac, 1948.
- Ptolemaic Temples. Cambridge: The Author, 1977.
- Le Tresor de Toutankhamon, la fombe dans la Vallee des rois. Paris: Editions Princesse, 1979.
- Swan‘s 600-mile Nile cruise handbook. 10th ed. London: Swan (Hellenic), 1980.
- Les Tresors de Babylone. Paris: Editions Princesse, 1981.
- Blue Guide to Egypt, with Peter Stocks. London: Benn, 1983.
- El-Amarna. London: Privately published by the author, 1984.
- Egyptian Poems. London: Merlin Books, 1987.
- Egyptian legends and Stories. London: The Rubicon Press, 1988.
- The Road to El-Aguzein: BlueGuide to Egypt. 2nd ed. London/New York: Kegan Paul International, 1988.
- A Short History of Egypt. London: The Rubicon Press, 1989.
- Greek Poems. London: Merlin Books, 1991.
- Greek Legends and Stories. London: Rubicon, 1993.

=== Journal articles ===
- Third Report on the Excavations at Sakje-Genzi, 1908-1911. with John Garstang and W.J. Phythian-Adams. (1937) Annals of Archaeology and Anthropology. University of Liverpool. XXIV, 119–140.
- Excavations at the Wadi Dhobai, 1937/38. with J. d' A. Waechter. (1938) Journal of the Palestine Oriental Society. 18,172-85.
- Neolithic Burnished Wares in the Near East. (1948) Iraq. 10, 34–50.
- Palestinian Temples. (1949) Iraq. 11, 79–89.
- The Excavations at Sakce Gozu. with J. du Plat Taylor and J. Waechter. (1950) Iraq. 12, 53–138.
- Painted Pottery of the Second Millennium from Southern Turkey and Northern Syria. (1953) Iraq. 15, 57–68.
- Report on the Cilicean Survey. (1954) Journal for Anatolian Studies. 4, 121–174.
- Preliminary Report on the Excavations at Tell Rifa'at. (1961) Iraq. 23, 68–87.
- The Tell El-Fara'in Expedition, 1964-1965. (1965) Journal of Egyptian Archaeology. 51, 9–15.
- The Town of the Cobra Goddess of Lower Egypt. (1966) Archaeology. 19, 208–13.
- The Tell el-Fara'in Expedition, 1966. (1966) Journal of Egyptian Archaeology. 52, 163–171.
- The Tell el-Fara'in Expedition. (1966) Journal of Egyptian Archaeology. 53, 146–155.
- The Excavation at Tell Rifa'at: Second Preliminary Report. (1967) Iraq. 29, 16–33.
- The Tell El-Fara'in Expedition (1968) Journal of Egyptian Archaeology. 55, 5-22.
- Review of Treasures of the Cairo Museum by Edward L. B. Terrace and Henry G. Fischer. (1971) The Antiquaries Journal LI, 1971. London: 1970, 338–339.
- Review of Egypt and the East Mediterranean World, 2200 to 1900 B.C. by William A. Ward. (1974) The Antiquaries Journal, LIV, 1974. Beirut: 1971, 316.
- Review of Principles of Egyptian Art by Heinrich Schafer. (1978) The Antiquaries Journal, LVIII. English Edition, Oxford 1974, 175.

== Sources ==
- Curwen, E.C. (1936). "Excavations in Whitehawk Camp, Brighton, Third Season, 1935". Sussex Archaeological Collections. 77: 60–92. doi:10.5284/1085805.
- Leach, P.E. (1983). "The Excavation of a Neolithic Causewayed Enclosure on Barkhale Down, Bignor Hill, West Sussex". Sussex Archaeological Collections. 121: 11–30. doi:10.5284/1085500. ISSN 0143-8204.
