= Hadrian Allcroft =

Classicist

Arthur Hadrian Allcroft (1865 – 18 December 1929) was a British classical scholar. He was born in Ashby in Lincolnshire, and attended Magnus Grammar School and Exeter Grammar School before studying at Christ Church, Oxford. His B.A. was in Classics and Greats. He was the author of Earthwork of England (1908), about prehistoric, Roman, Saxon, Danish, Norman and medieval earthworks. It was described by E. Cecil Curwen as "a standard work of reference".

Allcroft also wrote the two-volume The Circle and the Cross. A Study in Continuity, published in 1927. It is a scholarly contribution to the history of religion and symbolism, and well illustrated with black and white photographs. His thesis is a continuity from pagan religious traditions to Christianity. Specifically, he argues that the circle is a symbol commonly found in pre-Christian religions and was incorporated into Christian symbolism through the use of the cross. This affected ritual, art/decoration, and architecture.

Other books included Downland Pathways (1924), about the Sussex Downs, and Waters of Arun (1930), about the River Arun, the latter being published posthumously. He and his wife both died on the same day, 18 December 1929, from throat infections.

== Sources ==
- Curwen, E. Cecil (1929). "Arthur Hadrian Allcroft" (PDF). The Archaeological Journal. 86: 324–325.
