= Bosing (archaeology) =

Acoustic survey method

Bosing is an unsophisticated method for the discovery of buried archaeological features such as pits and ditches dug into a thin substratum of rock, such as limestone or chalk. The technique involves hitting a block of wood laid over the ground surface with a weighty hammer and assessing the sound given out. For example, if the wood gave out a heavy thudding sound, then this would indicate that the underlying bedrock had been disturbed while undisturbed bedrock would emit a thinner and sharper tone. Methodically repeating the process across an area and noting the sound pattern will reveal the extent of the underground features.

== Sources ==
- Darvill, Timothy (2008). The Concise Oxford Dictionary of Archaeology. Oxford. ISBN 978-0-19-953405-0. OCLC 226280264.
