= Frances Healy (archaeologist) =

British archaeologist and historian

Frances Healy FSA

Academic background
- Education: London School of Economics and Political Science; Institute of Archaeology, University of London

Academic work
- Discipline: Archaeology
- Sub-discipline: Prehistory; Neolithic; prehistoric Britain
- Institutions: Norfolk Archaeological Unit; English Heritage; Wessex Archaeology; Oxford Archaeology; Newcastle University; Cardiff University

Frances M. A. Healy FSA is a British archaeologist and historian, specialising in the British Neolithic and lithic technology. She has worked for Norfolk Archaeological Unit, English Heritage, Wessex Archaeology, and Oxford Archaeology. She has been a research associate at Newcastle University and Cardiff University, where she has been an honorary research fellow since 2007.

Healy studied international relations at the London School of Economics and Political Science, graduating with an upper second class honours Bachelor of Science (BSc) degree in 1965. She then undertook a postgraduate diploma in prehistoric archaeology at the Institute of Archaeology, University of London, which she completed in 1967. On a part-time basis she undertook research for a Doctor of Philosophy (PhD) degree at the Institute of Archaeology, which she completed in 1990 with her thesis "The neolithic in Norfolk".

In 1990, Healy was elected a Fellow of the Society of Antiquaries of London (FSA). In 2020, she was awarded the Grahame Clark Medal by the British Academy "for her distinguished achievements involving recent contributions to the study of prehistoric archaeology, with a particular focus on the British Neolithic".

== Selected works ==
- Roger Mercer and Frances Healy, 2008, Hambledon Hill, Dorset, England: Excavation and survey of a Neolithic Monument Complex and its Surrounding Landscape, Volume 1, English Heritage Archaeological Monographs.
- Whittle, Alasdair; Healy, Frances; Bayliss, Alexandra (2011). Gathering time: dating the early Neolithic enclosures of southern Britain and Ireland. Oxford: Oxbow Books. ISBN 9781842174258.
