= Crickley Hill and Barrow Wake =

Site of Special Scientific Interest in Gloucestershire

- Site of Special Scientific Interest
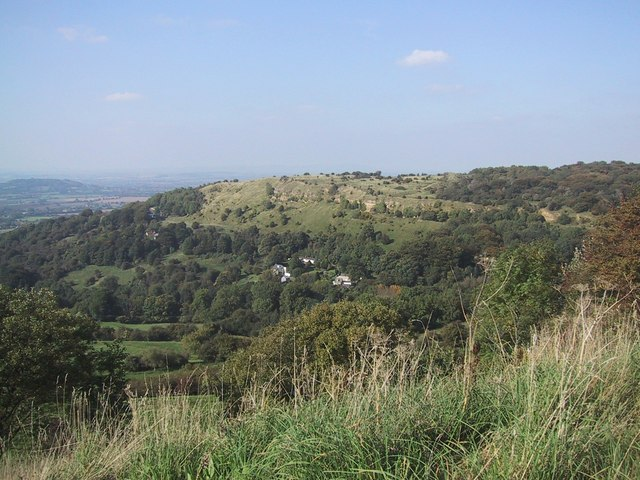
- Looking from Barrow Wake to Crickley Hill

- Location within Gloucestershire
- Location of Crickley Hill and Barrow Wake.
- Area of search: Gloucestershire
- Grid reference: SO929161 & SO931154
- Coordinates: 51.843905°N 2.10374°W
- Interest: Biological/Geological
- Area: 56.8 ha (140 acres)
- Notification date: 1974

Crickley Hill and Barrow Wake (grid reference SO929161 & grid reference SO931154) is a 56.8-hectare (140-acre) biological and geological Site of Special Scientific Interest in Gloucestershire, notified in 1974.

The site (two parts) lies within the Cotswold Area of Outstanding Natural Beauty. It was formerly known as Crickley Hill and includes some of a site known as Tuffleys Quarry. Part of the site is owned and managed by Gloucestershire Willdlife Trust and the National Trust as a nature reserve Park. The Cotswold Way National Trail passes through Crickley Hill and Barrow Wake.

Barrow Wake and Tuffley's Quarry are listed in the 'Cotswold District' Local Plan 2001–2011 (on line) as Key Wildlife Sites. Crickley Hill is listed in the 'Cotswold District' Local Plan 2001–2011 (on line) as an SSSI and Regionally Important Geological Site.

== Location ==
The site lies south of Cheltenham on the Cotswold scarp and it supports a range of habitats characteristic of the Cotswold limestone. It includes species-rich grassland, semi-natural woodland, scrub and particularly nationally important rock exposures.

== Biological interest ==
The site supports several types of grassland and the turf contains many lime-loving herbs. There are several species of orchid recorded such as early purple orchid, bee orchid, and musk orchid. Viper's bugloss flowers in abundance. This diversity supports a varied invertebrate fauna (butterflies, moths and local snails).

The site includes the Scrubbs and Crickley Woods which are areas of mature Beech woodland with regenerating Beech and Ash. Short Wood is an area of Oak parkland.

The scarp slopes provide basking areas for adders.

== Geological interest ==
The rock exposures constitute a key Jurassic locality and show a major section in the Lower Inferior Oolite. There are extensive exposures of Lower and Middle Jurassic rocks and these exhibit the best sections in the Cotswolds in the Pea Grit and the overlying Coral Bed.

Crickley Hill is part of the Cotswold escarpment which runs from Dorset to the Yorkshire Coast. The stone has been quarried for hundreds of years and was probably used for dry stone walling.

== Archaeology ==
There is evidence of settlements over 5,000 years back. As the soil is thin on the hill the evidence lies close to the surface under the grassland. The site has been excavated each summer period from 1969 to 1993 and is considered to be of international importance as a result of the findings. These point to occupation by humans over 4,000 years (Neolithic period) to a post-Roman period. The archaeologists have stayed regularly at Ullenwood Camp close to Crickley Hill for the excavation period.

A late Iron Age cemetery nearby produced the "Birdlip Grave Group", a high status female burial including the bronze Birdlip Mirror.

== Crickley Hill Country Park ==
The Crickley Hill Country Park was established in 1979 with assistance from the then Countryside Commission. Access to the countryside at this park provides limestone grassland; beech woodlands, oak parkland; an archaeological site and panoramic views.

There is a range of self-guided trails with supporting leaflets. These include Hill Fort Trail; Scrubbs Trail; Scarp Trail; Family Trail and Park Trail. There are also circular walks of different lengths (5 and 8.5 miles).

Crickley Hill is wardened by Gloucestershire Wildlife Trust, The National Trust and volunteers from the Cotswold Warden Service.

== Literary associations ==
Crickley Hill was immortalised by Ivor Gurney in his poem of that name (from 1919), recounting how mention and memory of the ridge led to bonding on the Western Front, the hill epitomising in local miniature the England for which they felt they were fighting.

== Archaeological publications ==
- Dixon, Philip, 2019, The Hillfort Settlements, Crickley Hill, Volume 2, with contributions by Alvey, R C, Alvery, M, Badock, A, Elsdon, S, Muir, R, Savage, R D A, Crickley Hill Archaeological Trust.
- Dixon, Philip, 1994, The Hillfort Defences, Crickley Hill, Volume 1, with contributions by Alvey, R C, Elsdon, S, Firman, R, Gelling, M, Haldane, J W, Sturgess, J, Crickley Hill Trust and the Department of Archaeology, University of Nottingham
- Cunliffe B, 1984, Gloucestershire and the Iron Age of Southern Britain, Transactions of the Bristol Gloucestershire Archaeological Society 102:5–15.
- Dixon, P W, 1979, A Neolithic and Iron Age site on a hill top in southern England, Scientific American 241(5):42–50.
- Dixon, P W, 1977, Crickley Hill and Gloucestershire Prehistory, Gloucestershire County Council, Gloucester.

== SSSI Source ==
- Natural England SSSI information on the citation
- Natural England SSSI information on the Crickley Hill And Barrow Wake units
