= Alasdair Whittle =

British archaeologist (born 1949)

Alasdair Whittle FBA FLSW
- Born: Alasdair William Richardson Whittle; 7 May 1949 (age 77)

Academic work
- Discipline: Archaeology
- Sub-discipline: Neolithic Europe
- Doctoral students: Penny Bickle; Vicki Cummings; Susan Greaney

Alasdair William Richardson Whittle, FBA, FLSW (born 7 May 1949) is a British archaeologist and academic, specialising in Neolithic Europe. He was Distinguished Research Professor of Archaeology at Cardiff University from 1997 to 2018.

Whittle was born on 7 May 1949. He studied Literae Humaniores (i.e. classics) at Christ Church, Oxford, graduating with a Bachelor of Arts (BA) degree. He remained at Oxford to study for a Doctor of Philosophy (DPhil) degree, which he completed in 1976 with a thesis titled "The Earlier Neolithic of Southern England and its Continental Contacts".

In 1998, Whittle was elected a Fellow of the British Academy (FBA), the United Kingdom's national academy for the humanities and social sciences. He is also a founding Fellow of the Learned Society of Wales (FLSW).

== Publications ==
- (editor, with Vicki Cummings) Going Over: The Mesolithic-Neolithic Transition in North-West Europe
- Europe in the Neolithic: the creation of new worlds
- The Archaeology of People: Dimensions of Neolithic Life
- Sacred Mound, Holy Ring.
- Problems in Neolithic Archaeology
