= Stuart Piggott =

British archaeologist (1910–1996)

Stuart Piggott CBE FBA FSA FSA Scot
- Born: 28 May 1910; Petersfield, Hampshire, UK
- Died: 23 September 1996 (aged 86); Wantage, Oxfordshire, UK
- Citizenship: British
- Spouse: Peggy Piggott (m. 1936; div. 1956)
- Scientific career
- Fields: Archaeology
- Workplaces: University of Edinburgh

Stuart Ernest Piggott, CBE, FBA, FSA, FRSE, FSA Scot (28 May 1910 – 23 September 1996) was a British archaeologist, best known for his work on prehistoric Wessex.

== Early life ==
Piggott was born in Petersfield, Hampshire, the son of G. H. O. Piggott, and was educated there at Churcher's College.

== Career ==
On leaving school in 1927 Piggott took up a post as assistant at Reading Museum, where he developed an expertise in Neolithic pottery.

In 1928 he joined the Royal Commission on the Ancient and Historical Monuments of Wales and spent the next five years producing a revolutionary study of the site of Butser Hill, near Petersfield. He also worked with Eliot Cecil Curwen on their excavations at The Trundle causewayed enclosure in Sussex.

In the 1930s he began working for Alexander Keiller, an amateur archaeologist who funded his work from the profits of his Dundee Marmalade business. The two dug numerous sites in Wessex including Avebury and Kennet Avenue. In 1933, he joined his friend Grahame Clark in writing the highly significant paper, "The age of the British flint mines" (Antiquity, 1933): the resultant controversy led to the foundation of the Prehistoric Society. Still without any formal archaeological qualification, Piggott enrolled at Mortimer Wheeler's Institute of Archaeology, London, taking his diploma in 1936. It was also here that he met his wife, Peggy (Margaret Guido). In 1937 he published another seminal paper, "The early Bronze Age in Wessex".

With Peggy, he went on in June 1939 to join the burial chamber excavations at Sutton Hoo at the invitation of Charles Phillips.

During the Second World War Piggott worked as an air photo interpreter. He was posted to India, where he spent time studying the archaeology of the sub-continent, eventually leading him to write the books Some Ancient Cities of India (1946) and Prehistoric India (1950). These experiences provided him with a valuable external view of European prehistory, which was to prove useful on his return to Britain.

After the war he went to Oxford to study the work of William Stukeley, but in 1946 was offered the Abercromby Chair of Archaeology at Edinburgh University (now part of the School of History, Classics and Archaeology), in succession to Gordon Childe. Piggott succeeded in making Edinburgh an archaeology department of international standing. He continued to publish widely. His book Neolithic Cultures of the British Isles (1954) was highly influential, until radiocarbon dating tests exposed flaws in its chronology. Piggott considered that radiocarbon dating was "archaeologically unacceptable", because every other shred of evidence pointed towards his dates being correct. Ancient Europe (1965) remained a popular survey of Old World prehistory for more than twenty years, demonstrating his view of the solidarity and continuity of the past in Europe. In 1956 his childless marriage ended.

In 1958 Piggott published a survey of Scottish prehistory, Scotland before History, and in 1959 a popular introductory volume, Approach to Archaeology. He was president of the Prehistoric Society from 1960 to 1963, president of the Society of Antiquaries of Scotland from 1963 to 1967, president of the Council for British Archaeology from 1967 to 1970, and a trustee of the British Museum between 1968 and 1974). In 1963, he produced a thorough analysis of the Beaker culture in Britain, published as part of a Festschrift dedicated to Cyril Fox. Piggott's interest in the early history of the practice of archaeology led to him writing The Druids in 1968; other books included Prehistoric Societies (with Grahame Clark), The Earliest Wheeled Transport (1983), followed by its sequel, Wagon, Chariot and Carriage (1992). His final book was Ancient Britain and the Antiquarian Imagination (1989).

He died of a heart attack at his home near Wantage in Oxfordshire on 23 September 1996. His remains were cremated on 30 September at Oxford crematorium.

== Family ==
On 12 November 1936, he married Cecily Margaret Preston, an archaeologist and finds specialist; they had met while students at the Institute of Archaeology in London. By 1954, their relationship was over, and they divorced in 1956. She became better known under her second married name, Margaret Guido.

== Excavations ==
Sites he excavated (often with Richard Atkinson) included Cairnpapple Hill in West Lothian; Wayland's Smithy in Oxfordshire; and West Kennet Long Barrow and Stonehenge in Wiltshire.

== Honours ==
In 1957 he was elected a Fellow of the Royal Society of Edinburgh. His proposers were Robert Schlapp, David Whitteridge, Sidney Newman, and James Ritchie.

He received the CBE in 1972, and was awarded numerous academic awards from scholarly institutions in Britain and abroad. He retired from the Abercromby Chair in 1977 and was awarded the gold medal of the Society of Antiquaries of London in 1983 and the Grahame Clark Medal of the British Academy in 1992.

== Reception and legacy ==
Vincent Megaw commented that "as [Piggott] himself has said, although he has done his fair share of field work and excavation, his prime concern has been to produce works of synthesis and interpretation". Megaw added that Piggott viewed "archaeology as an oyster to be savoured whole and not simply to be subjected to the minutiae of macrofaunal and calorific analyses." The historian Ronald Hutton stated that it was "one aspect of his greatness that he fostered the study of early modern antiquaries as an integral part of the self-awareness of his profession."

In 1968 a number of Piggott's former pupils and colleagues assembled a collection of essays dedicated to him, titled Studies in Ancient Europe. In 1976 Megaw published a second Festschrift, which brought in consideration of Piggott's work on the archaeology of Asia and the Americas.

In the 2021 film The Dig, which told the story of the Sutton Hoo excavations, Piggott was portrayed by Ben Chaplin, although the film takes some creative licence with its presentation of his marriage to his wife Peggy.

== Publications ==
Marjorie Robertson compiled a list of Piggott's books up to 1975 for his festschrift.

Year of publication	Title	Co-author(s)	Publisher
1935	The Progress of Early Man	–	A. and C. Black (London)
1944	Some Ancient Cities of India	–	Oxford University Press (Bombay)
1948	Fire Among the Ruins		Oxford University Press (London)
1949	British Prehistory		Oxford University Press (London)
1950	Prehistoric India to 1000 BC		Penguin (Harmondsworth)
1950	William Stukeley: An Eighteenth Century Antiquary		Clarendon Press (Oxford)
1951	Cairnpapple Hill, West Lothian		HMSO (Edinburgh)
1951	A Picture Book of Ancient British Art	Glyn Daniel	Cambridge University Press (Cambridge)
1953	William Camden and the Britannia		Oxford University Press (London)
1954	The Neolithic Cultures of the British Isles		Cambridge University Press (Cambridge)
1958	Inventaria Archaeologica GB 25-34: Early and Middle Bronze Age Grave-Groups and Hoards from Scotland (edited volume)	Margaret Stewart (editors)	Garraway (London)
1958	Scotland Before History		Nelson (London)
1959	Approach to Archaeology		A. and C. Black (London)
1961	The Dawn of Civilization (edited volume)		Thames and Hudson (London)
1962	The Prehistoric Peoples of Scotland (edited volume)		Routledge and Kegan Paul (London)
1962	The West Kennet Long Barrow: Excavations 1955–56		HMSO (London)
1963	West Kennet Long Barrow: Wiltshire		HMSO (London)
1965	Ancient Europe from the Beginnings of Agriculture to Classical Antiquity: A Survey		Edinburgh University Press (Edinburgh)
1965	Prehistoric Societies (The History of Human Society series)	Grahame Clark	Hutchinson (London)
1967	Celts, Saxons and the Early Antiquaries		Edinburgh University Press (Edinburgh)
1968	The Druids (= Ancient Peoples and Places. 63)		Thames and Hudson (London)
1970	Early Celtic Art	Derek Allen	Edinburgh University Press for the Arts Council of Great Britain (Edinburgh)

Further publications include:

1970	Scotland: Illustrated Guide to Ancient Monuments	W. Douglas Simpson	HMSO (Edinburgh)
1978	Antiquity Depicted: Aspects of Archaeological Illustrations (W.Neurath Memorial Lecture)		Thames and Hudson (London)
1983	The Earliest Wheeled Transport. From the Atlantic Coast to the Caspian Sea		Thames and Hudson (London)
1989	Ancient Britons and the Antiquarian Imagination. Ideas from the Renaissance to the Regency		Thames and Hudson (London)
1992	Wagon, Chariot and Carriage. Symbol and Status in the History of Transport		Thames and Hudson (London)
1995	The Celtic World (edited volume, contributed one chapter: 18. Wood and the Wheelwright)	Miranda J. Green (editor)	Routledge (London)

== Sources ==
- Bradley, R. (November 1996). "Obituary: Stuart Piggott". British Archaeology. 19. Archived from the original on 9 February 1999.
- Daniel, Glyn Edmund; Chippindale, Christopher (1989). The Pastmasters: Eleven Modern Pioneers of Archaeology: V. Gordon Childe, Stuart Piggott, Charles Phillips, Christopher Hawkes, Seton Lloyd, Robert J. Braidwood, Gordon R. Willey, C.J. Becker, Sigfried J. De Laet, J. Desmond Clark, D.J. Mulvaney. London: Thames and Hudson. ISBN 9780500050514.
- Hutton, Ronald (2005). "The Religion of William Stukeley". The Antiquaries Journal. 85: 381–394. doi:10.1017/S000358150007445X. S2CID 162733894.
- Megaw, Vincent (1976). "Editorial Preface". In Megaw, J. V. S. (ed.). To Illustrate the Monuments: essays on archaeology presented to Stuart Piggott on the occasion of his sixty-fifth birthday. London: Thames and Hudson. pp. 9–10. ISBN 0500011494.
- Mercer, Roger J. (26 September 1996). "Obituary: Professor Stuart Piggott". The Independent.
- Mercer, Roger J. (2004). "Piggott, Stuart Ernest (1910–1996)". Oxford Dictionary of National Biography (online ed.). Oxford University Press. doi:10.1093/ref:odnb/63311. (subscription required)
- Robertson, Marjorie (1976). "Bibliography of Stuart Piggott's publications". In Megaw, J. V. S. (ed.). To Illustrate the Monuments: essays on archaeology presented to Stuart Piggott on the occasion of his sixty-fifth birthday. London: Thames and Hudson. pp. 320–331. ISBN 0500011494.
