= The Trundle =

Archaeological site in West Sussex, England

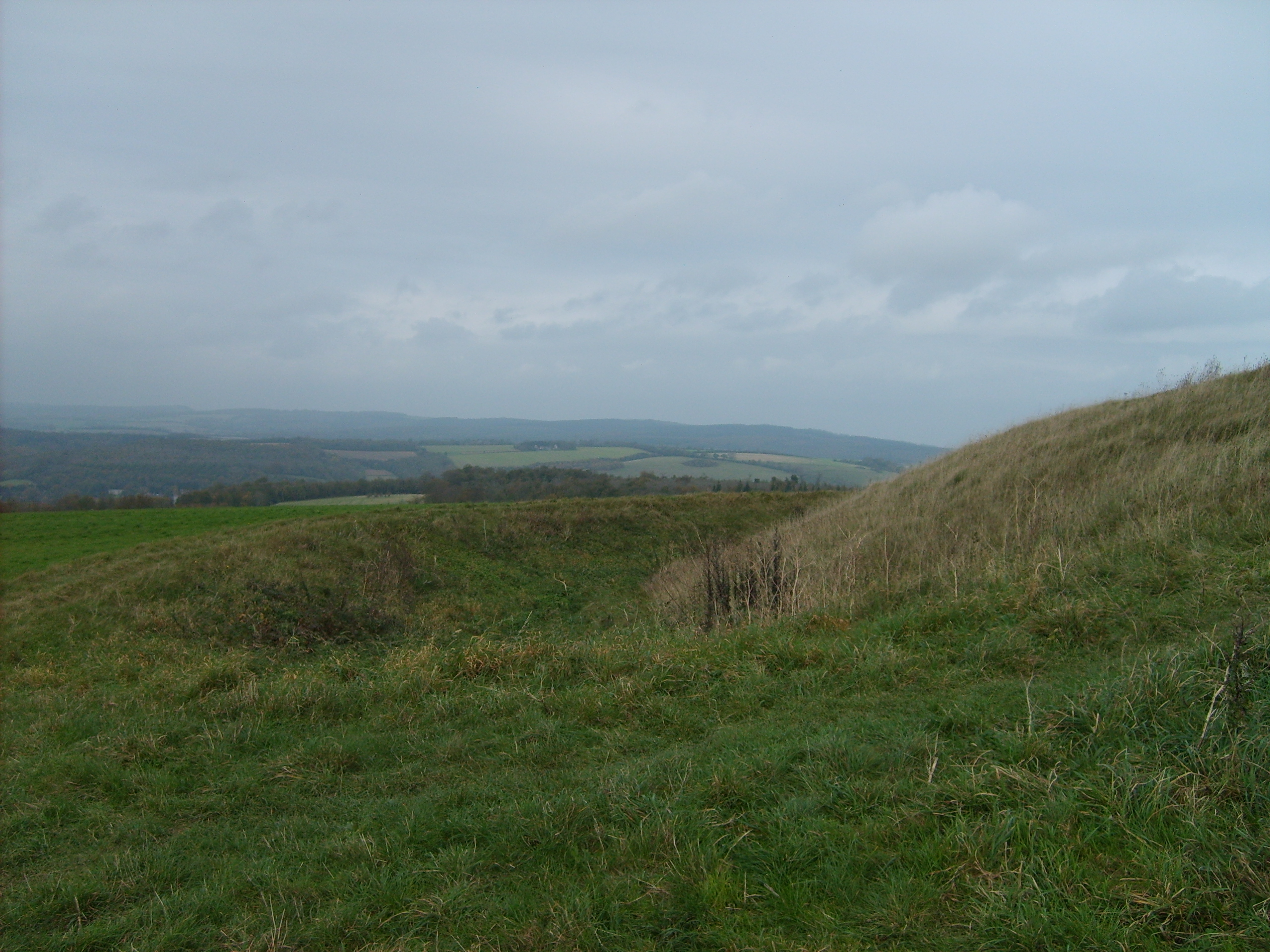
- Rampart, ditch, and bank of the Trundle Iron Age hillfort
- Interactive map of The Trundle
- 50°53′33″N 00°45′14″W
- Location: The Trundle in West Sussex, England
- OS grid reference: SU87771103

History
- Built: Iron Age

Site notes
- Area: 5.66 ha (14.0 acres)

Scheduled monument
- Official name: The Trundle hillfort, causewayed enclosure and associated remains at St Roche's Hill
- Designated: 23 February 1933
- Reference no.: 1018034

The Trundle is a hillfort on St Roche's Hill about 4 miles (6 km) north of Chichester, West Sussex, England. It was built in the Iron Age on the site of a causewayed enclosure, a form of early Neolithic earthwork found in northwestern Europe. A chapel dedicated to St Roche was built on the hill around the end of the 14th century; it was in ruins by 1570. A windmill and a beacon were subsequently built on the hill. The site was occasionally used as a meeting place in the post-medieval period.

Causewayed enclosures were built in England from shortly before 3700 BC until at least 3500 BC; they are characterized by the full or partial enclosure of an area with ditches that are interrupted by gaps, or causeways. Their purpose is not known; they may have been settlements, meeting places, or ritual sites. Hillforts were built as early as 1000 BC, in the Late Bronze Age, and continued to be built through the Iron Age until shortly before the Roman occupation. The hillfort is still a substantial earthwork, but the Neolithic site was unknown until 1925 when archaeologist O.G.S. Crawford obtained an aerial photograph of the Trundle, clearly showing additional structures inside the ramparts of the hillfort. Causewayed enclosures were new to archaeology at the time, with only five known by 1930, and the photograph persuaded archaeologist E. Cecil Curwen to excavate the site in 1928 and 1930. These early digs established a construction date of about 500 BC to 100 BC for the hillfort and proved the existence of the Neolithic site.

In 2011, the Gathering Time project published an analysis of radiocarbon dates from almost forty British causewayed enclosures, including some from the Trundle. The conclusion was that the Neolithic part of the site was probably constructed no earlier than the mid-fourth millennium BC. A review of the site in 1995 by Alastair Oswald noted the presence of fifteen possible Iron Age house platforms within the hillfort's ramparts.

== Background ==
The Trundle archaeological site includes a causewayed enclosure and a hillfort. Causewayed enclosures are a form of earthwork that was built in northwestern Europe, including the southern British Isles, in the early Neolithic. Causewayed enclosures are areas that are fully or partially enclosed by ditches interrupted by gaps, or causeways, of unexcavated ground, often with earthworks and palisades in some combination. The use to which these enclosures were put has long been a matter of debate. The causeways are difficult to explain in military terms since they would have provided multiple ways for attackers to pass through the ditches to the inside of the camp, though it was suggested they could have been sally ports for defenders to emerge from and attack a besieging force.

Evidence of attacks at some sites provided support for the idea that the enclosures were fortified settlements. (Note: For example, there is evidence that both Crickley Hill and Hambledon Hill were attacked.) They may have been seasonal meeting places, used for trading cattle or other goods such as pottery. There is also evidence that they played a role in funeral rites: material such as food, pottery, and human remains was deliberately deposited in the ditches. The construction of an enclosure took only a short time, which implies significant organization since substantial labour would have been required for clearing the land, preparing trees for use as posts or palisades, and digging the ditches.

Over seventy causewayed enclosures are known in the British Isles, and they are one of the most common types of an early Neolithic site in western Europe. About a thousand are known in all. They began to appear at different times in different parts of Europe: dates range from before 4000 BC in northern France, to shortly before 3000 BC in northern Germany, Denmark, and Poland. The enclosures in southern Britain began to appear shortly before 3700 BC, and continued to be built for at least 200 years; in a few cases, they continued to be used as late as 3300 to 3200 BC.

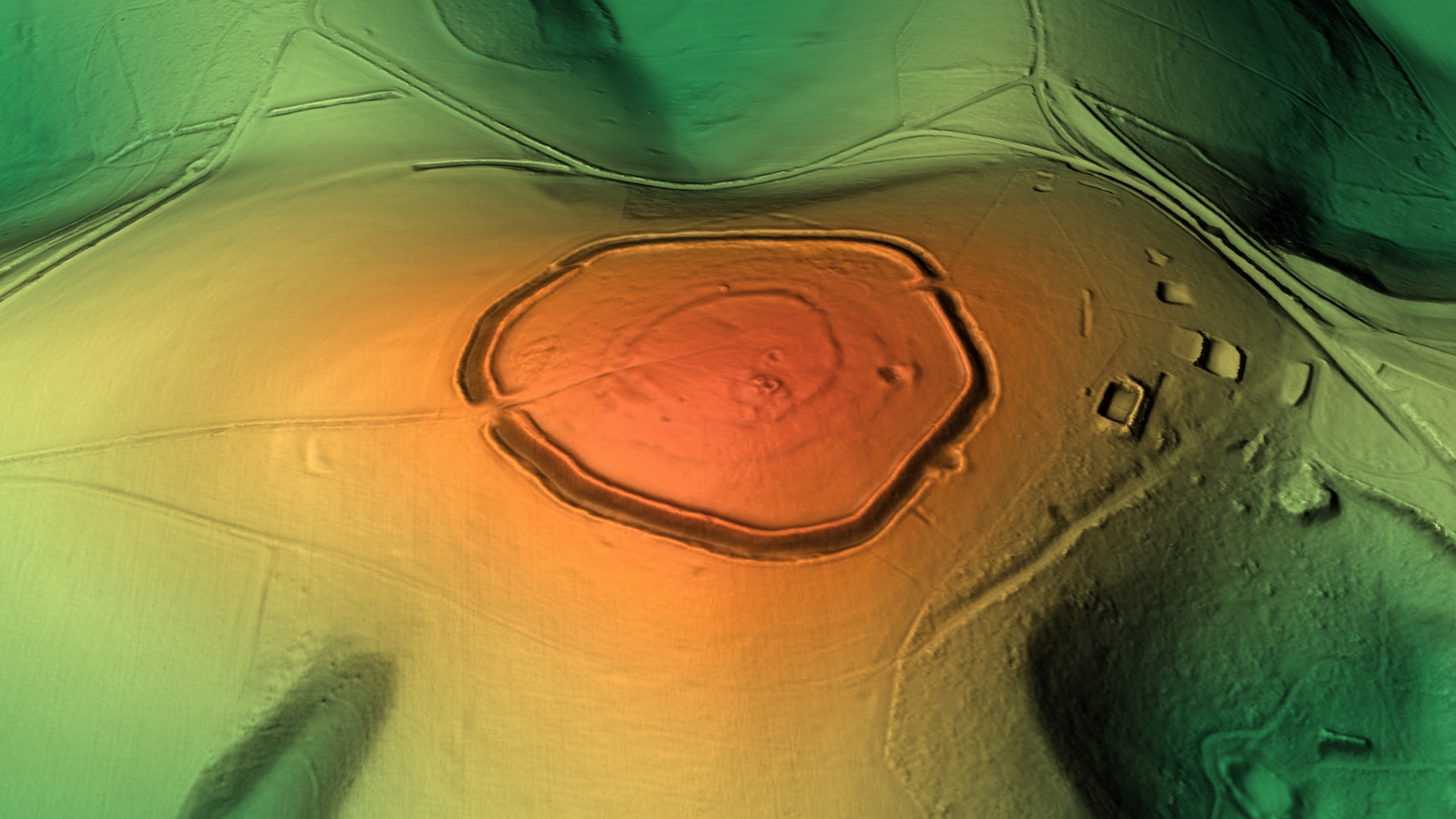
3D view of the digital terrain model

The Iron Age in Britain can be broadly divided into two periods: the Hallstatt culture is the earlier, lasting from about 800 BC until about the fifth century BC; it was followed by the La Tène culture, which lasted until the Roman occupation. Hillforts began to appear in Britain in the Late Bronze Age and continued to be built throughout most of the Iron Age. These are hilltop sites with ramparts, which could be of stone, timber, or earth. Although the name implies a defensive fortification, excavations have revealed that these sites were used for other purposes: there is evidence of settlement at some sites, and they may have had religious significance. Animals, as well as people, may have been kept within the ramparts, and there is evidence that the entrances to some hillforts were designed to funnel animals into the interior. Hillforts typically have one or two entrances, unlike causewayed enclosures. Thousands of hillforts have been identified in the British Isles. After about 100 BC, oppida, another kind of fortified settlement, became more common.

== Site and interpretation ==
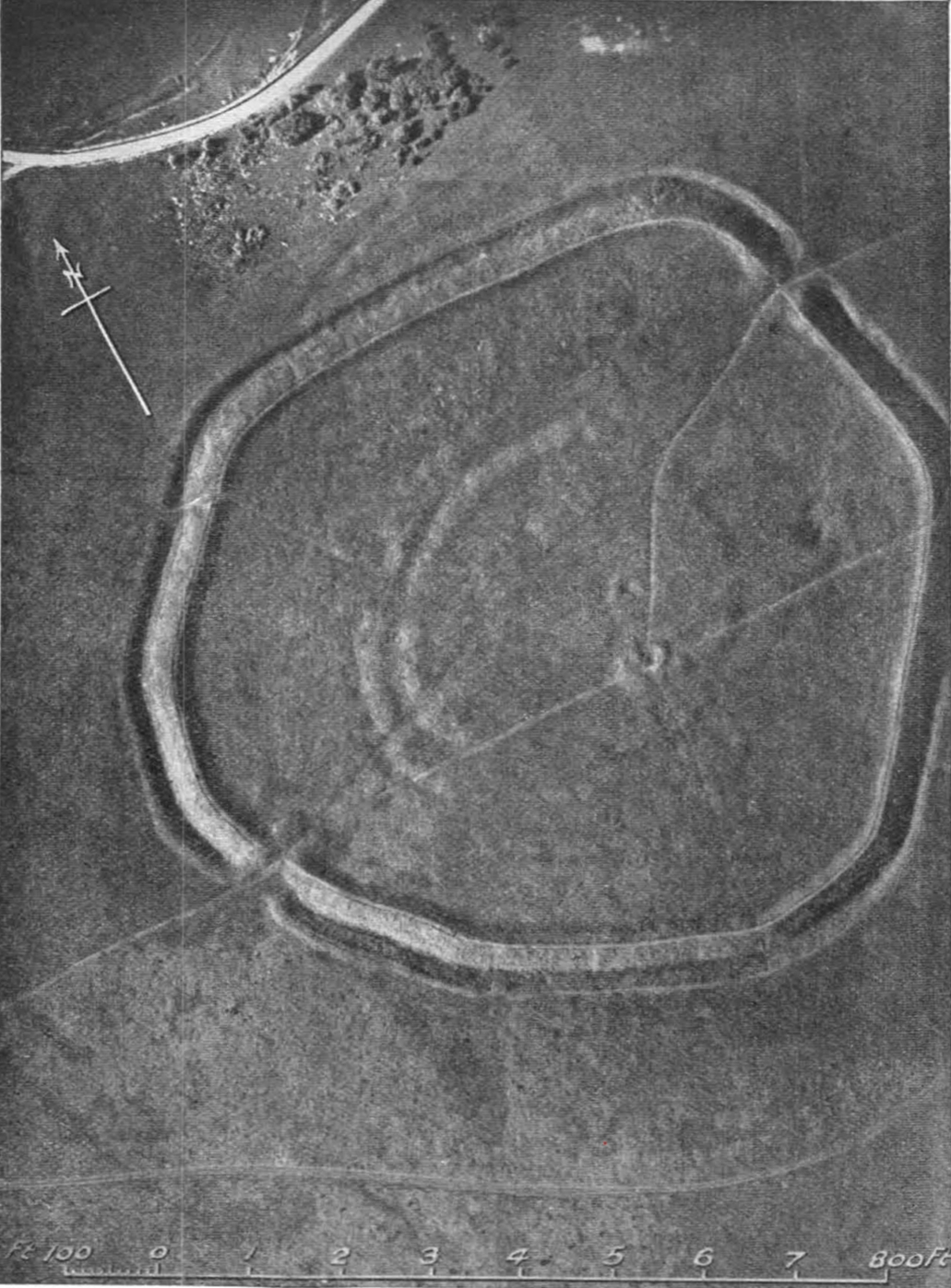
Aerial photograph of the Trundle taken in 1925. The outer irregular polygon is the Iron Age hillfort; the fainter inner arcs are caused by the ditches of the Neolithic causewayed enclosure.

The summit on which both the causewayed enclosure and the hillfort stand is St Roche's Hill, an outcrop of the Upper Chalk that lies at the western end of a ridge. The hill is four miles north of Chichester, near to Goodwood Racecourse. It rises above the neighbouring hills and so is clearly visible from all sides. There is an Ordnance Survey (OS) trig point at the top of the hill, which has an elevation of 206 m (676 ft); an earlier trigonometrical station, placed on the hill in 1791, was probably at the same location. The causewayed enclosure consists of at least four circular or partly circular ditches. The exact nature of these earthworks is now hard to determine because the hillfort partly overlies the earlier ditches. The innermost ditch, which encloses an area of 0.95 ha (2.3 acres), has an internal bank, and may have been the first of the Neolithic ditches to be dug.

Concentric with this is a second ditch that lies a short distance outside the innermost ditch; this second ditch was thought by E. Cecil Curwen (who excavated the site in 1928 and 1930) to spiral out so that the circuit extended more than a full circle around the centre of the enclosure. Curwen named the outermost part of this earthwork the "spiral ditch", at the point on the west where it paralleled the second ditch, but later surveys make the relationships of the ditches less certain, and it is now thought that the appearance of these ditches may be the result of multiple enclosure ditches dug over a long period. A further, outer, ditch was thought by Curwen to only appear from under the Iron Age earthworks at the north of the site, but it has since been suggested that cropmarks visible to the west represent part of this ditch. There may also be further early earthworks that have been completely overlain by the hillfort. The causewayed enclosure ditches were probably dug in the first half of the fourth millennium BC. The site was one of the first to be confirmed as a causewayed enclosure by excavation; the other four known by 1930 were Whitehawk Camp, Knap Hill, Windmill Hill and Abingdon.

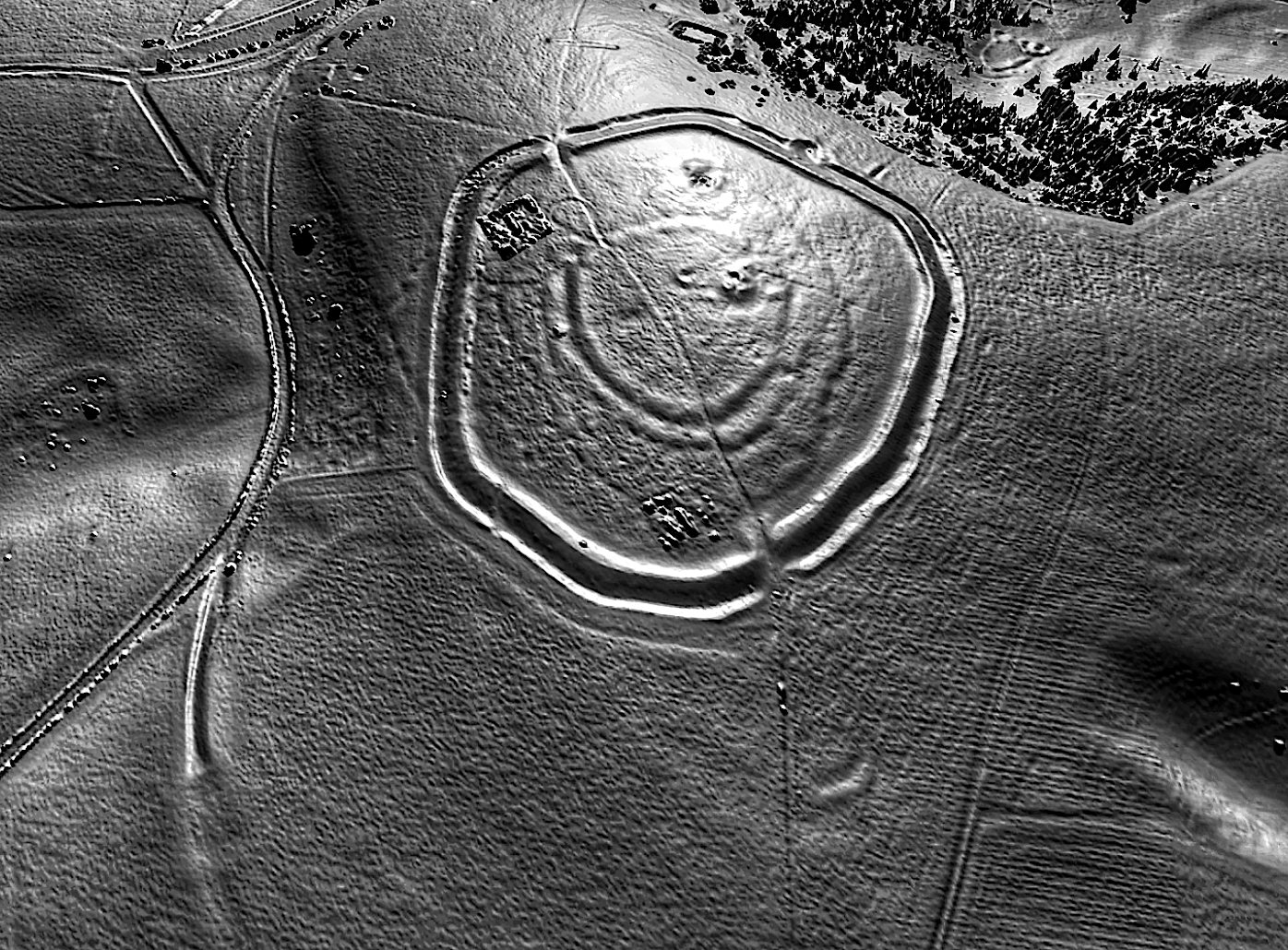
A high contrast lidar view of the hillfort

The Iron Age hillfort consists of a well-defined bank and ditch, with a smaller outer bank, in an irregular nine-sided polygon. There are two gaps, at the east-northeast and west-southwest edges, indicating entrances. The depth of the ditch and the height of the bank vary, with the highest point reaching 5.5 m (6.0 yd) above the bottom of the ditch. The ditches enclose an area of about 5.66 ha (14.0 acres). A linear cropmark outside the banks has not been excavated but archaeologist Alastair Oswald, who surveyed the site in 1995 for the Royal Commission on the Historical Monuments of England (RCHME), considered it to be no earlier than Iron Age. Oswald also noted the presence of fifteen depressions in the soil within the ramparts that could indicate Iron Age house platforms, and three areas that may have been Roman building platforms. There are two dykes to the north, crossing two of the ridges that approach the hill; the eastern of these included a crouched burial, revealed when a carpark was constructed there, and thought to be dated to the Bronze Age, based on the presence of what appeared to be a round barrow.

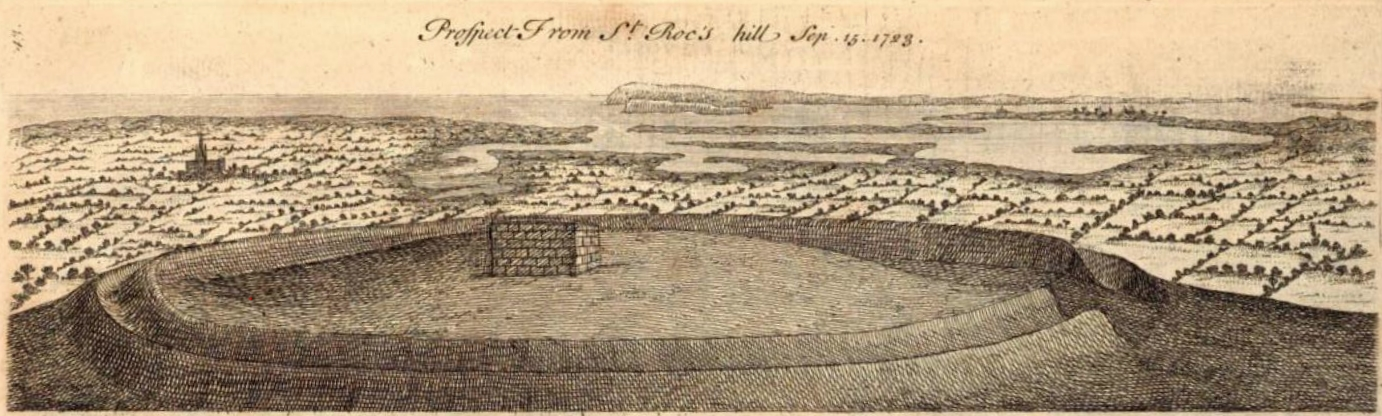
St. Roche's hill; etching dated 15 September 1723, from the north; published in William Stukeley's Itinerarium Curiosum

The hill is named for St Roche, a French saint who died no earlier than the mid-14th century. A chapel dedicated to him is known to have existed on the hill; it is unlikely to have been built much before the end of that century. A document from 1570 refers to it as "the late chapell of St Rooks", so it was apparently already in ruins by that date, probably having been abandoned or destroyed during the Reformation. It appears on a 1575 map, but a 1595 map simply describes the hilltop as a castle. A 1723 engraving of the hill shows a ruined building not yet reduced to its foundations, which probably represents the chapel.

In 1645, William Cawley reported in Parliament that a thousand Clubmen—one of several local militias formed to oppose the depredations of both sides in the English Civil War—had assembled on the hill. There was a beacon on the hill from the late 16th century until at least the early 19th century: it is mentioned in 1586, though it does not appear on a 1595 map, but it is recorded on maps dated 1646 and 1675, and appears again on an OS map in 1813. "The Beacon" is recorded as an alternative name for the hill in 1920.

A windmill, which burned down in 1773, is known to have existed on the hill; Hadrian Allcroft, a historian, describes it as having been built "almost upon the ruins" of the chapel. Oswald's 1995 survey records the remains of two adjacent rectangular buildings: one is about 6 m × 5 m (20 ft × 16 ft), and the other is 4.2 m × 3.3 m (14 ft × 11 ft). The latter matches the dimensions of a building foundation recorded on the summit by William Hayley Mason in 1839. Allcroft assumed that this was the foundations of the 14th-century chapel, but Oswald regards it as unsettled, though agreeing that "whichever of the two buildings is not the chapel is likely to be the later windmill". Allcroft also records that a masonic lodge that included the Duke of Richmond, the Duke of Montagu, and Lord Baltimore met at the top of the hill between 1717 and 1757; Oswald assumes the lodge met in one of the two buildings, but Allcroft says "it was, it seems, an open-air Lodge". There was at one time a gibbet on the Trundle; it appears on an OS map in 1813, but had been removed by 1825. Oswald describes two marl pits at the top of the hill that cut into the prehistoric earthworks. Two radio stations, each with four wooden masts, were built during World War II; only one mast was still present in 1995, along with a concrete foundation between the two stations. Oswald's survey found that multiple trenches and foxholes had been dug into the Iron Age banks.

== Antiquarian and archaeological investigations ==
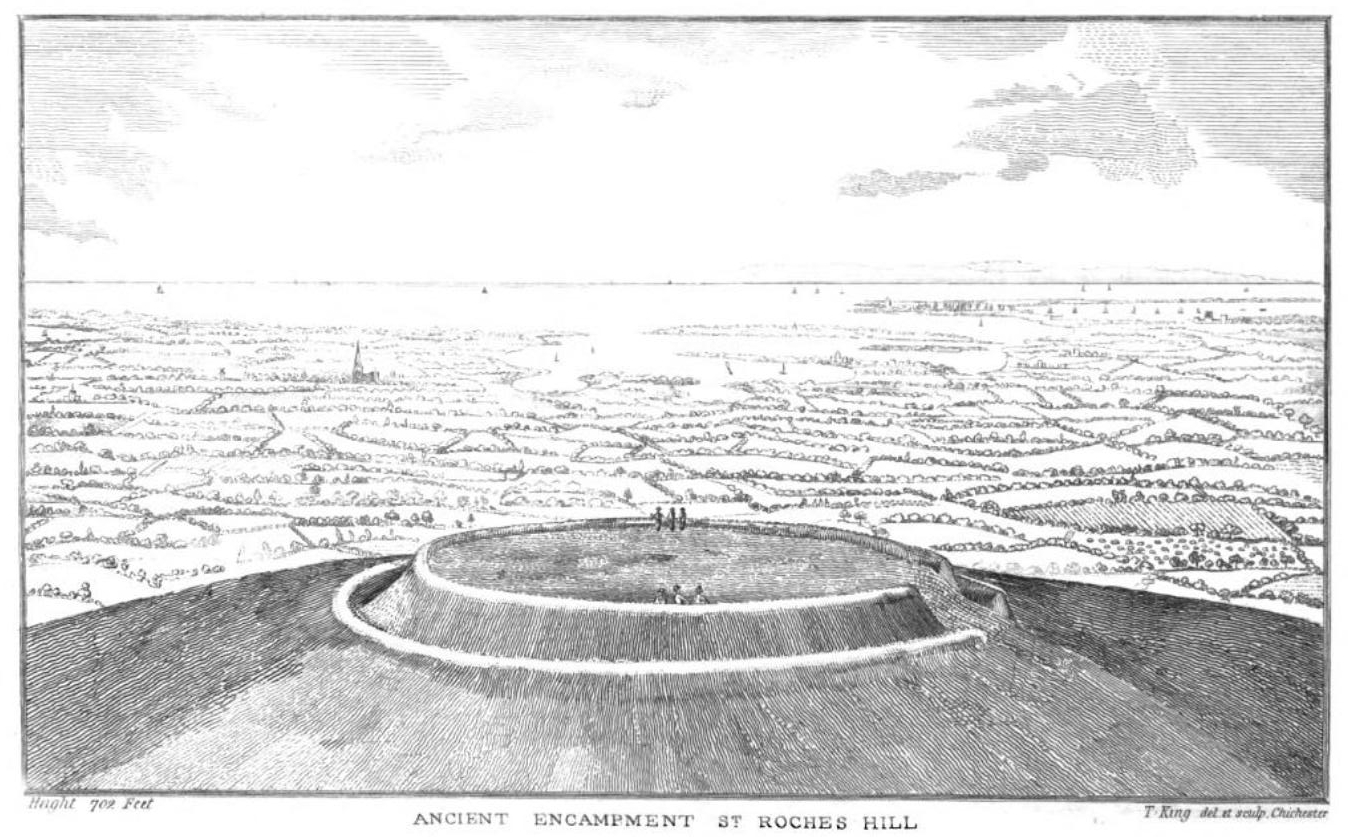
T. King's 1839 drawing of the hillfort

A 1723 etching of the hillfort is included in William Stukeley's Itinerarium Curiosum (1776), and it is mentioned in Alexander Hay's 1804 History of Chichester: "... saint Roche's hill, commonly called Rook's hill; on the top of which are the remains of a small camp, in a circular form, supposed to have been raised by the Danes, when they invaded and plundered this country". An 1835 history of Sussex discusses the hillfort, giving reasons for doubting that it was Roman or Danish, and concluding that the builders could not be certainly determined. Mason includes a picture drawn by T. King, a local antiquarian, in his 1839 survey of Goodwood.

By the time Allcroft considered the site in 1916, the hillfort was being described as a "British Camp" (the then-current term for Iron Age hillforts) on OS maps, and Allcroft gives several reasons for believing it be pre-Roman. Allcroft asserts that the name "Trundle" derives from the Anglo-Saxon for "hoop", but Oswald comments that "the general obsession with linguistic derivations at that time led to many erroneous interpretations". In 725, Nunna, a king of Sussex, granted land in the area. The charter recording the grant mentions "billingabyrig", a burh (fortified settlement), as a landmark; since the Trundle is the closest fortified site to the other places named in the charter, Curwen suggested in 1928 that the two might be one and the same, though he regarded it as unproven.

=== Curwen, 1928 ===
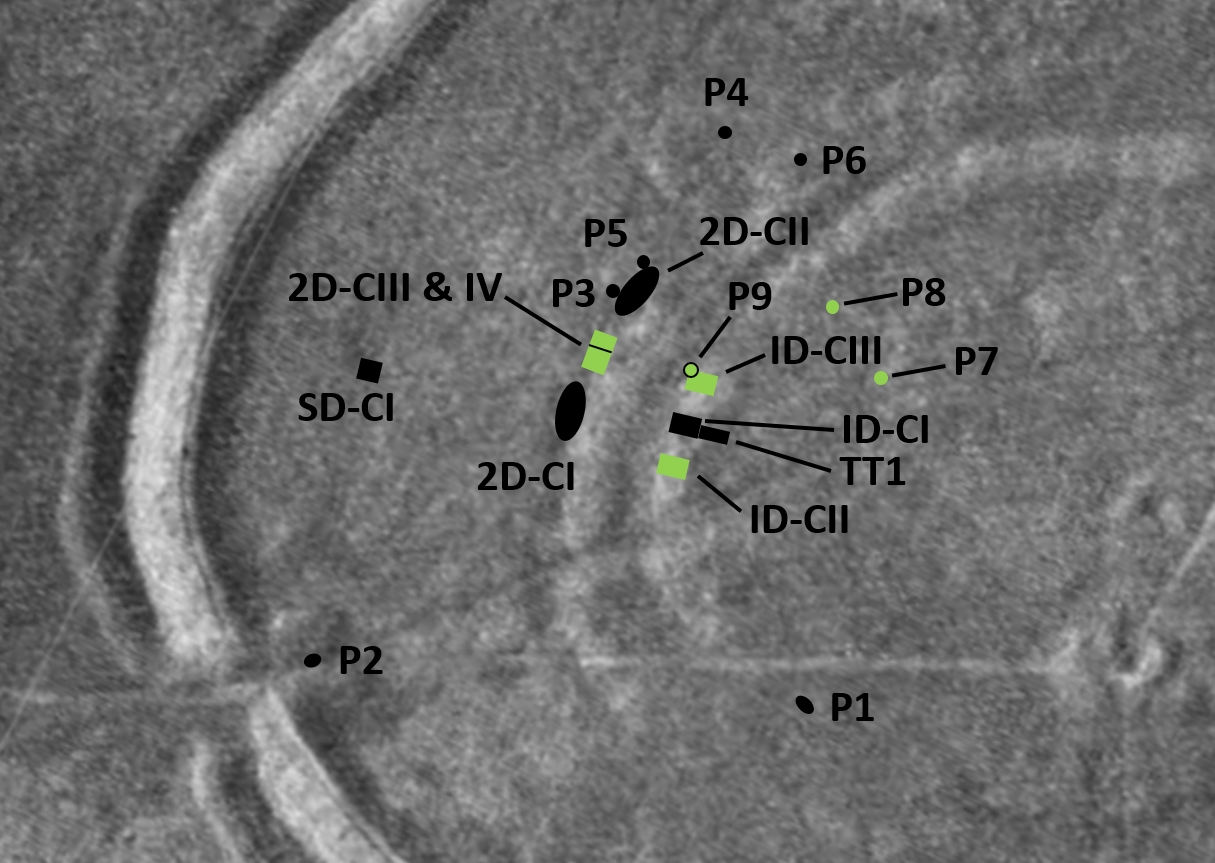
The areas excavated by Curwen in 1928 are shown in black. P1 to P6 are the six pits investigated that year; ID, 2D, and SD stand for inner, second, and spiral ditch respectively. CI to CIV stand for cuttings I to IV. TT-1 was an extension of ID-CI. Areas in green were excavated in 1930, including pits P7 to P9.

In the early 20th century, O.G.S. Crawford began obtaining aerial photographs of archaeological sites, having realized that these photographs often revealed features that were invisible from the ground, and in 1925 he arranged for a photograph to be taken of the Trundle hillfort. The additional circular earthworks revealed inside the ramparts led Crawford to believe that the hillfort had been built on the site of a Neolithic camp. To test this idea, Curwen obtained permission from the Duke of Richmond, who owned the land, and excavated the site between 7 August and 1 September 1928.

Curwen made a plan of the site showing the location of the ditches and banks, identifying the ditches by using a boser—a heavy rammer used for detecting underground bedrock, or the lack of it, by listening to the sound made when the boser strikes the ground. The plan showed an inner circuit of interrupted ditches, with a second ditch outside that which spiralled out for more than a full circle, and an outside ditch that was largely overlaid by the later Iron Age earthwork, only emerging on the outside of the northern rampart. The boser also revealed multiple pits, and Curwen commented that there were no doubt many more that were not detected.

A cutting was made in each ditch found by the boser, along a line on the western side of the site; an additional cutting was made a little further north in the second ditch. Six pits found by the boser were excavated, again on the western side of the site. The ditch cuttings found chalk rubble in the lowest layer, which Curwen took to be natural silt infill beginning with the original occupation of the site; in Oswald's 1995 review he suggested it may have been deliberately filled. Above this was a layer with a very few Hallstatt and La Tène pottery sherds, but little else, and Curwen proposed that this was deliberate infill by the Iron Age inhabitants who wished to level the site within the new hillfort's ramparts. The boundary between these two layers he suggested was the turf line that would have been the surface of the unoccupied site throughout the intervening Bronze Age. The next layer, above the infill, was full of early Iron Age pottery sherds, and Curwen concluded that this layer related to the Iron Age occupation period. Flakes of flint were frequent in the lowest levels, and rarer in the Iron Age levels, whereas potboilers (stones heated and dropped in pots of water to heat the water) were more common in the Iron Age levels. Fragments of querns (stones used to grind cereals into flour) were found: large fragments from the Iron Age, and smaller fragments from Neolithic contexts.

All but one of the pits were found to date from the Iron Age. The exception was pit 4 which was shallower than the others and contained no finds other than some ox and sheep bones; it could not be dated but it was later noted that it was similar in shape to one of the Neolithic pits at Whitehawk Camp, and might have been dug at the same time as the causewayed enclosure. Curwen was able to determine the use of some of the pits: pit 1 had apparently been under a dwelling late in the Iron Age, and contained rubbish such as broken pottery from that period; pits 3 and 5 were also rubbish pits. Pit 2, in the middle of the western entrance to the hillfort, included two large postholes, but it had apparently been filled in soon after it had been dug. Another pit was located by the boser in the same position in the eastern entrance and Curwen was only able to conclude that "both pits formed an integral part of the scheme of defence of the two entrances". While digging pit 2 Curwen found a paving layer of blocks of flint, some of which had been squared off, above the pit. There was no evidence that allowed direct dating of this layer, but Curwen suggested that the patination of the flint surfaces where they had been trimmed implied that they were laid by the Iron Age builders of the hillfort.

The area where the outer Neolithic ditch met the northern Iron Age rampart was excavated, and here Curwen found a crouched burial of a woman, 25–30 years old and about 1.5 m (4 ft 11 in) tall. The skeleton lay below a small cairn of chalk, with the hole dug into the upper part of the Neolithic level, and the rampart at that point had been built after the burial. Curwen suggested the burial dated to no later than the Early Bronze Age.

The animal bones found included oxen, sheep, and pig, and a very few roe deer; sheep bones were more common in the Iron Age than in the Neolithic levels. One piece of bone, found in the Neolithic layers, had been shaped into a phallus, and had been sawn off the original bone with a flint saw. The snails found in the Neolithic levels indicated that conditions were much damper at that time; the snails from the later levels were thought not to be all contemporary, but suggested that at the time of the Bronze Age burial and the construction of the hillfort conditions were damper than the present, but less so than in Neolithic times. Curwen estimated that the Neolithic enclosure was constructed in about 2000 BC, and the hillfort somewhere between 500 and 100 BC.

=== Curwen, 1930 ===
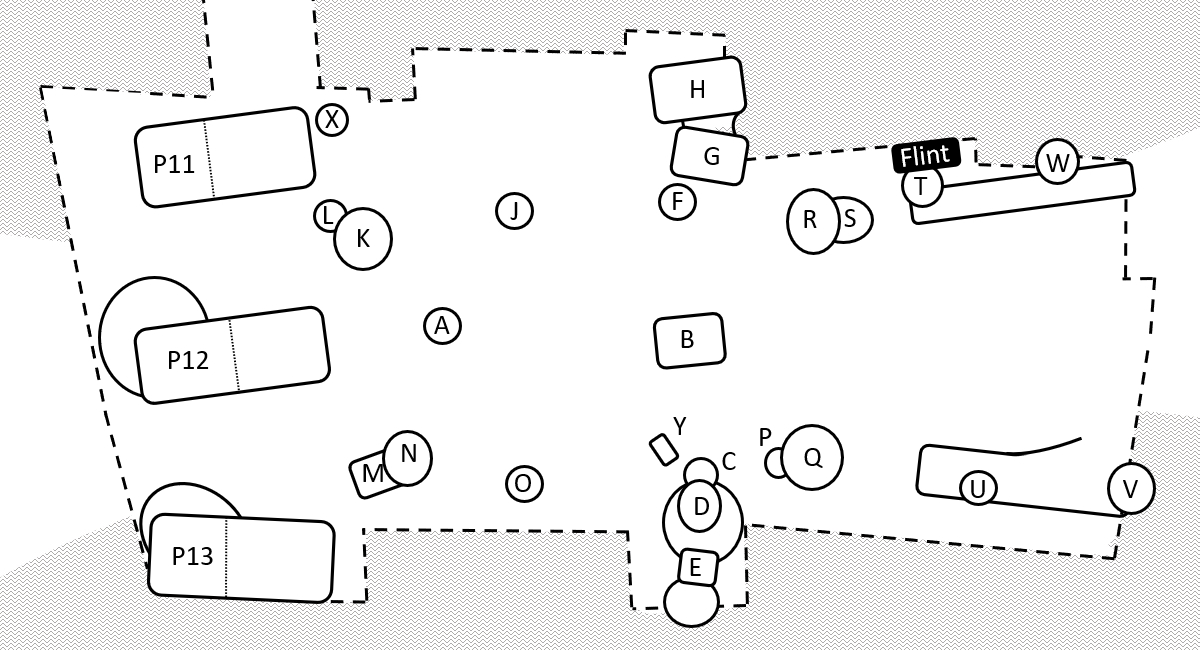
Plan of the 1930 excavations at the east entrance to the hillfort. The grey area represents the hillfort ramparts; the area inside the dashed lines was cleared down to the chalk, and the pits and holes in the chalk marked on the plan were excavated.

Curwen returned to the Trundle in 1930, excavating from 5 August to 5 September. The inner ditch was opened just south of the 1928 cutting (ID-CI), and this time the material in each identifiable layer of soil was removed together (stratigraphic excavation, which is the modern method) instead of by horizontal spits of fixed depth, as had been the case in nearly all of the 1928 excavation. Cutting ID-CI had revealed part of one of the causeways in the inner ditch, and the other side of the causeway, just north of ID-CI, was excavated in 1930. Two other cuttings were opened in the second ditch, between the two areas dug in 1928. These cuttings lacked the Iron Age occupation layer found in the inner ditch cuttings, but revealed that the ditch had been recut, with a V-shaped profile evident in the layers. Clearing the edges around this cutting revealed postholes around the edge, and this led Curwen to reopen the two adjacent areas dug in 1928, revealing postholes on the lips of those ditches as well. At the time Curwen concluded that the second ditch must have consisted of "pit dwellings", but in 1954, Stuart Piggott, an archaeologist whose first excavation had been the 1928 dig at the Trundle, argued that the postholes dated from the Iron Age, and Curwen agreed.

Four more pits were found and excavated; three in the area of the cuttings, and another inside the inner ditch; all contained Iron Age pottery sherds, including both Halltstatt and La Tène types. Curwen also excavated the entire east gate area of the hillfort, revealing numerous pits and postholes. It was apparent that not all the postholes could have been in use at the same time, since that would have rendered the gate impassable, and Curwen concluded that there must have been different gate layouts over the duration of the hillfort's use. He suggested that the set of holes A-B-D-E-G-H represented a double gateway, followed by K-N and Q-R. The three holes labelled pits 11–13 in the diagram were each about 7–8 feet deep and 4 ft square, each with a ramp leading down into them. These had never been used; the lack of weathering indicated they had been filled in very shortly after being dug. Curwen suspected that the arrangement of three deep holes in the eastern gate was mirrored in the western gate, with pit 2, from the 1928 dig, one of the three. He was unable to find a convincing interpretation for the holes, suggesting only that they might "represent a grandiose scheme of fortification which was begun shortly before the abandonment" of the hillfort. The large wooden gates that may have relied on these postholes may have required an iron pivot mechanism; iron pivots are known from several other hillforts. Of the three pits 11 to 13, his most careful notes were for pit 12, and there he noted the presence of many substantial blocks of flint, some which had been squared off, resembling the flint layer he had found in 1928 at the west entrance to the hillfort.

=== Bedwin & Aldsworth, 1980 ===
An application to replace a microwave aerial in one of the two fenced areas in the Trundle led to a rescue excavation in January 1980. Curwen's cutting SD-CI (in the spiral ditch) excavated part of a ditch section between causeways, and Owen Bedwin and Frederick Aldsworth investigated the remainder of the ditch—a length of about 3 m. Two postholes were found, one apparently very recent and the other devoid of finds. The layers in the ditch were found to match those identified by Curwen, except that Bedwin and Aldsworth distinguished a fourth layer of chalky lumps at the very bottom of the ditch. The snails found in each layer suggested that this ditch had originally been dug when the ground around it had been recently cleared for some distance around the site; by the time of the Iron Age activity it appeared that it had to be cleared again. This conclusion was revised in 1982, by which time one of the snails, Vallonia costata, was considered a woodland species, meaning that the initial area of clearance in Neolithic times may have been not much larger than the site itself. A few sherds of Iron Age pottery were found in the upper layers, and more Neolithic pottery in the lower layers, with some overlap.

=== Gathering Time, 2011 ===
The Trundle was one of the sites included in Gathering Time, a project funded by English Heritage and the Arts and Humanities Research Council to reanalyze the radiocarbon dates of nearly 40 causewayed enclosures, using Bayesian analysis. The authors, Alasdair Whittle, Frances Healy, and Alex Bayliss, published the results in 2011. Some radiocarbon dates had been obtained from animal bone samples and published in 1988, and these were included. Four additional samples were taken from finds from the earlier digs. The limited number of samples meant that it was not possible to construct a chronology with high confidence, but the results suggest that the inner ditch dates to after 3900–3370 BC; the second ditch to after 3650–3520 BC; and the spiral ditch to after 3940–3370 BC. Overall, these results imply a mid-fourth millennium BC construction date for the Neolithic earthworks.

=== Other investigations and watching briefs ===
In 1975, a skeleton was found in a shallow grave not far from the foot of the Trundle, near the racecourse. The skull and several vertebrae were missing, and from the length of the cut grave it appeared the body had been headless when buried. Fragments of an iron belt buckle were found. Since there was at one time a gibbet on the Trundle, Aldsworth suggested that the body is likely to have been that of a criminal executed nearby, between 1000 AD and 1825 AD. In 1987 and 1989 geophysical surveys were made of the Trundle, in the area where British Telecom were proposing to build radio equipment. A carpark redevelopment proposal led to a 1994 excavation with four trenches that discovered small amounts of prehistoric pottery and flints.

A detailed survey of the site was made by the RCHME in 1995, covering both the hillfort and the causewayed enclosure, with the resulting report authored by Alastair Oswald. This was part of a broader project by RCHME entitled "Industry and Enclosure in the Neolithic". It was this survey that identified the fifteen possible Iron Age house platforms within the ramparts, and Oswald also noted three possible Roman building platforms. Subsequent watching briefs in 1997, 2000, 2002, and 2013 produced nothing of archaeological interest.

== Preservation and presentation ==
The Trundle was listed as a scheduled monument in 1933. It lies within the South Downs National Park, and there are three walking trails that give access to the site. In June/July 2010, The Trundle was temporary host to Artemis, a 30 ft tall bronze sculpture of a horse designed by sculptor Nic Fiddian-Green. The sculpture was taken to Australia in 2011.

== Sources ==
- Aldsworth, F.G. (1976). "Reports" (PDF). Sussex Archaeological Collections. 114: 327–332. ISSN 0143-8204.
- Allcroft, A. Hadrian (1916). "Some Earthworks of West Sussex". Sussex Archaeological Collections. 58: 65–90. doi:10.5284/1085852. ISSN 0143-8204.
- Andersen, Niels H. (2019) [2015]. "Causewayed Enclosures in Northern and Western Europe". In Fowler, Chris; Harding, Jan; Hofmann, Daniela (eds.). The Oxford Handbook of Neolithic Europe. Oxford: Oxford University Press. pp. 795–812. ISBN 978-0-19-883249-2.
- Bedwin, O.R.; Aldsworth, F. (1981). "Excavations at The Trundle, 1980" (PDF). Sussex Archaeological Collections. 119: 208–214. ISSN 0143-8204.
- Bray, Peter; Frieman, Catherine (2008). "Archaeological Techniques". In Adkins, Roy; Adkins, Lesley; Leitch, Victoria (eds.). The Handbook of British Archaeology. London: Constable. pp. 356–404. ISBN 978-1-84529-606-3.
- Carroll, Meredith; Lang, Alexander (2008). "The Iron Age". In Adkins, Roy; Adkins, Lesley; Leitch, Victoria (eds.). The Handbook of British Archaeology. London: Constable. pp. 94–133. ISBN 978-1-84529-606-3.
- Collins, A.H. (Winter 1960–1961). "The Trundle". Joint Archaeological Committee Bulletin (4).
- Crawford, O.G.S. (1960) [1953]. Archaeology in the Field. London: Phoenix House. OCLC 427206533.
- Cunnington, M.E. (1912). "Knap Hill Camp". Wiltshire Archaeological and Natural History Magazine. 37: 42–65. ISSN 0262-6608.
- Curwen, E. Cecil (1929). "Excavations in The Trundle, Goodwood, 1928". Sussex Archaeological Collections. 70: 33–85. doi:10.5284/1085636. ISSN 0143-8204.
- Curwen, E. Cecil (1930). "Neolithic camps". Antiquity. 4 (13): 22–54. doi:10.1017/S0003598X00004178. ISSN 0003-598X. S2CID 246055035.
- Curwen, E. Cecil (1931). "Excavations in The Trundle, Second Season, 1930". Sussex Archaeological Collections. 72: 100–149. doi:10.5284/1086064. ISSN 0143-8204.
- Curwen, E. Cecil (1954). The Archaeology of Sussex. London: Methuen. OCLC 1071038166.
- Drewett, Peter; Rudling, David; Gardiner, Mark (1988). The South-East to AD 1000. Harlow, Essex: Longman. ISBN 0-582-49271-8.
- Hamilton, Sue; Manley, John (2001). "Hillforts, monumentality and place: a chronological and topographic review of first millennium BC hillforts of south-east England". European Journal of Archaeology. 4 (1): 7–42. doi:10.1179/eja.2001.4.1.7. ISSN 1741-2722.
- Hay, Alexander (1804). The History of Chichester. Chichester: Seagrave. OCLC 79635969.
- Healy, Frances; Bayliss, Alex; Whittle, Alasdair (2015) [2011]. "Sussex". In Whittle, Alasdair; Healy, Frances; Bayliss, Alex (eds.). Gathering Time: Dating the Early Neolithic Enclosures of Southern Britain and Ireland. Oxford: Oxbow. pp. 207–262. ISBN 978-1-84217-425-8.
- Holmes, Edric (2019). Seaward Sussex (Reprint of 1920 ed.). Chicago: Good Press. OCLC 561321666.
- Horsfield, Thomas Walker (1835). The History, Antiquities, and Topography of the County of Sussex: Volume the Second. Lewes: Baxter. OCLC 1520871.
- Jones, J.D. (1968). "The Hampshire Beacon Plot of 1586" (PDF). Proceedings of the Hampshire Field Club & Archaeological Society. 25: 105–118. ISSN 2398-5828.
- Mason, William Hayley (1839). Goodwood: Its House Park and Grounds, with a Catalogue Raisonné of the Pictures in the Gallery of His Grace the Duke of Richmond, K.G. London: Smith, Elder, and Co. OCLC 973472486.
- Ogilby, John (1699) [1675]. The Traveller's Guide. London: Printed by T. Ilive for Abel Swall. OCLC 933069321.
- Oswald, Alastair (May 1995). A Causewayed Enclosure and the Trundle Hillfort on St. Roche's Hill, Singleton, West Sussex (Report). RCHME.
- Oswald, Alastair; Dyer, Carolyn; Barber, Martin (2001). The Creation of Monuments: Neolithic Causewayed Enclosures in the British Isles. Swindon, UK: English Heritage. ISBN 1-873592-42-6.
- Piggott, Stuart (1954). The Neolithic Cultures of the British Isles. Cambridge: Cambridge University Press. OCLC 459497872.
- Pope, Rachel; Mason, Richard; Hamilton, Derek; Rule, Eddie; Swogger, John (2020). "Hillfort gate-mechanisms: a contextual, architectural reassessment of Eddisbury, Hembury, and Cadbury hillforts". Archaeological Journal. 177 (2): 339–407. doi:10.1080/00665983.2019.1711301. OCLC 1101741431. S2CID 219157168.
- Pouncett, John (2008). "The Neolithic Period". In Adkins, Roy; Adkins, Lesley; Leitch, Victoria (eds.). The Handbook of British Archaeology. London: Constable. pp. 36–62. ISBN 978-1-84529-606-3.
- Stukeley, William (1776). Itinerarium Curiosum. London: Baker and Leigh. OCLC 220119105.
- Wedgwood, C.V. (1997) [1958]. The King's War: 1641–1647. New York: Book of the Month Club.
- Whittle, Alasdair; Healy, Frances; Bayliss, Alex (2015) [2011]. "Gathering time: causewayed enclosures and the early Neolithic of southern Britain and Ireland". In Whittle, Alasdair; Healy, Frances; Bayliss, Alex (eds.). Gathering Time: Dating the Early Neolithic Enclosures of Southern Britain and Ireland. Oxford: Oxbow. pp. 1–16. ISBN 978-1-84217-425-8.
