= White Barrow =

Long barrow in Wiltshire, England

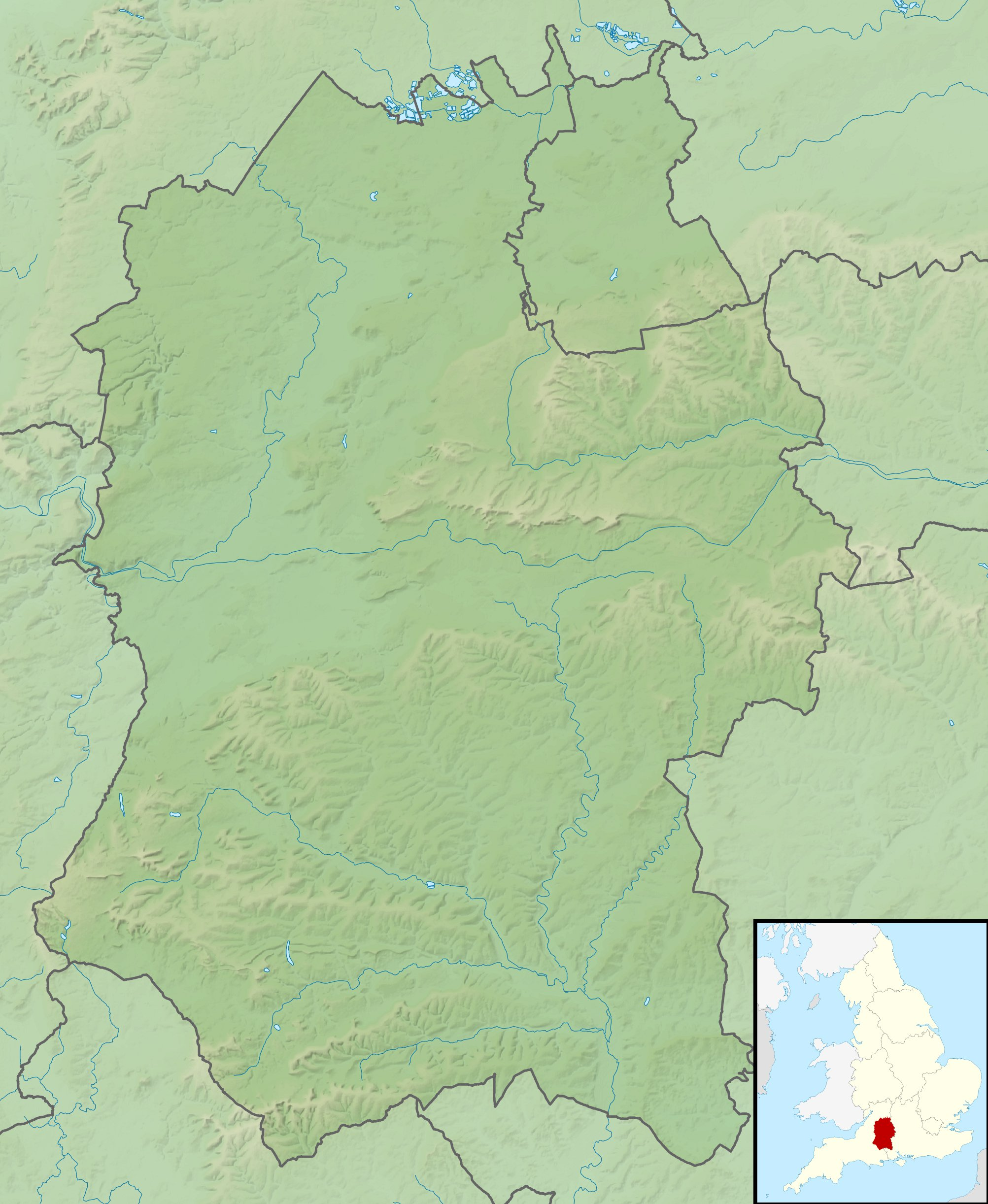
- Location within Wiltshire
- 51.2208°N 1.95427°W
- Type: Long barrow
- Periods: Neolithic
- Location: Salisbury Plain, England

Site notes
- Length: 77.5 metres (254 ft)
- Width: 47 metres (154 ft)
- Owner: National Trust

Identifiers
- NHLE: 1018159

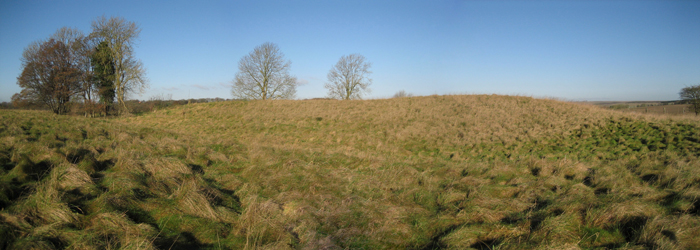
White Barrow

White Barrow is a large Neolithic long barrow just below the crest of Copehill Down on Salisbury Plain, just south of the village of Tilshead in Wiltshire, England. It is a scheduled monument, and the first ancient monument to be purchased by the National Trust.

== History ==
White Barrow is 77.5 m long and approximately 47 m wide (including the surrounding ditch). It has never been fully excavated, but dating of materials found in and around it suggests that it dates from 3500 to 4000 BC, making it contemporary with other long barrows on Salisbury Plain, as well as the nearby causewayed enclosure called Robin Hood's Ball. The antiquarian Colt Hoare opened the mound in the 1806, and found areas of black earth that he believed to be the remains of a wooden-structured burial chamber.

A geophysical survey by English Heritage in 1997 found evidence of a possible burial chamber or mortuary cairn inside the barrow, and an arc of post pits at its eastern end. A former trackway crossing the site from southwest to northeast was also found.

The barrow was designated as a scheduled monument in 1960.

== National Trust purchase ==
White Barrow was the first piece of land that the National Trust acquired purely in the interests of archaeological conservation. Prior to that, the Trust had mainly been concerned with open spaces, houses and gardens. The barrow, along with 2.75 acres (11,100 m^{2}) of land, was purchased by subscription in 1909 for £60, at a time when the War Office was rapidly buying up land around it as part of what became the Salisbury Plain Training Area.

== Badger exclusion ==
In 1998, a family of seven badgers was evicted from a sett they had dug into the barrow. A badger exclusion licence was obtained from English Nature, and English Heritage gave scheduled monument consent. The badgers were lured to a new sett outside of the property, and the barrow was covered in chain link fencing to prevent animals from burrowing into it again. Finds in the badger spoil from the old sett included struck flints, Neolithic and Bronze Age pottery, and part of a red deer antler.
