= Abingdon causewayed enclosure =

Archaeological site in Oxfordshire

A causewayed enclosure was found at Abingdon in Oxfordshire in 1926. Causewayed enclosures are a form of early Neolithic earthwork found in northwestern Europe; they were built in England from shortly before 3700 BC until about 3300 BC and are characterized by the full or partial enclosure of an area with ditches that are interrupted by gaps, or causeways. Their purpose is not known; they may have been settlements, or meeting places, or ritual sites.

The enclosure was found in 1926 while quarrying for gravel, and was partly excavated in 1926 and 1927 by E.T. Leeds. Subsequent excavations took place in 1954 and 1963. The site was probably constructed in the 37th or 36th century BC.

== Sources ==
- Andersen, Niels H. (2019) [2015]. "Causewayed Enclosures in Northern and Western Europe". In Fowler, Chris; Harding, Jan; Hofmann, Daniela (eds.). The Oxford Handbook of Neolithic Europe. Oxford: Oxford University Press. pp. 795–812. ISBN 978-0-19-883249-2.
- Healy, Frances; Whittle, Alasdair; Bayliss, Alex; Hey, Gill; Robertson-Mackay, Reay; Allen, Tim; Ford, Steve (2015) [2011]. "The Thames Valley". In Whittle, Alasdair; Healy, Frances; Bayliss, Alex (eds.). Gathering Time: Dating the Early Neolithic Enclosures of Southern Britain and Ireland. Oxford: Oxbow. pp. 387–433. ISBN 978-1-84217-425-8.
- Oswald, Alastair; Dyer, Carolyn; Barber, Martin (2001). The Creation of Monuments: Neolithic Causewayed Enclosures in the British Isles. Swindon, UK: English Heritage. ISBN 1-873592-42-6.
