= Archaeology South-East =

- Company type: Exempt Charity, Company Incorporated by Royal Charter
- Industry: Archaeology; Cultural Heritage
- Founded: 2006
- Headquarters: London, UK
- Number of locations: London, Portslade, Braintree
- Key people: Dominic Perring
- Services: Services list: Cultural Heritage Management; Excavation; Archaeological field survey; Rescue Archaeology; Post-excavation analysis; Community archaeology; Archaeological Consultancy
- Number of employees: c. 70 (2014)
- Website: www.ucl.ac.uk/archaeologyse/

Archaeology South-East (ASE) is a large contracts division in southern England which provides professional archaeological services for public and private sector clients. Clients include commercial developers and environment agencies (who need to take account of archaeology during construction projects, in line with the UK government's National Planning Policy Framework) and private house owners who require historic building recording services. ASE is based in offices in Portslade, near Brighton with additional offices in London and Braintree and specialises in work in Southeast England including Greater London.

Archaeology South-East is part of UCL Centre for Applied Archaeology (CAA), itself part of UCL Institute of Archaeology which is a global research and teaching institution. In conjunction with the CAA, staff at ASE have been involved in archaeological work and heritage consultancy in over 87 countries.

== Overview ==
Archaeology South-East carries out a wide range of archaeological services. As well as heritage consultancy advice and historic building recording. ASE also carries out excavation and fieldwork including surveying, Geomatics, Impact Assessments (to identify the future consequences of a development), and desk-based assessments (to establish the potential archaeological resource of a proposed development area). Other specialist services include Community archaeology, finds analysis, environmental services, publication and illustration. Through the CAA Archaeology South-East also provides teaching and training within research projects and provides volunteer placement opportunities for school and university students. ASE is also involved in developing professional practice and pioneering new approaches to the study of archaeology.

== History ==
Peter Drewett established a Field Archaeology Unit in Sussex in the 1970s in order to provide training for students from UCL Institute of Archaeology. During the 1980s and 1990s, under the Directorships of David Rudling (1991–2004) and Dominic Perring (2004–present), the Unit became more involved in commercially funded projects. In 2006, after re-structuring and the foundation of UCL Centre for Applied Archaeology, the Unit’s name changed to Archaeology South-East in order to focus on commercial contracts. Archaeology South-East has now completed over 2000 commercial projects. In 2014 it employed around 70 permanent members of staff and had an annual operating turnover of 2–3 million. In 2013 Essex County Council transferred the services of its Field Archaeology Unit to Archaeology South-East becoming part of the wider provision of the services offered by UCL.

== Registered archaeological organisation and charity status ==
Archaeology South-East is a Registered Archaeological Organisation with the Chartered Institute for Archaeologists. As part of University College London. ASE is an Exempt Charity (Statutory Instrument 1978, no. 453, and a Company Incorporated by Royal Charter (England/Wales, no. RC000631).

== Projects ==
Some of the projects that Archaeology South-East has managed include:

== Fieldwork ==
Lewes Excavations, East Sussex. From 1999 to present. Preceding urban development in the historic town of Lewes ASE managed a programme of excavations, research and community archaeology. Extensive remains from the Medieval and Post Medieval period were uncovered, as well as rare evidence of the earlier occupation of the town.

Brisley Farm, Ashford, Kent. From 1999 to present. Kent County Council carried out a programme of archaeological research in advance of large-scale residential development on the hinterland of the historic market town of Ashford. ASE contributed to this programme by completing post-excavation analysis of the results of these investigations. This analysis has revealed an ancient landscape located to the south of Ashford, spanning the period from Prehistoric through to the Roman period including two Late Iron Age burials with weapons ('Warrior burials').

== Historic Buildings Recording ==
Rye, East Sussex. Archaeology South-East was involved in a research project, co-ordinated and funded by the Romney Marsh Research Group, to examine the built environment and heritage of Rye, a Sussex Port Town with a notable number of surviving historic buildings from the Medieval period

Scotney Castle, Kent. In 2008, as part of a programme of repairs, the National Trust commissioned Archaeology South-East to carry out a survey of Scotney Castle, an English country house including areas not normally accessible.

== Community archaeology ==
Petworth House, West Sussex, 2013. Archaeology South-East was commissioned by the National Trust to assist in the delivery of a community archaeology project at Petworth House a 17th-century mansion in West Sussex. As part of the Festival of British Archaeology celebrations a community excavation took place in the park and uncovered a part of the ‘lost’ North Wing of Petworth House. Volunteers who took part in the project received training in excavation, recording, finds processing and identification.

Whitehawk Camp Community Archaeology Project, Brighton, East Sussex. In 2014 UCL CAA, Brighton and Hove City Council and Brighton and Hove Archaeological Society received Heritage Lottery Fund money to carry out a 12-month community archaeology project focusing on Whitehawk Hill, its Neolithic causewayed enclosure and the collection of objects excavated from the site in the 1920s and 1930s. A series of volunteering opportunities, workshops and outreach events took place at Brighton Museum & Art Gallery and Whitehawk Hill. The aims of the project were to promote an awareness of the historic landscape, contribute to a better understanding of Whitehawk Camp, a nationally significant monument, and to improve its protection and management. This project builds on earlier initiatives; in 2009 ASE held a Stone Age Open Day on the site.

== International ==
Beirut and the Archaeology of Conflict. from 1994 to 2006. A series of archaeological excavations, conducted as part of a programme of Post-war reconstruction in Beirut, the capital of Lebanon. The programme of research involved the training of Lebanese archaeologists, and assessment of urban remains dating from the Bronze Age to the recent Islamic past.

Quaternary Archaeology Fieldwork Project and Training School. 1999 to present. A multi-disciplinary project run in partnership with the University of Manchester, University of Wales and University of Southampton, the British Museum and the Oxford Radiocarbon Accelerator Unit. This ongoing project concerns the reinvestigation of the Neanderthal site of La Cotte de St Brelade, Jersey.

Through the CAA ASE staff have also provided consultancy advice to the Ancient Merv Project, Turkmenistan, a project managed by UCL Institute of Archaeology. ASE has contributed to the development and implementation of an integrated site management programme which has included archaeology, conservation, community outreach and training, and site interpretation.
