= Büdelsdorf (enclosure) =

Neolithic structure near Rendsburg in Schleswig-Holstein, Germany

The causewayed enclosure Büdelsdorf LA 1 near Rendsburg is located in Schleswig-Holstein. It is a structure that was built during the Neolithic period and belongs to Northern European "monumental architecture". The Büdelsdorf LA 1 enclosure was surrounded in parts by four concentric rings with elaborately designed gateways. The enclosure has a long and complex history of use. In the beginning and at the end, the actual enclosure existed. A settlement was uncovered inside the complex, which was used in an intermediate phase when the enclosure was probably not in use. Together with the Neolithic cemetery of Borgstedt nearby, the enclosure forms a Neolithic micro-region.

The Büdelsdorf LA 1 enclosure was investigated and comprehensively published by Franziska Hage as part of the Priority Programme SPP 1400 "Early Monumentality and Social Differentiation", sub-project Monumental enclosures, non-megalithic and megalithic tombs of the early and middle Neolithic in Schleswig-Holstein: "Studies on the construction history, age determination, function and landscape relations within the micro regions Büdelsdorf and Albersdorf", funded by the DFG and directed by Johannes Müller.

== Location ==
The site Büdelsdorf LA 1 is located at the geomorphological boundary of the young moraine of the Eastern Hills and the outlying glacial outwash plain. The site is located north of the present-day town of Rendsburg on a hilltop on the north bank of the Eider River. To the north at a distance of about 800 m are terrain knolls on which the Borgstedt cemetery is located.

== Excavation and results ==
Discovered by a historian collector in the 1950s, large-scale excavations were carried out in 1969–1974. A small re-excavation was carried out as part of the DFG-funded SPP 1400 in 2013.

The settlement area covers 5 ha. Many settlement pits and post-holes were found. The latter (353 pieces) allow the reconstruction of ten houses. These are between 25 and 36 m long and 5 to 6.4 m wide. The Büdelsdorf houses combine architectural elements Neolithic houses of northern Germany and southern Scandinavia.

The Büdelsdorf 2 settlement was multi-phase, as intersecting features reveal. Nevertheless, a settlement of 40 simultaneous houses is likely. No evidence indicates that the enclosure was used during the settlement phase.

The enclosure that surrounds the settlement covers 5.6 ha and could be accessed through two entrances to the northeast and east. It consists of three surrounding ditches, presumably formed by single segments joined. The ditches were 2–3.5 m wide and 1–2.5 m deep. They were opened several times and quickly closed again. Between the ditches, ramparts (made of excavated material from the ditches) were built and rows of palisades were installed. In addition, two rows of double palisades are documented in the inner part of the enclosure and a massive flank palisade was erected in the entrance area.

== Phases ==
A total of 74 14C datings were made, on the basis of which a phase model could be established.

- Büdelsdorf 1a (3750-3650 BC) and Büdelsdorf 1b (3490-3380 BC): enclosure 1.
- Büdelsdorf 2 (3320-3250 BC): settlement.
- Büdelsdorf 3 (3280-3220 BC): enclosure 2.
- Büdelsdorf 4 (3120-3050 BC): enclosure 3.

== Significance ==
Megalithic graves were repeatedly visited sites of small burials, probably important for collective memory. Enclosures, on the other hand, were probably important sites for establishing and maintaining the collective memory of large groups. People from a wide area had to come together to effect the construction.

The location of the enclosure at the Eider River is certainly related to its accessibility. This river system covers almost the whole of Schleswig-Holstein in its west–east extension.

The connection of monuments from the Borgstedt cemetery to the enclosure is made clear by the orientation of the long mounds, almost all of which point in the direction of the enclosure.
