= Albersdorf-Dieksknöll =

Ancient causewayed enclosure in Albersdorf, Dithmarschen, Germany

The site Albersdorf-Dieksknöll LA 68 is a causewayed enclosure of the fourth millennium BC in Albersdorf, district Dithmarschen, northern Germany. It is one of the three or four known enclosure sites in Schleswig-Holstein and of the 47 known causewayed enclosure of the Funnel Beaker Culture.

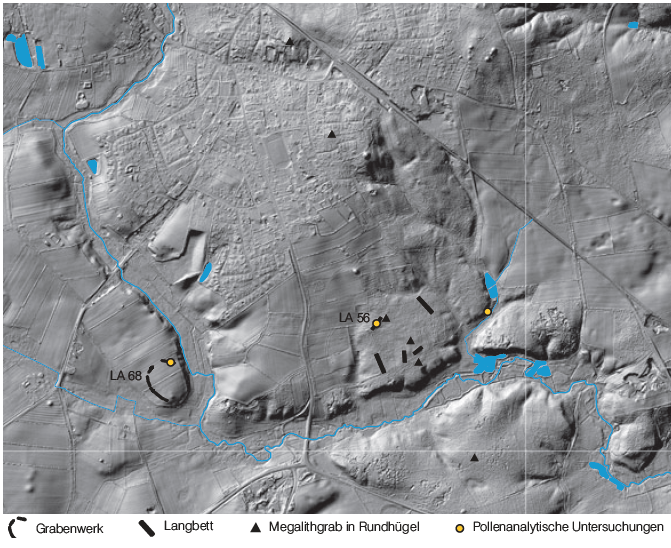
Lidar-scan of the location of the Albersdorf-Dieksknöll enclosure (LA 68). There are numerous grave monuments a few hundred meters away and they can be easily reached from the enclosure via the Gieselau river.

The Albersdorf-Dieksknöll enclosure was investigated in 1992-1994 by the German archaeologist Volker Arnold and in 2010 by the DFG Priority Programme 1400 "Early Monumentality and Social Differentiation" led by Prof. Johannes Müller. Many stages of use could be differentiated. One particular result is the long period of use. Most causewayed enclosures in northern Central Europe were abandoned in the late fourth Millennium BC. Albersdorf-Dieksknöll, however, was still in use during the third millennium BC (during the Single Grave/Corded War Culture).

== Location ==
The Albersdorf region is part of the old moraine landscape of Dithmarschen, which is shaped by smooth hills. The region is characterised by numerous Neolithic monuments. The Archaeological-Ecological Centre Albersdorf is also located here, where several reconstructed megalithic graves can be seen. Within the municipal boundary of Albersdorf, 15 monumental burial mounds of the Funnel Beaker Culture are attested, eleven of which are still visible today. In addition, numerous Late Neolithic burial mounds as well as Bronze Age burial mounds are documented.

The Fockbek and Gieselau rivers flow into each other at the foot of a ridge named Dieksknöll and continue in an easterly direction. The ridge is clearly visible in the relief. Today, the Gieselau flows into the Kiel Canal, but it used to flow into the Eider. The west–east running river system of the Eider formed an important transport system in prehistoric times. Accordingly, the Gieselau linked the microregion Albersdorf internally as well as externally.

== Phases ==
The enclosure is formed by a number of ditch segments. The individual ditch segments are not directly connected to each other. The layers that were documented, especially in segment 1, testify a dynamic biography of the enclosure. Three to five excavation and backfilling events can be identified in a number of segments.

Based on the sequences of layers, a relative chronology can be established and this has been absolutely dated using the radiocarbon method. On this basis, a phase model was created.

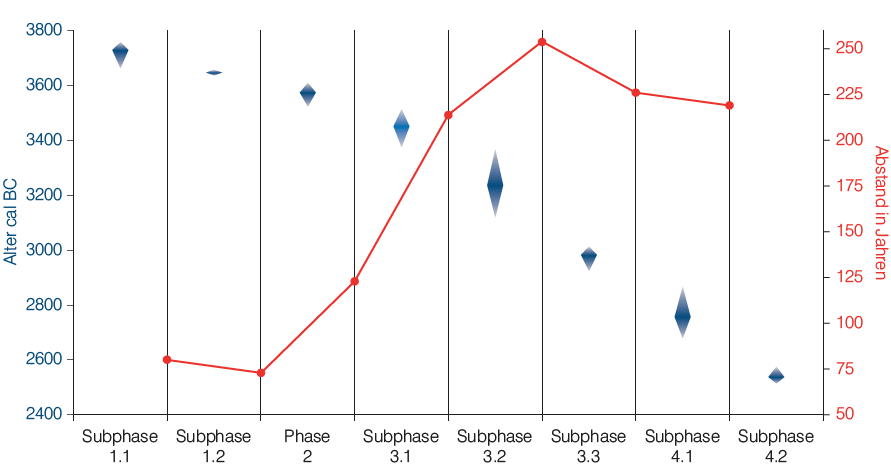
The dating of the phases as well as the length of the temporal intervals between the individual uses (highlighted in red).

All phases are distinguished by cyclic patterns of ditch excavation and refilling. In addition, various depositions of objects as well as fire events can be reconstructed.

- Phase 1 (3820-3630 BC).
- Phase 2 (3630-3520 BC).
- Phase 3 (3520-2910 BC).
- Phase 4 (2880-2480 BC).

Important observations are:

- The establishment of the enclosure occurred in the 38th century (median 3720 BC).
- the enclosurewas used for over 1200 years.
- it was still used several times during the Corded Ware phase, which is without comparison.
- the time intervals between events are variable and tend to get longer the older the monument becomes (Phases 1.1 and 1.2 are separated by about 70 to 80 years. Phases 2 and 3.1 are separated by about 120 years and hereafter the distance increases to more than 200 years).

== Findings ==
The diagnostic finds all belong to the Middle Neolithic Funnel Beaker Culture. This means that the two Late Neolithic phases (Corded Ware) could not have been recognised on the basis of the finds.

The range of finds includes mainly flint artefacts. In addition, there are fragments of pottery vessels and a few rock artefacts. A conspicuously high proportion of the vessel fragments had food crust remains or cereal imprints (including spelt barley (Hordeum vulgare), tetraploid naked wheat (Triticum durum)).

The detection of naked wheat (Triticum durum) represents an important finding. This cereal, also known as spaghetti wheat, is widely attested south of the low mountain zone (Southwestern Germany and Eastern France) from 4500 BC onwards. In the wider area of Albersdorf, the distribution area of the northern group of the Funnel Beaker Culture, this cereal is only known from Frydenlund (Funen, Denmark). The common cereals of the early Funnel Beaker Culture are emmer (Triticum dicoccum) and barley (Hordeum vulgare). Now it has been recognised that spaghetti wheat is also an important cereal for this period.

These finds and findings support the interaction of southern Scandinavia with the region of southwest Germany/eastern France in the early fourth millennium, which significantly influenced the material and immaterial culture of this epoch in the north and led to neolithisation of the north.
