= Robin Hood's Ball =

Archaeological site in England

Coordinates: 51.2128°N 1.8550°W

Robin Hood’s Ball is a Neolithic causewayed enclosure on Salisbury Plain in Wiltshire, England, approximately 5 miles (8 km) northwest of the town of Amesbury, and 2 1/2 miles (4.0 km) northwest of Stonehenge. The site was designated as a scheduled monument in 1965.

== Etymology ==
Robin Hood's Ball is unrelated to the folklore hero Robin Hood. 19th-century maps indicate that Robin Hood's Ball was the name given to a small circular copse of trees just to the northwest of the earthworks; it is probable that over time the name came to be associated with the enclosure instead. Greenwood's map of 1820 shows the copse named as Robin Hood's Ball and the enclosure as Neath Barrow.

== Context ==
A causewayed enclosure consists of a circuit of ditches dug in short segments, leaving 'causeways' passing between them to the centre. Whilst some have three or four causeways, Robin Hood’s Ball has only one, cutting through two circuits of ditches with low banks behind them. If it is assumed that the area was free of woodland in the Neolithic period, then its position on a low hill would have afforded clear views of the plain in all directions, and the site of Stonehenge would have been visible, although it is likely that the enclosure predates it by some time.

Robin Hood's Ball is outside the northern boundary of the Stonehenge World Heritage Site.

== History ==
Robin Hood’s Ball is a Neolithic feature that dates from the earliest developments around the plain. It was probably constructed at around 4000 BC and in use possibly up to 3000 BC. When first constructed, none of the monuments to the south such as the Stonehenge Cursus, Durrington Walls, or Stonehenge itself had yet been constructed. However, there may have been a henge at Coneybury, one mile east of Stonehenge, and it is possible that there were earlier features at Stonehenge before the bank and ditch were dug, as indicated by the Mesolithic postholes found beneath the former visitors' car park (in use until 2013) and now marked in grassland, adjacent to the access track to the main site.

Several long barrows were constructed on the plain around the same time, including one close to the Ball and several more within short distances such as White Barrow and Winterbourne Stoke Long Barrow. It is estimated that the site began to fall out of use around 3000 BC, about the same time as the earliest earthworks at Stonehenge (itself originally a causewayed enclosure) began.

== Use ==
Though Robin Hood's Ball has never been comprehensively excavated and its use is unclear, it has been suggested that these camps may have served as centres or rally points for a fairly wide area, where tribal ceremonies could be performed. The exact functions of causewayed enclosures are unknown. Suggestions include use as trade centres, for defence, ritual, and celebration, with multiple uses possible. The site was constructed at a time of transition from hunter-gatherer to permanent settlement during the Neolithic Revolution, and the relatively even spacing of causewayed enclosures across the south indicates that they may have been the central points of tribes or communities.

== Location ==
The site is within the Salisbury Plain Training Area, inside the boundaries of the Larkhill live firing area. It is next to a public right of way, but this can only be used when danger flags are not flying, and it is not permissible to leave the track.

== Bibliography ==
- Chippendale, C, Stonehenge Complete. (Thames and Hudson, London, 2004) ISBN 0-500-28467-9
- Richards, J, The Stonehenge Environs Project. (English Heritage, 1990) ISBN 1-85074-269-3
- English Heritage Guidebooks: Stonehenge (English Heritage, 2005) ISBN 1-85074-933-7
