= Vincent Megaw =

Australian archaeologist

Vincent Megaw AM FAHA
- Born: 1934 (age 91–92)
- Spouse: Ruth (m. 1961; died 2013)

Academic background
- Education: University of Edinburgh

Academic work
- Discipline: Archaeologist
- Sub-discipline: European Iron Age; Celtic art; Aboriginal Australian art
- Institutions: Thames and Hudson; University of Sydney; University of Leicester; Flinders University

John Vincent Stanley Megaw, AM, FAHA (born 1934) is a British-born Australian archaeologist with research interests focusing on the archaeology and anthropology of art and musical instruments, and Australasian pre-contact and historical archaeology. He is a specialist in early Celtic art and contemporary Australian Indigenous art.

== Life ==
Megaw was educated at University College School, Hampstead and the University of Edinburgh, and worked on a number key sites in Europe as well as carrying out pioneering work in the South Sydney region of Australia. He undertook extensive research with his wife, Ruth Megaw, on the art of the European pre-Roman Iron Age; they wrote several publications together. In 1961, after working as an editor at Thames and Hudson, he accepted a position at the University of Sydney as Lecturer and subsequently Senior Lecturer in European Iron Age Archaeology. From 1971 to 1982 he held the Chair of Archaeology and Head of Department at Leicester University.

His first appointment at Flinders University, Adelaide, was in 1979. In 1995 he was appointed Professor of Visual Arts and Archaeology at Flinders, retiring in 2003.

His other appointments have included Visiting Professorship at the University of Edinburgh and Senior Honorary Research Fellow in the Department of Archaeology at the University of Glasgow (from 1998 with his wife). Ruth Megaw died in 2013.

He was elected to the Australian Academy of the Humanities in 1985 and in 2004 was made a Member of the Order of Australia.

== Oral history ==
Megaw was interviewed in 1965 about his early life and career in archeology. The recording can be found at the National Library of Australia.

== Select publications ==
- Megaw, Ruth and Vincent, Celtic Art, 1989, Thames and Hudson, ISBN 0500050503
