= Peter Drewett =

British archaeologist (1947–2013)

Peter Ladson Drewett (1947 – 1 April 2013) was an English archaeologist and academic, best known for his work in Sussex.

Drewett was brought up in Croydon, where he first became interested in archaeology; he began working on excavations in his early teens, joining the Croydon Natural History & Scientific Society in 1960. Drewett later worked on digs in Sussex, and in 1973 joined Sussex Archaeological Society. After graduating, he became a lecturer at the London Institute of Archaeology and founded the Sussex Archaeological Field Unit (now Archaeology South-East), subsequently being involved in over 200 projects in the county. Sites he worked on included Caburn hillfort, Black Patch, Offham Hill, and Chanctonbury Ring. He obtained his Ph.D. in Prehistoric Archaeology from the UCL Institute of Archaeology in 1986.

In 2004 Drewett left his post in London to become the first Professor of Archaeology at the University of Sussex. He was chair and later President of Sussex Archaeological Society.

Professor Drewett also worked on excavations overseas, including Barbados and the British Virgin Islands. At the time of his death, he was Emeritus Professor at Sussex University's Centre for Community Engagement.

== Works ==
- 1991: Prehistoric Barbados
- 1999: Field Archaeology: an introduction
- 1999: The South East to AD 1000 (Regional History of England; with D. Rudling and M. Gardiner)
- 2000: Prehistoric Settlements in the Caribbean: Fieldwork in Barbados, Tortola and the Cayman Islands
- 2007: Above Sweet Waters: Cultural and Natural Change at Port St. Charles, Barbados, c. 1750 BC – AD 1850
