= Roger Mercer =

British archaeologist (1944–2018)

Roger James Mercer OBE FSA HonFSAScot (12 September 1944 – 3 December 2018) was a British archaeologist whose work concentrated on the Neolithic and Bronze Age of the British Isles.

== Biography ==
Between 1970 and 1973 he led the excavations at Carn Brea in Cornwall. and then went on to direct the excavations at Hambledon Hill and Grimes Graves, a Neolithic flint mine.

An alumnus of the University of Edinburgh, graduating with MA Honours in Archaeology (1967), he became a lecturer there in 1974, was promoted to Reader in 1982 and was appointed Acting Head of Archaeology (1982–87).

He was elected a Fellow of the Society of Antiquaries in November 1977 and was an Honorary Fellow and past President of the Society of Antiquaries of Scotland.

From 1990 to 2004 he was Secretary of the Royal Commission on the Ancient and Historical Monuments of Scotland (RCAHMS). He retired in 2004 but retained ties with the University of Edinburgh's School of History, Classics and Archaeology, where he was an Honorary Professorial Fellow, until his death in 2018.

Mercer was appointed Officer of the Order of the British Empire (OBE) in the 2004 New Year Honours for services to archaeology.

== Selected works ==
He published widely on prehistoric Britain including:

- Hambledon Hill: A Neolithic Landscape, Edinburgh University Press, 1980
- Farming Practice in British Prehistory, Edinburgh University Press, 1981
- Hambledon Hill, Dorset, England: Excavation and survey of a Neolithic Monument Complex and its Surrounding Landscape, Volume 1 with Frances Healy, English Heritage Archaeological Monographs, 2008
