= Causewayed enclosure =

Prehistoric earthwork

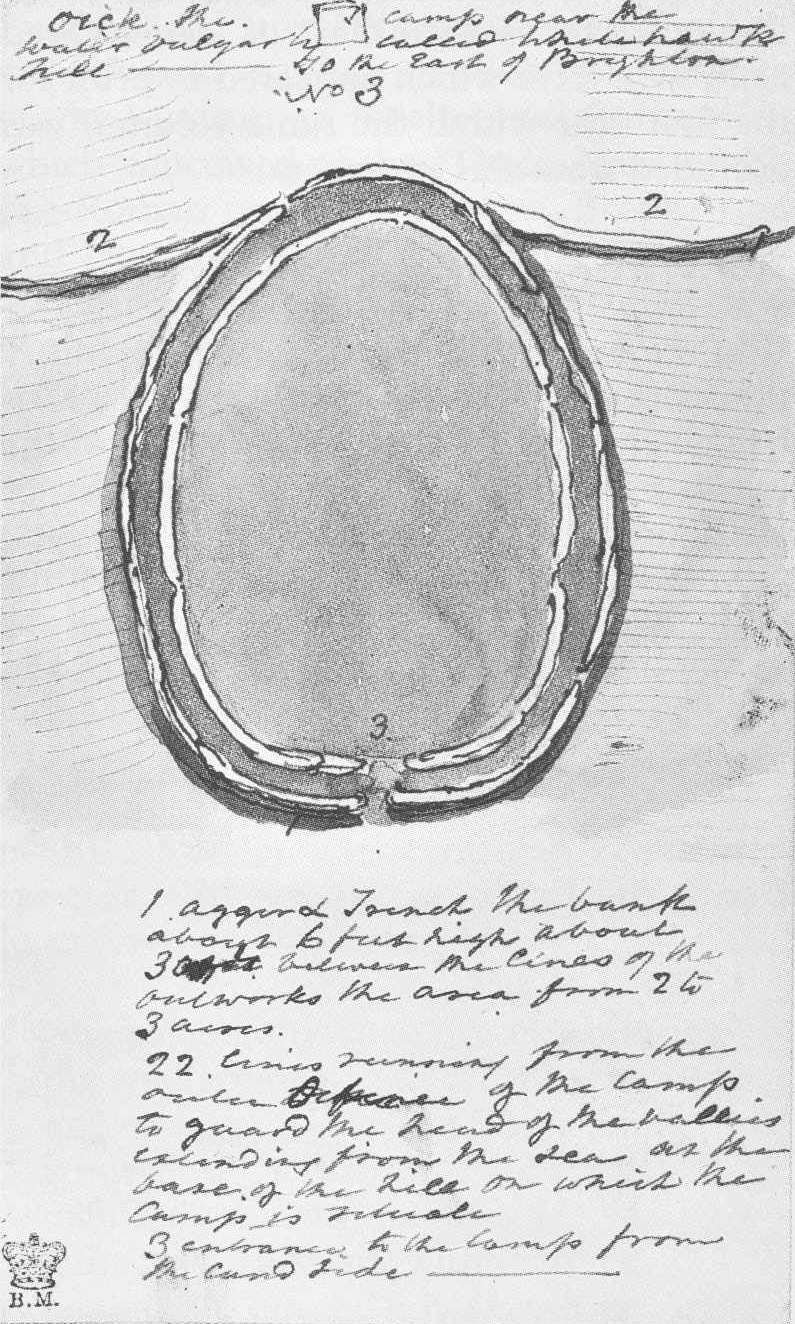
Sketch of Whitehawk camp, a causewayed enclosure

A causewayed enclosure is a type of large prehistoric earthwork common to the early Neolithic in Europe. It is an enclosure marked out by ditches and banks, with a number of causeways crossing the ditches. More than 100 examples are recorded in France and 70 in Southern England and Wales, while further sites are known in Scandinavia, Belgium, Germany, Italy, Ireland and Slovakia.

The term "causewayed enclosure" is now preferred to the older term, causewayed camp, as it has been demonstrated that the sites did not necessarily serve as occupation sites.

Archaeologists have speculated on the purposes of such sites, but have not arrived at a consensus as to their function.

== Construction ==
Causewayed enclosures are often located on hilltop sites, encircled by one to four concentric ditches with an internal bank. Enclosures located in lowland areas are generally larger than hilltop ones. Crossing the ditches at intervals are causeways which give the monuments their names. It appears that the ditches were excavated in sections, leaving the wide causeways intact in between. They should not be confused with segmented, or causewayed ring ditches, which are smaller and are thought to relate only to funerary activity, or with hillforts, which appeared later and had a definite defensive function. With regard to defensive functionality, however, evidence of timber palisades has been found at some sites such as Hambledon Hill.

== Function ==
Archaeological evidence implies that the enclosures were visited occasionally by Neolithic groups rather than being permanently occupied. The presence of human remains in the banks and ditches of the enclosures has been seen as an attempt by the builders to connect their ancestors with the land and thus begin to anchor themselves to specific areas. Longitudinal sections excavated along the ditches by archaeologists suggest that the builders repeatedly redug the ditches and each time deliberately deposited pottery and human and animal bones, apparently as a regular ritual. Environmental archaeology suggests that the European landscape was heavily forested when the enclosures were built; they were rare clearings in the woodland that were used for various social and economic activities.

In the 1970s the archaeologist Peter Drewett suggested seven possible functions for the sites:

- Settlement
- Defence
- Pens for Cattle
- Trade centres
- Communal meeting places for feasting and other social activities
- Cult/ritual centres
- Burial sites

Other interpretations have seen the causeways as symbolic of multi-directional access to the site by scattered communities, the enclosures as funerary centres for excarnation or the construction of the site being a communal act of creation by a fragmented society.

Animal remains (especially cattle bone), domestic waste and pottery have been found at the sites, however there has been limited evidence of any structures. In some locations, such as Windmill Hill, Avebury, evidence of human occupation predates the enclosure. Generally, it appears that the ditches were permitted to silt up, even while the camps were in use, and then re-excavated episodically. It is unlikely that they had a strong defensive purpose. The earthworks may have been designed to keep out wild animals rather than people. The sequential addition of second, third and fourth circuits of banks and ditches may have come about through growing populations adding to the significance of their peoples' monument over time. In some cases, they appear to have evolved into more permanent settlements.

Most causewayed enclosures have been ploughed away in the intervening millennia and are recognized through aerial archaeology.

== Dating ==
The first causewayed enclosures were constructed in Western Europe in the fifth millennium BC and by the early third millennium BC; notable regional variations occur in their construction. French examples begin to demonstrate elaborate horn-shaped entrances which are interpreted as being designed to impress from afar rather than serve any practical purpose.

The dates of construction and use of causwayed enclosures in Britain and Ireland were the subject of a seminal study using Bayesian analysis of radiocarbon dates, Gathering Time, which provided unprecedented historical precision for the Neolithic period. This showed that following the start of the Neolithic in Britain, i.e. the arrival of the first farmers in the 41st century BC, the first monuments built were long barrows, which became popular at the end of the 39th century, that is, around 3800 BC (or a few decades later). The fashion for causewayed enclosures took off in the late 38th century, starting in east Britain and rapidly spreading west, with construction peaking in the third quarter of the 37th century. At this time the long barrows were closed up or at least went out of use. Following a lull, a final round of construction of causewayed enclosures happened in the 36th century, and at the same time the usage of existing enclosures (as marked by deposition in the ditches, and continued re-cutting) increased. Some enclosures were in use for only a generation, while others, such as Hambledon Hill, and the type site at Windmill Hill, Avebury, were used for centuries, continuing until the 35th or 34th centuries BC. Throughout this period of primary use, a number of examples were identified of violence and attacks at enclosures. After the 36th century, a new type of monument, the cursus, became popular. All this long preceded the earliest henge monuments, including Stonehenge I.

== Examples ==
Examples of causewayed enclosures include:

=== England ===
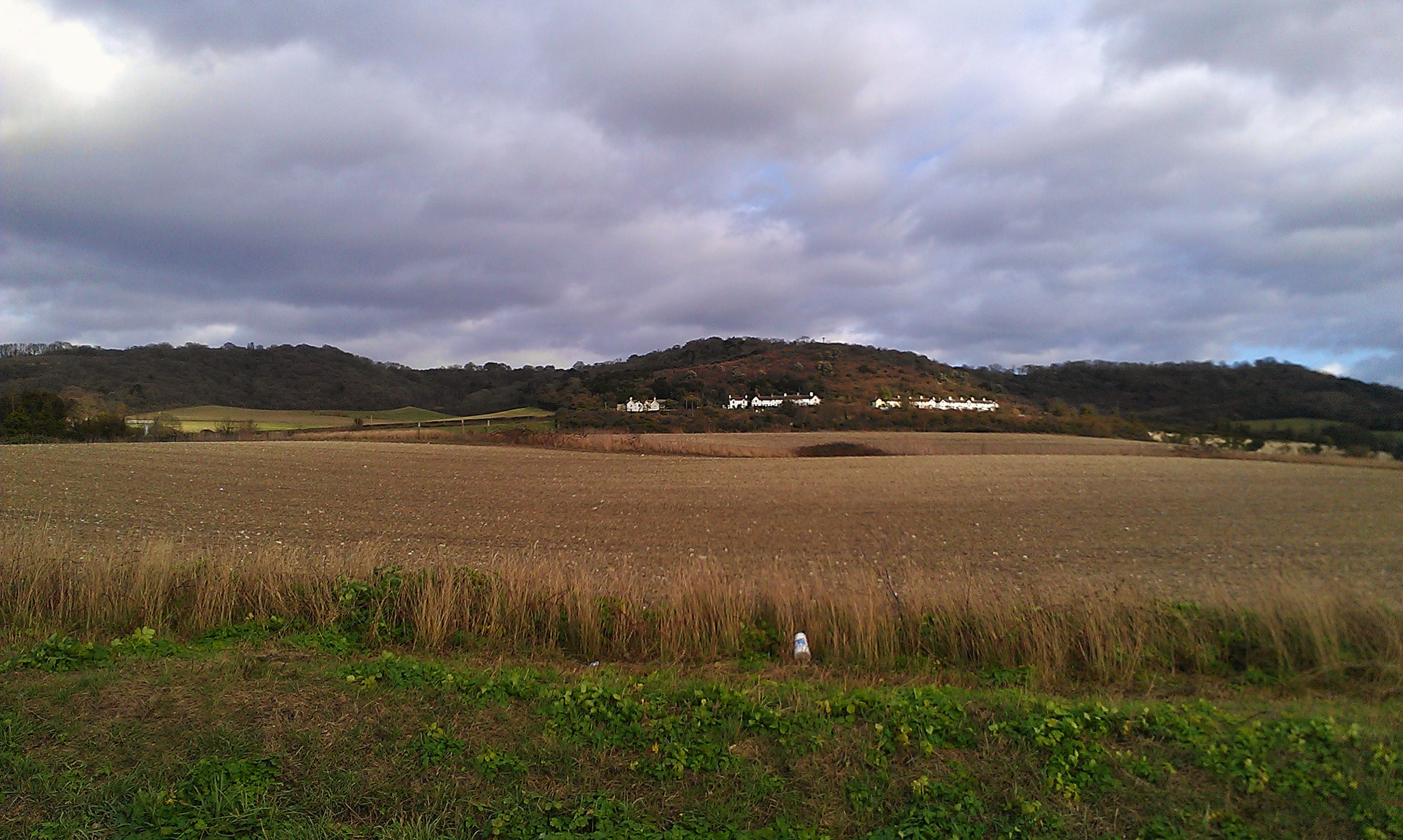
Causewayed enclosure at Burham, Kent.

- Barkhale Camp, West Sussex
- Combe Hill, East Sussex
- Crickley Hill, Gloucestershire
- Freston causewayed enclosure, Suffolk
- Hambledon Hill, Dorset
- Hembury, Devon
- Knap Hill, Wiltshire
- Maiden Bower, Bedfordshire
- Offham Hill, East Sussex
- Rams Hill (on the Berkshire Downs)
- Robin Hood's Ball near Stonehenge
- The Trundle, West Sussex
- Whitehawk Camp, East Sussex
- Windmill Hill, Avebury, Wiltshire
- Some tor enclosures, such as that at Carn Brea, are believed to have served a similar purpose in south western Britain.

=== France ===
- Champ Durand (in french)
- Chez Reine near Semussac
- Diconche
- La Coterelle
- La Mastine

=== Ireland ===
- Donegore, County Antrim
- Magheraboy Causewayed Enclosure, County Sligo

=== Portugal ===
- Castro of Zambujal in its second construction phase.

=== Spain ===
- Monte da Lagoa in Narón, Galicia.

=== Germany ===
- Albersdorf-Dieksknöll
- Büdelsdorf
