= Dunbar Medal =

Dunbar Medal may refer to:

- a medal issued after the Battle of Dunbar (1650) called the Dunbar Medal
- a medal awarded since 1973 by the European Water Association and named in honour of William P. Dunbar
