= General Lumsden (disambiguation) =

Herbert Lumsden (1897–1945) was a British Army lieutenant general. General Lumsden may also refer to:

- Frederick Lumsden (1872–1918), Royal Marines brigadier general
- Harry Burnett Lumsden (1821–1896), British Bengal Army lieutenant general
- James Lumsden (military officer) (1598–1660), Scottish lieutenant general
- Peter Lumsden (1829–1918), British Indian Army general
