= Peterborough ware =

Pottery style of the British Neolithic

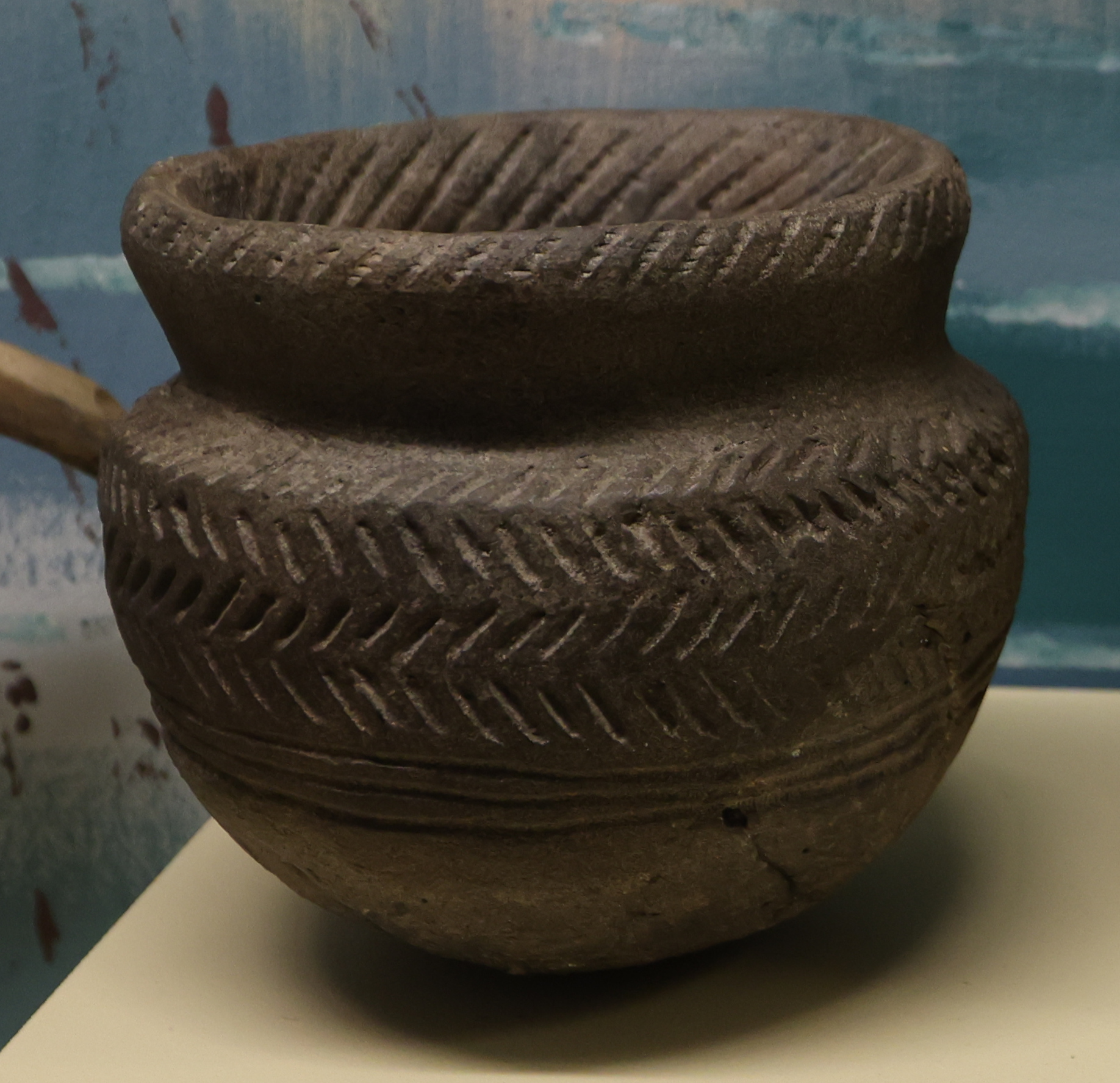
A Peterborough ware mortlake style bowl at Peterborough Museum and Art Gallery

Peterborough ware is a decorated British Neolithic pottery style of the early to middle English Neolithic. Named after Peterborough, the nearest city to where the style was first discovered, it is found in the region of South-East England and East Anglia. it is known for the impressed pits made by bone or wood implements in its sides. Whipped cord was also used to make circular 'maggot' patterns. Ebbsfleeet ware, Fengate ware and Mortlake ware have been identified as subdivisions of Peterborough ware.

The term was introduced by R. A. Smith based on examples found at Fengate, near Peterborough. It originally referred to all neolithic impressed ware, without restricting by location, but now primarily refers to finds of this type in southern and eastern England.

The earliest form of Peterborough ware is known as Ebbsfleet style and had minimal decoration, although this later became more complex. Peterborough ware may have evolved from the earlier Grimston-Lyles Hill ware, around 3500 BC. Later varieties are known as Mortlake and Fengate sub-styles although the sequential chronological scheme of evolution from Ebbsfleet, through Mortlake to Fengate established by Smith (1956), has been called into question by a reading of associated radiocarbon data (Kinnes and Gibson 1997). While this reading suggests all three subgroups were actually more or less contemporary, current research at the University of Sheffield suggests this may still be a contentious issue.

Archaeologists have described the makers of Peterborough ware as the Peterborough culture, but the term has fallen out of favour as further discoveries have cast doubt on the idea that a single unified society produced these artefacts.

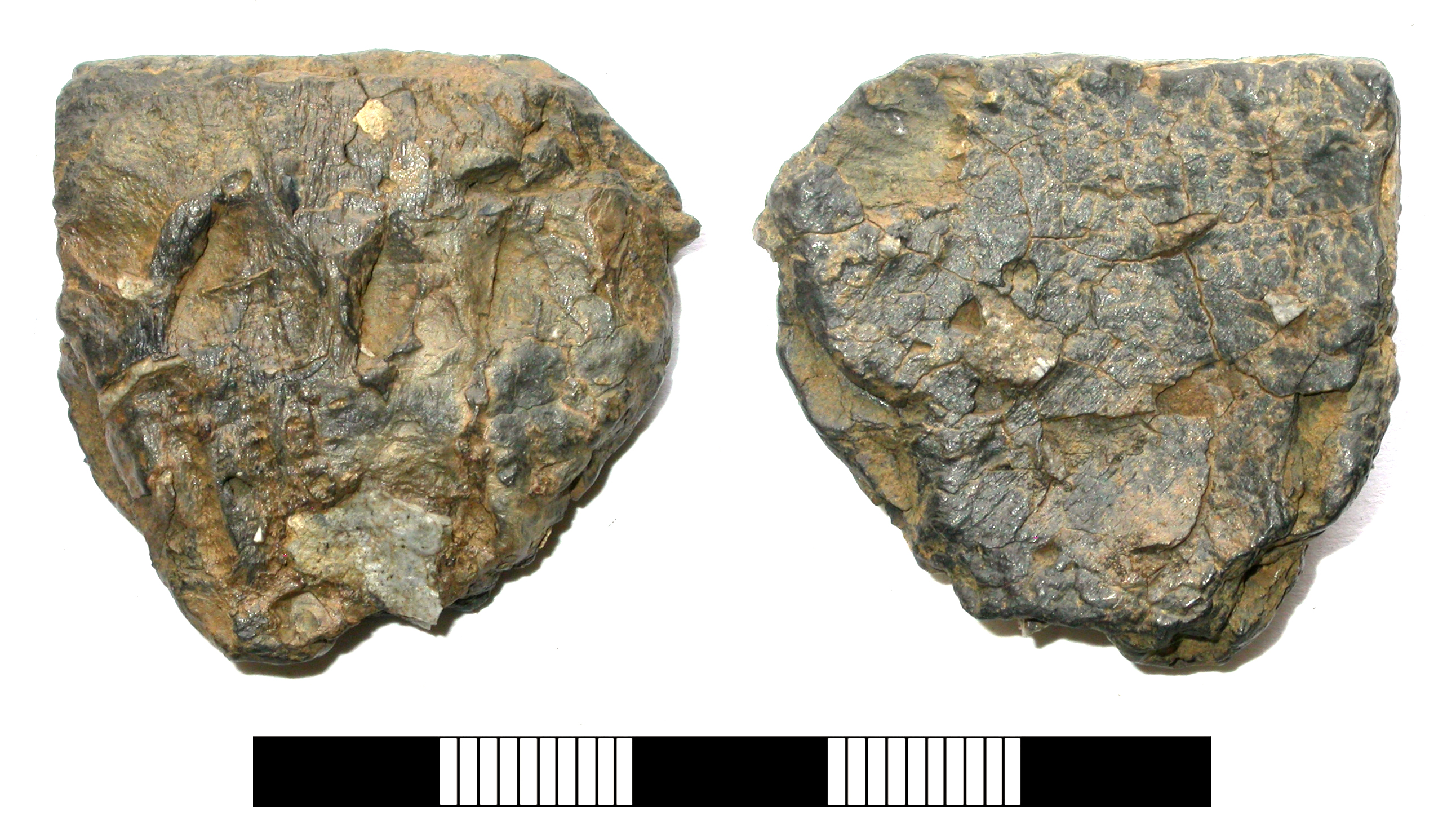
Neolithic, Sherd of Peterborough Ware (FindID 523895)

== Sources ==
- Gibson, Alex; Woods, Ann (1997) [1990]. Prehistoric Pottery for the Archaeologist (2nd ed.). London: Leicester University Press. ISBN 0-7185-1954-X.
