= Western Neolithic ware =

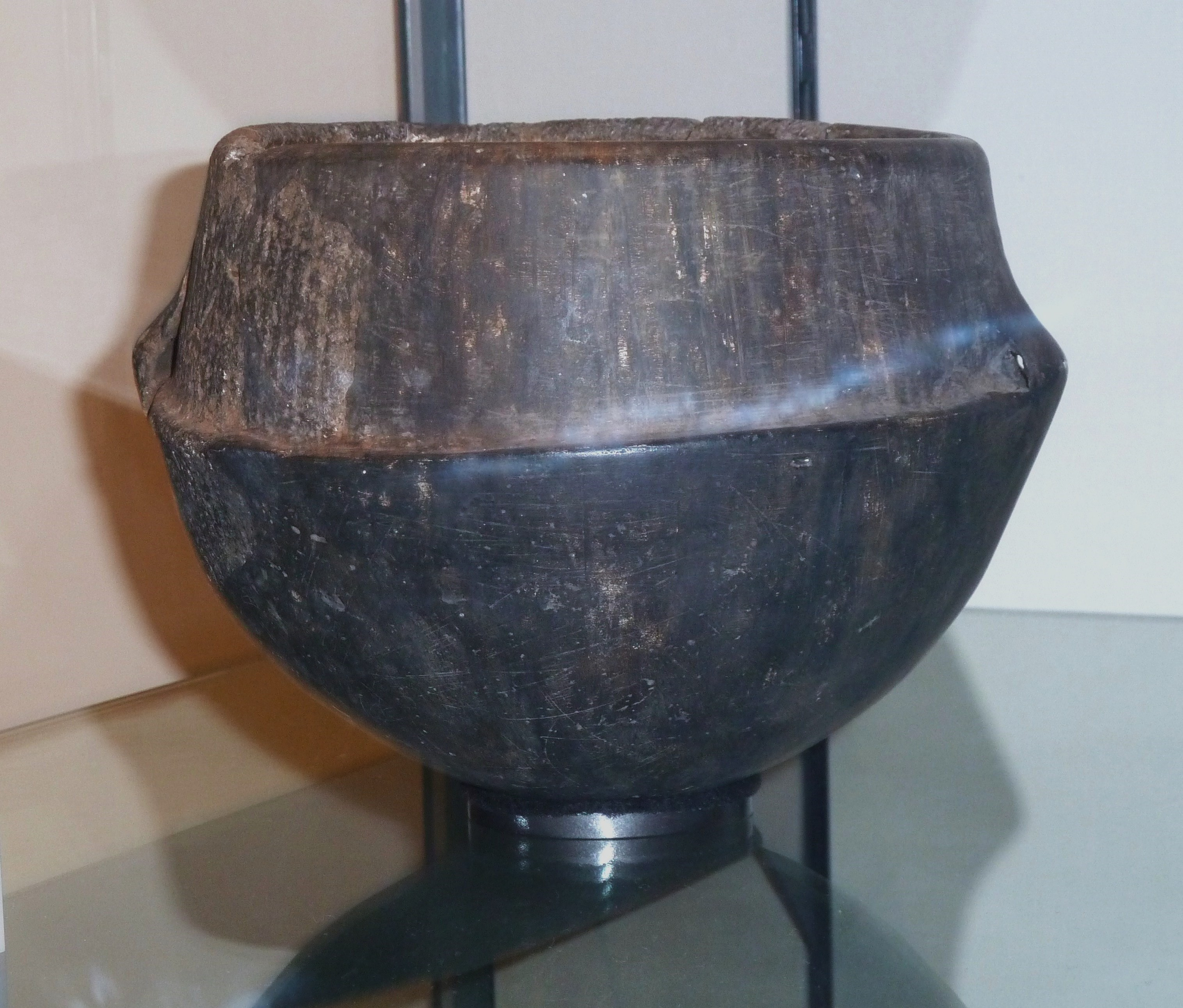
Pottery of the Ballymarlagh Style

Western Neolithic ware, also known as Western style Neolithic pottery or New Stone Age pottery in the Western-style, is a type of pottery of the Early and Middle New Stone Age, which is found in the western parts of the British Isles and especially in Ireland. It was defined in 1961 by Humphrey Case (1918–2009). He described the pottery as usually round-bottomed bowls, which were normally smooth, thin-walled and hard, usually dark brown and sometimes with a profile at the shoulder or area of the mouth.

Four subgroups were recognised in Ireland:

- Dunmurry style,
- Ballymarlagh style
- Limerick style I (round bottomed)
- Limerick style II (shallow/flat)
- Lyles Hill style.

Over the course of time they were increasingly decorated. Simple incised patterns on the shoulder created with a piece of wood may possibly represent a leather case.

Pots decorated with cord patterns are so typical of Ireland that they became known as Ballyalton Bowls, named after the court tomb where they were found. Similar pots were found in the west of Scotland in graves. There were referred to there as Beacharra ware.

Whilst smooth and decorated containers are typical of Irish court and portal tombs, they are rarely found in their associated settlement sites, or even on those of the builders of the passage tombs. In fact, they were an unusual form pottery everywhere during the Neolithic Period.
