= British Neolithic pottery =

Era of British prehistory pottery

Pottery began to appear at the start of the British Neolithic period, along with other changes in lifestyle. These changes included a switch to settled agriculture, as opposed to hunting and gathering.

== Pottery types ==
The earliest pots in Britain appear in the south-east, shortly before 4000 BC. The earliest style of pottery is known as Carinated Bowl; these pots usually have distinct carinations (sharply turned shoulders) and burnished finishes. Carinated Bowls (CB) are not decorated, except for a few instances of grooves created by fingertips dragged down or along the bowl surface while the clay was still wet. Lugs (protrusions from the side, presumably used as handles) are only known from one example. Prehistoric potters generally incorporated other materials such as shell or lithic (stone) fragments into their clay, to assist with releasing the water of plasticity and reduce cracking during firing, and to help stabilize the fabric of the pot. Carinated Bowls have small lithic inclusions and walls often as thin as 4–10 mm, so they would have required a great deal of skill to produce. Radiocarbon dating has established that the “package” of Neolithic material culture that is associated with CB spread very quickly in Britain, and it is likely that this is associated with the migration into Britain of groups of farmers from the continent, though the details are still debated.

Regional variations begin to appear in about 3800. The earliest variation is Plain Bowl, with a wider range of basic forms than Carinated Bowl, including high shoulders, S-shaped rims, developed rims, some closed forms, and coarser fabrics than the thin-walled CB. Plain Bowl, like CB, is widely distributed across the British Isles. Hembury Ware is a specific type of Plain Bowl found across the south-west, which uses a gabbroic clay that has been traced to the Lizard peninsula in Cornwall.

Plain Bowls were followed by Decorated Bowls, by about 3700 BC. By the middle of the millennium, Carinated Bowls ceased to be made; Plain Bowls and Decorated Bowls lasted until about 3300 BC.

These three styles were originally collectively known as Grimston-Lyles Hill ware, though this is no longer a universally used term. (Note: For example, The Handbook of British Archaeology, published in 2008, refers to these styles as Grimston-Lyles Hill, but Gathering Time, a 2011 re-analysis of radiocarbon dates in Neolithic causewayed enclosures, does not use the term.)

Hembury ware starts to appear around 3750 BC in the southwest. These pots were made from materials found at gabbroic outcrops in Cornwall, and were traded as far east as Dorset and Wiltshire. The bowls are rounded, and the sides may be rounded or carinated, with or without lugs (external protrusions that may have been handles). Trumpet lugs, with ends that look like the bell of a trumpet, occur only on Hembury ware and imitative forms.

By 3300 BC, Cardium pottery, also known as Impressed ware, began to appear. These bowls had decorations made by pressing various items into the clay before firing: reeds, sticks, bones and twisted cords were used, for example. The term Peterborough ware originally defined a sequence of styles of Impressed Ware, from Ebbsfleet ware, which was thought to be the earliest, through Mortlake ware to Fengate ware, the latest. Since the late 1990s evidence has accumulated that this sequence is not as clear-cut as was once thought.

== Sources ==
- Bayliss, Alex; Healy, Frances; Whittle, Alasdair; Cooney, Gabriel (2015) [2011]. "Neolithic narratives: British and Irish enclosures in their timescapes". In Whittle, Alasdair; Healy, Frances; Bayliss, Alex (eds.). Gathering Time: Dating the Early Neolithic Enclosures of Southern Britain and Ireland. Oxford: Oxbow. pp. 682–847. ISBN 978-1-84217-425-8.
- Barclay, Alistair J.; et al. (2018). Dating the earliest Neolithic ceramics of Wessex (Report). English Heritage.
- Gibson, Alex (2002). Prehistoric Pottery in Britain & Ireland. Stroud, UK: Tempus. ISBN 0-7524-1930-7.
- Gibson, Alex; Woods, Ann (1997) [1990]. Prehistoric Pottery for the Archaeologist (2nd ed.). London: Leicester University Press. ISBN 0-7185-1954-X.
- Malone, Caroline (2011) [2001]. Neolithic Britain and Ireland. Stroud, UK: The History Press. ISBN 978-0-7524-1442-3.
- Sheridan, Alison (2007). Whittle, Alasdair; Cummings, Vicki (eds.). From Picardie to Pickering and Pencraig Hill? New information on the 'Carinated Bowl Neolithic' in northern Britain (PDF). Oxford: Oxford University Press. pp. 441–492. ISBN 9780197264140.
