= Broxmouth =

- Shown within East Lothian
- 55°59′19″N 2°28′50″W
- Location: Lothian, Scottish Lowlands, Scotland

Site notes
- Architectural styles: Iron Age hillfort, roundhouse
- Governing body: Historic Environment Scotland

The Broxmouth hillfort is an Iron Age hillfort consisting of multiple roundhouses, a series of fortifications, and a cemetery. Broxmouth is located in East Lothian near Dunbar. The land surrounding Broxmouth is some of the richest farmlands in Scotland, and as a result this region produced a significant amount of cropmark evidence for late prehistoric settlements, including Broxmouth. In addition to agriculture, Broxmouth hillfort is located about 600 metres from the North Sea coast, providing the inhabitants access to waters for fishing. During the early centuries of its occupation, Broxmouth was one of largest settlements in the region.

Very thorough excavations of Broxmouth were carried out from 1977 to 1979 in response to the construction of a concrete works on the site. The excavations revealed a complex set of enclosures, multiple well preserved multi-phase roundhouses, and a range of artefacts. The excavations also revealed an extensive assemblage of animal bones and shells, as well as an Iron Age cemetery. It is unusual for Iron Age artefacts like these to survive, and it is quite rare for formal cemeteries such as the one at Broxmouth to be uncovered. As a result, Broxmouth provides valuable information about Iron Age Scottish settlements and burial practices.

== Excavation ==
Broxmouth hillfort was first recognised by Dr. St Joseph in 1956, thanks to aerial photographs showing the cropmarks associated with the site. Further aerial photography was undertaken in 1972 by John Dewar, by Fairey Surveys Ltd. in 1974, and by the Royal Commission on the Ancient and Historical Monuments of Scotland from 1976 to 1978.

Rescue excavations of Broxmouth were carried out between 1977 and 1978 shortly before the site was destroyed during the process of quarrying for the construction of Lafarge Tarmac Cement Works. The excavations were carried out by Peter Hill under the direction of Ian Armit of the University of Bradford. Because the site was going to be completely destroyed in the process building the concrete plant, it was of the utmost importance for the site to be investigated and recorded as thoroughly as possible. Many high-quality radio carbon dates were recorded at Broxmouth, the quality of which had not been possible before. These radio carbon dates provided a detailed perspective of the chronology of Broxmouth. The excavation at Broxmouth is the most complete excavation of a Scottish hillfort to date, and is widely considered one of the most important Iron Age sites in Britain, as it provides new insights into life in Scotland from 600 BCE to 200 CE.

Though excavations were undertaken between 1977 and 1978, a full analysis of the excavation was not published until 2013. In 2008 Historic Scotland negotiated the transfer of the archive of documents associated with the Broxmouth excavations to the University of Bradford, where it was prepared for publication. This programme of post-excavation analysis took place at the University of Bradford from 2008 to 2013. This programme was funded by Historic Scotland and the Arts and Humanities Research Council. The analysis was published in British Archaeology.

== Archaeology ==
Broxmouth is a fairly typical hillfort in terms of size and form. The excavation of Broxmouth is generally considered to have been the most complete excavation of a Scottish hillfort to date. However, this minimizes the effects of truncation on the remains of the site. A majority of the structures and deposits that were originally present at Broxmouth have been lost, and no archaeological remains survived. The most striking instance of truncation is the result of modern ploughing and is particularly present in the northern and eastern parts of the site, where plough damage had destroyed all archeological features other than the deep ditches of the hillfort. Aside from a few rare areas of paving that survived beneath the ploughed soil in the southwest and central parts of the interior, archaeological deposits tended to only survive in areas where they were more protected. Areas where deposits tended to survive include within hollows formed by the topography of the hill, as negative features, in areas covered by and protected by later deposits, and where structures had sunk into the remains of infilled ditches as features settled and consolidated. What was preserved and excavated only represents a small portion of what would have originally been present at the site.

=== Settlement Sequence ===
Broxmouth hillfort was inhabited for around 1000 years. There is evidence of human activity dating back as far as 3000 BCE, including two flint scatters on the flanks of the hill and a sherd of late Neolithic pottery in a small pit in cemetery area. Permanent settlement was established around 600 BCE, when a wooden stockade was constructed around the hilltop. Broxmouth was then continuously inhabited until 200 CE, when the Roman occupation of the area ended. Each generation built on top of what the previous generation had built. The layers of construction allowed the excavation team to identify different stages of construction and occupation.

When Broxmouth was originally excavated accelerator mass spectrometry was not available, so the initial phasing of the site was developed using stratigraphic evidence and artefactual and structural typology. As a result, the currently accepted chronology that was published in the 2013 post-excavation analyses An Inherited Place: Broxmouth Hillfort and the South-East Scottish Iron Age is quite different from original phasing developed by Hill. One of the elements that was most vital to the construction of a chronology for Broxmouth has been a Baysian analysis of the radiocarbon dates, which was possible thanks to the large quantity of established dates and the presence of long stratigraphic chains. This allowed the ranges of potential dates to be constrained and refined, and for outliers to be identified. The phasing has been restricted to within the Iron Age due to the limited amount of evidence for earlier activity, which was likely confined to the middle Neolithic period. Within the Iron Age there was no period of significant abandonment besides the period between Phases 6 and 7.

==== Evidence for Neolithic use ====
Unlike the rest of the area at and around the hillfort, the cemetery provides evidence for earlier Neolithic activity. One small pit contained hazelnuts and a few sherds of late Neolithic pottery. Another stone feature from the Neolithic period provided more pottery, chert, and animal bone. These artefacts have been lost since excavation, but it is possible that they represented the remains of a denuded funerary monument.

==== Phase 1 (640/570 - 490/430 BCE) ====
Phase 1 is the earliest period of permanent Iron Age occupation, but this period predates the construction of the hillfort. The earliest surviving element from this period and immediate predecessor to the hillfort was a large, palisaded enclosure with a shallow external ditch. The ditch was infilled at some point in Phase 1. Immediately outside of the palisade wall, built on top of the infilled ditches, were the remains of two roundhouses and a series of timber-built structures. There is evidence of early ironworking activity dating to Phase 1. Additionally, there were two inhumation graves (Graves 1 and 2) from Phase 1. Aside from the palisade trench and the graves, deposits associated with Phase 1 only survive beneath the Phase 2 and 3 ramparts in the West Entrance area, which protected the Phase 1 deposits from erosion. Despite the limited survival of deposits and structures, the finds from Phase 1 indicate that Broxmouth may have been a "substantial early Iron Age settlement."

==== Phase 2 (490/430 - 395/375 BCE) ====
The hillfort was constructed at the beginning of Phase 2 in two stages of construction, Phase 2a and Phase 2b. In Phase 2a an inner ditch and rampart was constructed, and in Phase 2b a middle ditch and corresponding rampart was constructed. There were two entrances to the hillfort during Phase 2, one on the eastern side of the hillfort on the western side. The only surviving evidence of entrance features dates to Phase 2b and was near the West Entrance. The entrance feature consisted of a significant length of early rampart material and the remains of an elaborate gateway. The evidence for the Phase 2 ditches was patchy, as the ditches had been almost completely destroyed during the recutting that took place in Phase 3. No domestic structures survive from Phase 2.

==== Phase 3 (395/375 - 295/235 BCE) ====
Phase 3 is characterised by a complex sequence of entrance works, which included the construction of a major gateway structure. The enclosure system was significantly reworked at the beginning of Phase 3. One of the most significant changes was that the West Entrance from Phase 2 was blocked by the newly constructed Phase 3 rampart and the entry causeways from Phase 2 were removed when the ditches were recut. The South-west Entrance was constructed in this period to replace the West Entrance. Over the course of Phase 3 (which can be broken into four subphases, Subphases 3a-3d) the hillfort was gradually expanded outward. The hillfort initially developed successive univallate enclosures, eventually developing into a partially trivallate enclosure with the enclosure of a complete Outer ditch and a partial Outermost Ditch. At its largest (in Subphase 3d) the enclosures contained about 1.5 hectares (though this doesn't account for space within the enclosure system that was taken up by ramparts or walls). At the end of Phase 3 the ditches were infilled. No domestic structures from Phase 3 have survived.

==== Phase 4 (295/235 - 235/210 BCE) ====
It appears that the settlement expanded outward beyond the inner rampart after the ditches were infilled in Phase 3. Several sections of the infilled ditches show evidence of structures from Phase 4 that had sunk into the infill material as it settled and consolidated. This evidence was preserved best in a stretch of inner dish near the West Entrance, where a series of roundhouses were preserved. More ephemeral evidence was found in other parts of the infilled ditch.

==== Phase 5 (235/210 - 100/60 BCE) ====
After the houses from Phase 4 were abandoned, the inner ditch at the West Entrance was filled with a series of midden deposits. The midden used likely originated from domestic waste and construction activity taking place in the interior. No structures or artefacts from Phase 5 were found surviving in situ. The process of infilling the ditches continued into Phase 6, as a result it was not always possible to determine which phase a specific deposit belonged to. No domestic structures from Phase 5 survive, though a small inhumation cemetery was established to the north of the hillfort.

==== Phase 6 (100/60bce - 155/210 CE) ====
A majority of the surviving structures within the interior of the hillfort are from Phase 6. In areas of the interior that were not severely truncated a series of tightly packed stone- and timber-walled roundhouses were revealed, indicating that the settlement was densely occupied. Several of the structures show evidence of extended periods of occupations and periodic remodelling. The settlement seems to have survived two to three centuries of continuous use into the period of Antonine occupation, if not later. It appeared that in the beginning of Phase 6 a new enclosure bank was constructed along the course of the inner rampart. Though it would not have survived for the entirety of Phase 6, the new enclosure bank was accompanied by a monumental timber entryway. There is evidence for the renewal of the enclosure wall at the South-west Entrance.

==== Phase 7 (420 - 540 CE) ====
Between Phase 6 and Phase 7 Broxmouth underwent a significant period of abandonment. After this period of abandonment a single inhumation grave (Grave 4) was interred in the western part of the interior. It was not possible to determine if this burial was an isolated event, or if Grave 4 was part of a more extensive cemetery in the northern part of the interior that had been destroyed by ploughing. It is uncertain why Broxmouth hillfort was abandoned. It was likely completely abandoned by 210 CE, possibly as a result of Antonine withdrawal in the 160s and the Severin invasion of 208 CE.

=== Finds ===
Isotopic analysis suggests that the diet of the inhabitants of Broxmouth were predominantly terrestrial with low levels of consumption of marine protein, likely 5-10 percent. Substantial middens were revealed during excavation and a large volume of animal bone was preserved, suggesting that community's economy was dominated by the keeping of cattle and sheep. The presence of querns also showed that the inhabitants relied on arable crops. Additionally, there is evidence for deep-sea fishing, which is unusual for Iron Age Britain. Due to nature of the geology at Broxmouth there is a higher than usual rate of survival of animal bones, which don't unusually survive in the region. The presence of these animal bones could provide additional insights into the Iron Age pastoral economy.

A large amount of shell, bone, slag, small amounts of local pottery and worked bone, stone, and bronze have been recovered. The preservation of such a wide variety of artefacts is unusual for Iron Age Scottish sites, but the calcareous soils of the area lent themselves to the preservation of a variety of bones (both worked and unworked), pottery, artefacts made of copper alloy, and evidence of ironworking.Broxmouth is the site of the earliest identified production and use of steel in the British Isles. Artefacts made of high-carbon steel dating to 490–375 BCE were found. These artefacts were poorly preserved, so it is not possible to determine if these items were tools, weapons, or something for a different purpose.

Objects from the latest phase of inhabitation included items of Roman origins, including Samian ware sherds and pieces of broken glass bangles (Kilbride-Jones types 2 and 3).

== Funerary practices at Broxmouth ==
Evidence of Iron Age funerary practices in Britain is sporadic, especially in terms of formal cemeteries. Broxmouth in particular provides an excellent example of a range of funerary treatments present in Iron Age Scotland. The way that human remains were treated "shed[s] light on complex and changing attitudes to death and the human body in Iron Age Britain."

The human remains from Broxmouth can be categorised into three distinct populations: those interred in the formal cemetery outside of the outer boundaries of the hillfort, those interred in isolated graves within the walls of the fort, and the scattered, disarticulated bone fragments found in domestic and midden contexts. The disarticulated fragments in particular show evidence of violent trauma, and isotopic evidence suggests that they may have been the remains of individuals were not local.

=== Cemetery ===
When a machine trench was being cut across the northernmost ditch of the hillfort eight single inhumation graves and one double burial were discovered. A wide area was subsequently excavated around the burials, and it seems unlikely that the cemetery extended further than was excavated. That being said, the truncation of certain graves, particularly Graves B and C, suggest that there may have originally been more graves that were entirely destroyed by ploughing in the medieval period. Despite the small sample size, the demographics of the cemetery generally reflect what would be expected of a small burial ground. The burials consist of men and women of various ages, and the absence of young children is not unusual for cemeteries such as the one at Broxmouth. All but one of the graves contain the remains of a single individual, and the only double inhumation contains the remains of a young adult and an older child.

Care and effort went into construction of graves, which utilised stone that may have been sourced from decaying ramparts and/or the remains of the late Neolithic monument that the cemetery was centered on. The graves tend to be oval or sub-rectangular, and where the truncation was least extensive they were up to .7 metres in depth. Most of the walls of the graves were lined with thin slabs of stone, though the bases were unlined. Some of the graves were also covered with stone slabs, and in several cases these capstones would not have spanned the entire width of the grave. This indicated that they were possibly laid on top of a backfilled grave, though indications of ridging on the cover slabs from Grave G suggest the slabs may have been supported by a wooden framework that no longer survives. One of the capstones and side slabs of Grave J, which houses a young male, were "decorated with an arc of pecked hollows enhancing the natural limpet scars which are visible across the surface of the stone." The stone caps may have been visible in some of the graves given their elaborate construction and lack of intercutting. The absence of grave goods, large monuments, or significant variation in graves and burials suggest that a relatively egalitarian approach was taken to burial.

The remains were generally oriented along the north–south orientation. There was considerable variation in the placements of the skeletons, and there did not appear to be any correlation in placement to the age or sex of the skeletons. All of the bodies were buried in a crouched or flexed position. For the most part, the skeletons are poorly preserved. Around half of them exhibit significant surface damage as a result of root action and water erosion. This ageing makes it difficult to detect more subtle indicators of trauma. Of all of the skeletons who could be assigned a sex after excavation, 4 were male and 6 female. Two sets of the remains were those of non-adults; Grave G contained the remains of an adolescent around 12–13 years of age, and Grave G, the double inhumation, contained the remains of a child aged 9–10 years of age alongside a young woman, aged 18–25. The bones were interwoven, suggesting that they were buried together, but the age gap suggests that they were likely not mother and child.

Skeleton 12's sagittal suture fused prematurely, a form of craniosynostosis. A number of skeletons show some dental pathology in form of periodontal disease, dental calculus, and enamel hypoplasia. The lack of evidence for joint disease is unusual, but this may reflect the relatively young ages of death of those interred in the cemetery, or it may simply be a reflection of the poor surface condition of the bones. There is no evidence of pre-mortem or peri-mortem trauma on any of the skeletons interred in the cemetery. The osteoarchaeologist who carried out the initial examinations of the remains from the Broxmouth cemetery jokingly described the individuals as "nice ordinary people who didn't get into any sort of trouble" in a letter to Jean Comrie, excavator of the cemetery.

=== Isolated burials ===
Graves 1-4 were excavated within the defensive border of the hillfort. Graves 1-3 each contained the remains of young females. Like the graves in the cemetery, the remains in the isolated burials are oriented north–south or south–north axis. Despite this similarity to the burials in the cemetery, the isolated burials are quite distinct from the individuals interred in the cemetery.

==== Grave 1 ====
Grave 1 was located just outside the entrance of one of the houses within the hillfort (House 2). It was possible to assign a sex to the skeleton, and they were assigned female. Mass spectrometry dates indicate that the individual was buried there several centuries before the house was constructed. The grave survived as a shallow scoop with no evidence of any stone lining. The individual was placed in the grave in a "tightly contracted position, unlike the looser crouched or flexed position of those in the cemetery." The ribs on both sides of their body displayed healed fractures, and there is evidence in their bones of a lung infection at the time of death. Additionally, enamel hypoplasia in their teeth indicates that they may have experienced some issues with tooth growth around age four, possibly as result of malnutrition. They likely died between 520 and 390 BCE, which is significantly earlier than the cemetery burials. The individual in Grave 1's skull displayed the premature closure of sagittal suture.

==== Grave 2 ====
Grave 2 was located in the southern part of the hillfort's interior and contained the remains of an individual who was biologically female and aged 18–25 years of age. The individual was buried in a tightly crouched position and laid face down in their grave. The skeleton showed perimortem fractures to their right radius and both hands. This type of injury likely occurred when the individual fell heavily onto their outstretched arms, and this may have been the result of an accident or of a violent attack. It is likely that these injuries were connected with the individual's death. The skeleton is generally poorly preserved as a result of the truncation of the grave. As a result, it is not possible to determine whether these were isolated injuries or part of more extensive skeletal damage. In addition to the injury to their arm and hands, their skeleton shows signs of a slight compression fracture in the fifth lumbar vertebra that may be the result of heavy lifting and carrying over extended an period. The individual's leg bones are displaced in relation to the rest of their skeleton. This indicated that the grave may have been disturbed at some point after initial decomposition (the face-down position that the remains were found in may also be a result of this disturbance), or the skeleton may have also been partially disarticulated at time of burial. Like the individual in Grave 1, their teeth show evidence of enamel hypoplasia. Mass spectrometry results indicated that the individual died sometime between 760 and 400 BCE, a similar date range to Grave 1. The individual in Grave 2's skull displayed the premature closure of sagittal suture.

==== Grave 3 ====
Grave 3 was located by the southwest entrance of the hillfort and originated from the period when the hillfort was at the height of its structural complexity. The body was assigned female after examination and was buried in a grave lined with stone slabs that protruded from the roadway that passed through the nearby entrance. The grave seems to have been filled in at some point, which suggests that the burial took place during an episode of resurfacing of the entrance. The position of the grave and the visible stone lining suggest that the grave may have been deliberately visible to those visiting Broxmouth. Like Graves 1 and 2, the individual interred in Grave 3 was buried in a tightly crouched position. They were sixteen to eighteen years of age at the time of death. The tightness of the burial position suggests that the individual's body may have been bound, and bone point found in the chest region was likely some form of fixing for the binding cloth. The skeleton shows no evidence of violent trauma, but there is evidence of a severe case of cribra orbitali on the roofs of the orbits, which is possibly indicative of some form of anaemia. The lesions show rounded margins, which indicate that healing had occurred. This implies that the individual likely dealt with this condition as a child. It is likely that the individual died at some point between 370 and 160 BCE. This is significantly later than the other isolated burials.

==== Grave 4 ====
Grave 4 contained the remains of a young man. The remains were in the supine position and oriented along the west-southwest-east-northeast axis. The individual buried in Grave 4 died and was buried many centuries after the other isolated burials, and their death appears to date to after the abandonment of the hillfort.

==== Conclusions ====
Like Skeleton 12 from the cemetery, the individuals buried in Graves 1 and 2 displayed the premature closure of sagittal suture. The presence of three individuals with such similarities in such a small sample size is unusual and may suggest genetic link between the individuals from the early Iron Age graves in the hillfort's interior and the later burial in the cemetery.

Because of the isolated nature of the individual burials and the small sample size, it is difficult to draw general conclusions about the nature of said burials. Even so, the demographic consistency, unusual bodily treatments, and the prevalence of atypical pathology are striking, especially when compared to the cemetery population. There are a number of possible explanations for the consistency between the burials in the isolated burials. It is possible that these isolated burials are a result of an earlier burial tradition that was limited to a small sector of the population, but this would not adequately account for the high incidence of pathology. The individuals interred in the isolated burials may have married outside of the community and been returned to their home community after death, which could explain the unusual treatments of bodies. For example, the binding of Skeleton 3 may reflect how the body may have been transported, and the partial disarticulation of Skeleton 2 could reflect the time passing between death and burial. However, this explanation does not explain the prevalence of the pathology in these skeletons. The burials may represent the deliberate interment of low-status women as sacrifices or foundational offerings, practices which are frequently documented in the ethnographic record. The incidence of pathology and prone burials may reflect potential maltreatment and denigration in life, and would also account for the injuries of the individual in Grave 2. These graves may have also been the graves of witches or other feared individuals who were isolated in death. The burial position and pathology could again reflect maltreatment and denigration in life.

=== Disarticulated fragments ===
A series of twenty two disarticulated fragments or groups of fragments were found across the Broxmouth. These fragments were found in a wide range of contexts and were from a variety of time periods within the period of occupation of the hillfort. Five of the fragments were found within roundhouses, including two that seem to have been deliberately included in the wall core of House 4. Most of the rest of the fragments were found in ditch deposits. Generally, the distribution of the fragments reflected the relative volumes of sediment excavated from various parts of the site. There is a notable concentration in the ditch terminals at the southwest entrance of the hillfort during phase three. Thirteen of the twenty two bone fragments are from the cranium or mandibles, and only nine of the fragments are from the post-cranium. This reflects the now-recognized bias towards the retention and deposition of skull fragments seen in Iron Age sites across Britain and beyond. A majority of the fragments are from adults. Only two examples, Fragment 7 and Fragment 17, were from the skeletons of younger individuals. A sex could be assigned to only two of the fragments, both were female.

The bone fragments are generally poorly preserved and show evidence of abrasion, erosion, and root etching. Additionally, some of the bone fragments show evidence of exposure prior to deposition; For example, Fragment 4 (the right part of a pelvis) shows evidence of exposure to sunlight, which resulted in the bleaching of the surface. For example, Fragment six, a right humerus, displays longitudinal cracking on the shaft of the bone that indicates exposure to sunlight during decomposition. Fragment 6 also shows evidence of being gnawed on by an animal, likely a dog. This indicates that the bones were exposed and that animals had access to the bones during decomposition.

Proportionally, there is an exceptionally high rate of evidence of violent trauma. Six of the fragments display perimortem fractures or cutmarks. Though this is a small number, it represents roughly 25% of the samples. The fragments originated from a wide range of dates, which indicated that violent events occurred at multiple points throughout the history of Broxmouth, as opposed to the fragments being associated with a single, concentrated period of violence. The demography of the disarticulated fragments, while extremely limited, is more likely the result of raiding than a battle.

One unique instance of perimortem trauma is evident on Fragment 22, the distal left femur of an adult person. Fragment 22 displays perimortem cut marks to the articular surface, which would have been difficult to access while the individual was alive. Thus, this may be evidence of deliberate postmortem disarticulation. Fragment 11, a fragment of a rear right parietal bone, was found in an ashy dump deposit in the inner ditch of the hillfort and is also notable for evidence postmortem modification. Fragment 11 displays evidence of a cut edge that occurred after the time of death, indicating that the bone was subjected to deliberate working. This carving seems to have been carried out when the bone was relatively fresh. This fragment may have originally been part of a larger worked bone, as two edges are roughly broken and unworked. The modification of human bone is rare in Iron Age Britain, Broxmouth is not the only example of this practice. Examples from Atlantic Scotland include a perforated cranial fragment found at Cnip wheelhouse on the Isle of Lewis, at the complex roundhouse at Killhead in Caithness, and other sites. The fragment from Cnip wheelhouse is dated to the first or second century CE and is most similar to Fragment 11 from Broxmouth.

The disarticulated fragments display evidence for a range of postmortem practices, including the exposure of human remains, deliberate disarticulation of skeletons, and intentional working of human bone. While the overall number of fragments that were discovered was small, inhabitants of Broxmouth would have still been familiar with the practices associated with the treatment and display of human remains. The practices at Broxmouth are also seen in other parts of Iron Age Britain.

The extraordinarily high rate of violent trauma in the disarticulated fragments at Broxmouth reflect a very different set of practices from those seen in the cemetery or isolated graves. The levels of violence and isotropic evidence make it seem unlikely that the fragments were stray bones from exposure burial or evidence of the retention of ancestral relics. Instead, it seems more likely that these individuals were outsiders who died violent deaths as a result of raids, human sacrifice, or execution.
