= Battle of Dunbar (1650) =

English invasion of Scotland

- Part of the Anglo-Scottish war
- Cromwell at Dunbar (1886)
| Date | 3 September 1650 |
| Location | near Broxmouth, Scotland, 2 miles (3.2 km) southeast of Dunbar 55°59′1.5″N 2°29′4″W |
| Result | English victory |

Belligerents
| Scotland | England |

Commanders and leaders
| David Leslie | Oliver Cromwell |

Strength
| 8,000–9,500 infantry; 2,000–3,000 cavalry; 32 guns; Total: 10,000–12,500 | 7,500 infantry; 3,500 cavalry; 22 guns; Total: 11,000 |

Casualties and losses
| 300–500 killed; 1,000 wounded; 6,000 captured; See "Casualties" for further details | 20–40 killed |

Registered battlefield
- Official name: Battle of Dunbar II
- Designated: 21 March 2011
- Reference no.: BTL7

The location of the battle, Dunbar and Edinburgh within south-east Scotland and Berwick in north-east England

The Battle of Dunbar was fought between the English New Model Army, under Oliver Cromwell, and a Scottish army commanded by David Leslie on 3 September 1650 near Dunbar, Scotland. The battle resulted in a decisive victory for the English. It was the first major battle of the 1650 invasion of Scotland.

After Charles I's execution in 1649, the English Rump Parliament established a republican Commonwealth in England. When their erstwhile ally, Scotland, recognised his son Charles II as king of all of Britain on 1 May 1650 and began recruiting an army to support him, the English dispatched the New Model Army, under the command of Cromwell. The army crossed into Scotland on 22 July, with a force of over 16,000 men. The Scots withdrew to Edinburgh, stripping the land of provisions. Cromwell attempted to draw the Scots out into a set piece battle, but they resisted, and Cromwell was unable to break through their defensive line. At the end of August, with his army weakened through disease and lack of food, Cromwell withdrew to the port of Dunbar. The Scottish army followed and took up an unassailable position on Doon Hill, overlooking the town. On 2 September, although many of their most experienced men had been dismissed in religious purges, the Scots advanced towards Dunbar and the English took up positions outside the town.

Before dawn on 3 September the English launched a surprise attack on the Scots, who were poorly prepared. The fighting was restricted to the north-eastern flank with the main contingents of English and Scottish cavalry fighting inconclusively, as did the English and Scottish infantry. Due to the terrain Leslie was unable to reinforce the fighting, while Cromwell used his last reserve to outflank the Scots. The Scottish cavalry broke and routed; the Scottish infantry made a fighting retreat but suffered heavy casualties. Between 300 and 500 Scots were killed, approximately 1,000 wounded and at least 6,000 were taken prisoner from an army of 12,500 or fewer.

After the battle, the Scottish government took refuge in Stirling, where Leslie rallied what remained of his army. The English captured Edinburgh and the strategically important port of Leith. In the summer of 1651 the English crossed the Firth of Forth to land a force in Fife; they defeated the Scots at Inverkeithing and so threatened the northern Scottish strongholds. In response, Leslie and Charles II marched the Scottish army south in an unsuccessful attempt to rally Royalist supporters in England. The Scottish government, left in an untenable situation, surrendered to Cromwell, who then followed the Scots south. At the Battle of Worcester, precisely one year after the Battle of Dunbar, Cromwell crushed the Scottish army, ending the war.

== Background ==
=== First and Second English Civil Wars ===
After years of rising tensions, the relationship between the king of England, Charles I, and his English Parliament broke down in armed conflict in 1642, starting the First English Civil War. Charles was also, but separately, king of Scotland. He had gone to war with his Scottish subjects in the Bishops' Wars in 1639 and 1640. These had arisen from the Scots' refusal to accept Charles's attempts to reform the Scottish Kirk to bring it into line with English religious practices. Charles was not successful in these endeavours and the ensuing settlement established the Covenanters' hold on Scottish government, requiring all civil office-holders, parliamentarians and clerics to sign the National Covenant and giving the Scottish Parliament the authority to approve all of the king's councillors in Scotland.

In England, Charles's supporters, the Royalists, were opposed by the combined forces of the English Parliamentarians and the Scots, who in 1643 had formed an alliance bound by the Solemn League and Covenant, in which the English Parliament agreed to reform the English church along similar lines to the Scottish Kirk in return for the Scots' military assistance. After four years of war the Royalists were defeated. With his capital at Oxford under siege, Charles escaped on 27 April 1646, surrendered to the Scots at Southwell on 5 May and was taken to Newcastle, which was in Scottish hands. The Scots and the English Parliament agreed on a peace settlement which they put before the King. Known as the Newcastle Propositions, it would have required all of the King's subjects in Scotland, England and Ireland to sign the Solemn League and Covenant, brought the church in each kingdom into accordance with the Covenant and with Presbyterianism and ceded much of Charles's secular authority as king of England to the English Parliament. The Scots spent some months trying to persuade Charles to agree to these terms, but he refused to do so. Eventually, under pressure from the English to withdraw their forces now the war was over, the Scots handed Charles over to the English parliamentary forces in exchange for a financial settlement and left England on 3 February 1647.

Charles then engaged in separate negotiations with different factions. Presbyterian English Parliamentarians and the Scots wanted him to accept a modified version of the Newcastle Propositions, but in June, Cornet George Joyce of the New Model Army seized Charles, and the army council pressed him to accept the Heads of Proposals, a less demanding set of terms which, crucially, did not require a Presbyterian reformation of the church. He rejected these as well and instead signed an offer known as the Engagement, which had been thrashed out with the Scottish delegation, on 26 December. Charles agreed to confirm the Solemn League and Covenant by act of Parliament in both kingdoms and to accept Presbyterianism in England, but only for a trial period of three years, in return for the Scots' assistance in regaining his throne in England.

When the delegation returned to Edinburgh with the Engagement, the Scots were bitterly divided on whether to accept its terms. Its supporters, who became known as the Engagers, argued that it offered the best chance the Scots would get of acceptance of the Covenant across the three kingdoms and that rejecting it risked pushing Charles to accept the Heads of Proposals. It was opposed by those who believed that to send an army into England on behalf of the King would be to break the Solemn League and Covenant and that it offered no guarantee of a lasting Presbyterian church in England; the Kirk went so far as to issue a declaration on 5 May 1648 that condemned the Engagement as a breach of God's law. After a protracted political struggle, the Engagers gained a majority in the Scottish Parliament, by which time war had again broken out in England between Royalists and Parliamentarians. The Scots sent an army under the command of the Duke of Hamilton into England to fight on behalf of the King in July, but it was heavily defeated at Preston by a force led by Oliver Cromwell. The rout of the Engager army led to further political upheaval in Scotland and the faction opposed to the Engagement was able to regain control of the government, with the assistance of a group of English Parliamentary cavalry led by Cromwell.

=== Accession of Charles II ===
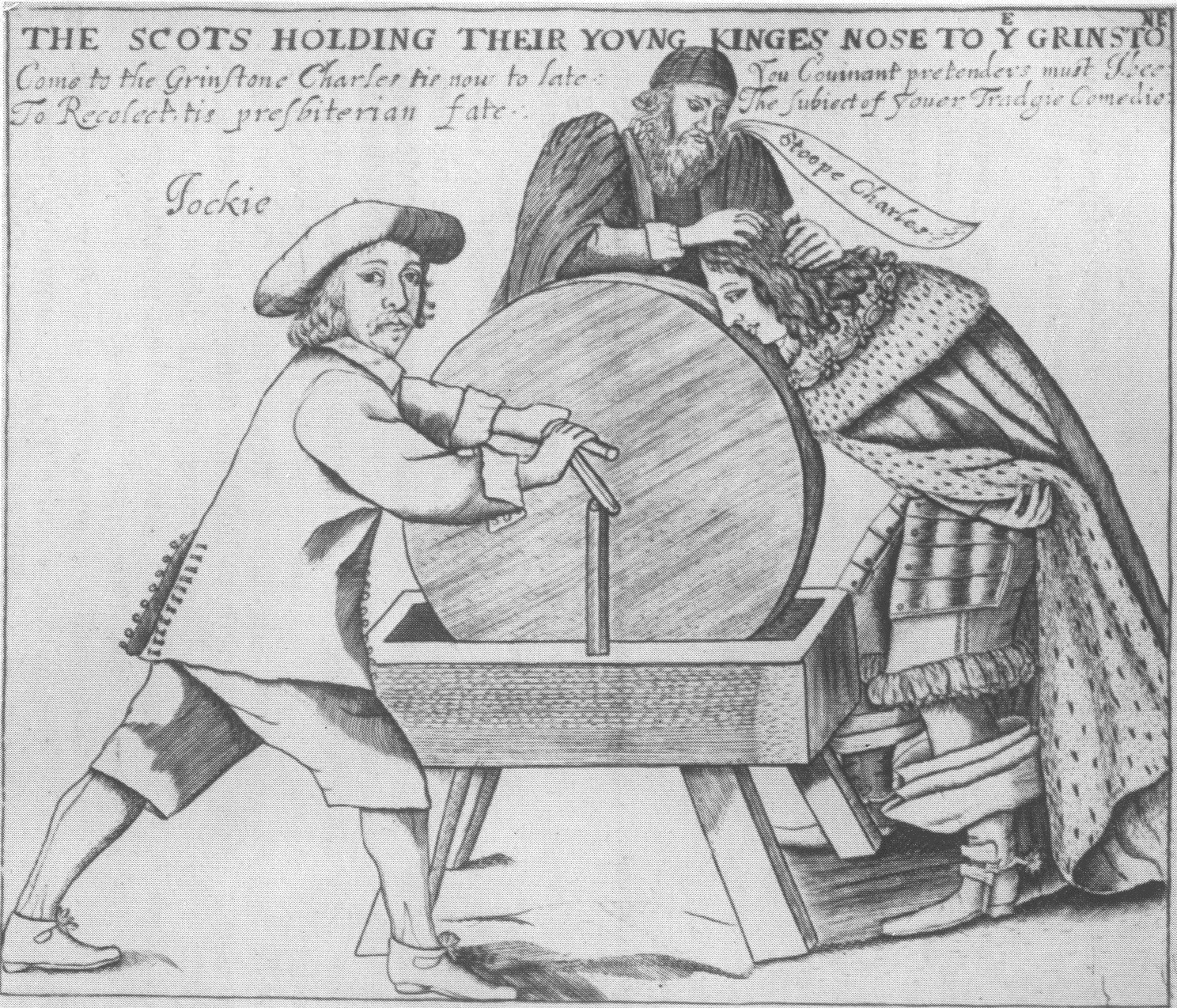
A contemporary English view of the Scots imposing conditions on Charles II in return for their support

Exasperated by the prolonged bloodshed, the New Model Army purged parliament and established the Rump Parliament, which had Charles tried for treason against the English people; he was executed on 30 January 1649, and the republican Commonwealth was created. The Scottish Parliament, which had not been consulted prior to the King's execution, declared his son, also Charles, king of Britain. Before they would permit him to return from exile in the Dutch Republic to take up his crown, they demanded that he first sign both Covenants: recognising the authority of the Kirk in religious matters and that of parliament in civil affairs. Charles II was initially reluctant to accept these conditions, but after Cromwell's campaign in Ireland crushed his Royalist supporters there, he felt compelled to accept the Scottish terms and signed the Treaty of Breda on 1 May 1650. The Scottish Parliament set about rapidly recruiting an army to support the new king and Charles set sail to Scotland, landing on 23 June.

Scotland was actively rearming and the leaders of the English Commonwealth felt threatened. They pressured Thomas Fairfax, lord general of the New Model Army, to launch a preemptive attack. Fairfax accepted the commission to lead the army north to defend against the possibility of a Scottish invasion but was unwilling to strike the first blow against his former allies, believing that England and Scotland were still bound by the Solemn League and Covenant. When a formal order to attack came on 20 June, Fairfax resigned his commission. A parliamentary committee which included Cromwell, his close friend, attempted to dissuade him, pleading with him to change his mind, but Fairfax remained resolute and retired from public life. Cromwell succeeded to his office as lord general, becoming commander-in-chief of the New Model Army; he received his commission on 28 June and set out for Scotland the same day.

== Prelude ==
Oliver Cromwell, commander of the English forces

Once the Treaty of Breda had been signed, the Scottish Parliament started levying men to form a new army, under the command of David Leslie. Their aim was to increase their forces to 36,000 men, but that number was never achieved; by the time Cromwell entered Scotland, crossing the border near Berwick on July 22, Leslie had some 8,000–9,500 infantry and 2,000–3,000 cavalry, although these numbers fluctuated during the course of the campaign. The government instituted a commission to purge the army of anyone suspected of having supported the Engagement, as well as other men considered sinful or undesirable. (Note: The Committee for Purging the Army, established on 21 June.) This was opposed, unsuccessfully, by much of the Scottish nobility and the experienced military leaders, including Leslie. This purge removed many experienced officers and the bulk of the army was composed of raw recruits with little training or experience.

Leslie prepared a defensive line of earthworks between Edinburgh and Leith and employed a scorched earth policy between that line and the invading English army, allowing Cromwell to advance unopposed. Lack of supplies and the hostility of the local people towards the English invaders, forced Cromwell to rely on a seaborne supply chain and he captured the ports of Dunbar and Musselburgh in order to facilitate this. Operations were hampered by persistent bad weather and the adverse conditions and a shortage of food caused much sickness in the English army, substantially reducing its strength.

Cromwell attempted to bring the Scots to battle at Edinburgh. He advanced on Leslie's lines on 29 July, capturing Arthur's Seat and bombarding Leith from Salisbury Crags. Cromwell was not able to draw Leslie out and the English retired for the night to Musselburgh; their rest was disturbed by a party of Scottish cavalry raiding their camp in the early hours. Cromwell's attack coincided with a visit by Charles II to the Scottish army, where he was warmly received. Members of the Covenanter government, concerned that their Godly war would be corrupted by feelings of personal loyalty to the King, asked Charles II to leave. They then ordered a new purge, which was quickly enacted in early August, removing 80 officers and 4,000 of Leslie's men, damaging morale as well as weakening the army's strength.

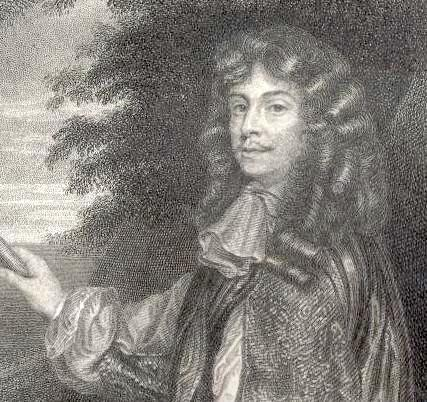
David Leslie, commander of the Scottish forces

Throughout August Cromwell continued to try to draw the Scots out from their defences so as to enable a set piece battle. Leslie resisted, ignoring pressure from the secular and religious Scottish hierarchy to attack Cromwell's weakened army; he reasoned that the persistent bad weather, the difficult English supply situation and the dysentery and fever that had broken out in the English camp would force Cromwell to withdraw back into England before winter set in.

On 31 August Cromwell did withdraw; the English army reached Dunbar on 1 September, having taken two days to march the 17 miles (27 km) from Musselburgh, harassed day and night by the pursuing Scots. The road was left littered with abandoned equipment and the men arrived, according to one of their officers, Captain John Hodgson, as a "poor, shattered, hungry, discouraged army". The Scottish army outflanked the English, blocking the road to Berwick and England at the easily defended Cockburnspath Defile. Their main force encamped on the 177-metre-high (581 ft) Doon Hill, two miles (3.2 km) south of Dunbar, where it overlooked the town and the coastal road running south west from the town. The hill was all but invulnerable to direct assault. The English army had lost its freedom of manoeuvre, although they could supply themselves by sea and, if needs be, evacuate the army the same way. On 2 September Cromwell surveyed the situation and wrote to the governor of Newcastle warning him to prepare for a possible Scottish invasion:

We are here upon an engagement very difficult. The enemy hath blocked up our way at the pass at Copperspath, through which we cannot get without almost a miracle. He lieth so upon the hills that we know not how to come that way without great difficulty; and our lying here daily consumeth our men who fall sick beyond imagination.

== Opposing forces ==
=== Infantry ===
Infantry formations, equipment and tactics were similar in both armies, although the basic formation of the regiment varied greatly in size. An infantry regiment was composed of both musketeers and pikemen. The musketeers were armed with muskets possessing 4-foot-long (1.2 m) barrels and, mostly, matchlock firing mechanisms. These relied on the glowing end of a length of slow match, thin cord soaked in saltpetre, igniting the weapon's priming powder when the trigger was pulled. These were reliable and robust weapons, but their effectiveness was severely reduced in poor weather. In addition, keeping the slow match burning at all times resulted in the consumption of a vast amount, while dowsing it rendered the musket useless. Balancing combat readiness against logistical capability called for fine judgement from a regiment's officers. A small number of musketeers on each side were equipped with the more reliable flintlock muskets, known at the time as firelocks. In 1650 musketeer tactics were in the middle of a transition from firing one rank at a time so as to maintain a steady fire, to the entire unit discharging a volley simultaneously for shock effect.

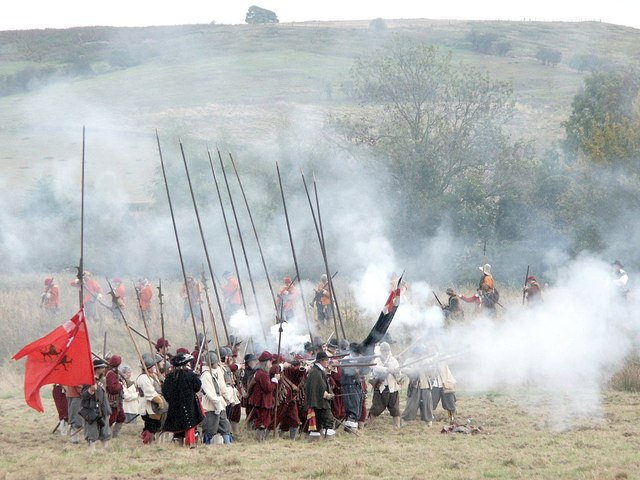
Civil War reenactors

Pikemen were equipped with pikes: long wooden shafts tipped with steel points. Pikes as issued in both armies were 18 feet (5.5 m) long, but on the march they were commonly cut down to a more wieldy 15 feet (4.6 m) or so. The pikemen carried basic swords and typically wore steel helmets but no other armour. Military manuals of the time suggested a ratio of two musketeers for each pikeman, but in practice commanders usually attempted to maximise the number of musketeers and a higher ratio was the rule. (Note: The Parliamentarian New Model Army was formed in 1645 with three musketeers for each pikeman. By 1650 some Royalist regiments had dispensed with pikemen altogether, although this was not the case with any of those at Dunbar.)

Both armies organised their infantry regiments into brigades of three regiments each, which were typically deployed with two regiments abreast and the third behind as a reserve. Sometimes the two forward regiments of a brigade would amalgamate into a single larger battalia. The men in each unit would form up four or five ranks deep and in a relatively loose formation, with about 1 metre (3 ft 3.4 in) of frontage per file; so an infantry regiment of 600 might form up 120 men wide and 5 deep, giving it a frontage of 120 metres (390 ft) and a depth of 5 metres (16 ft). The pikemen would be placed in the centre of a formation, in a "stand", with the musketeers divided on each side. The usual tactic against infantry was for the musketeers to fire on their opponents and once it was thought that they had been sufficiently weakened or demoralised the stand of pikemen would advance, attempting to break through the enemy centre. This was known as a "push of pike". The musketeers would also advance, engaging the enemy with their musket butts, (Note: Bayonets were not used by British infantry until the 1660s.) which were steel-plated for this purpose and attempting to envelop the opposing formation.

Against cavalry, doctrine called for infantry units to tighten the spacing between their files to approximately 45 centimetres (18 in) per man and to advance steadily. To be effective against infantry, cavalry needed to break into their formation and if the men were packed together this was not possible. It was accepted that so long as the morale of the infantry held, cavalry could do little against the front of such a formation. However, the flanks and rear were increasingly vulnerable as the infantry packed more closely together, as this made manoeuvring or turning the unit more difficult.

=== Cavalry ===
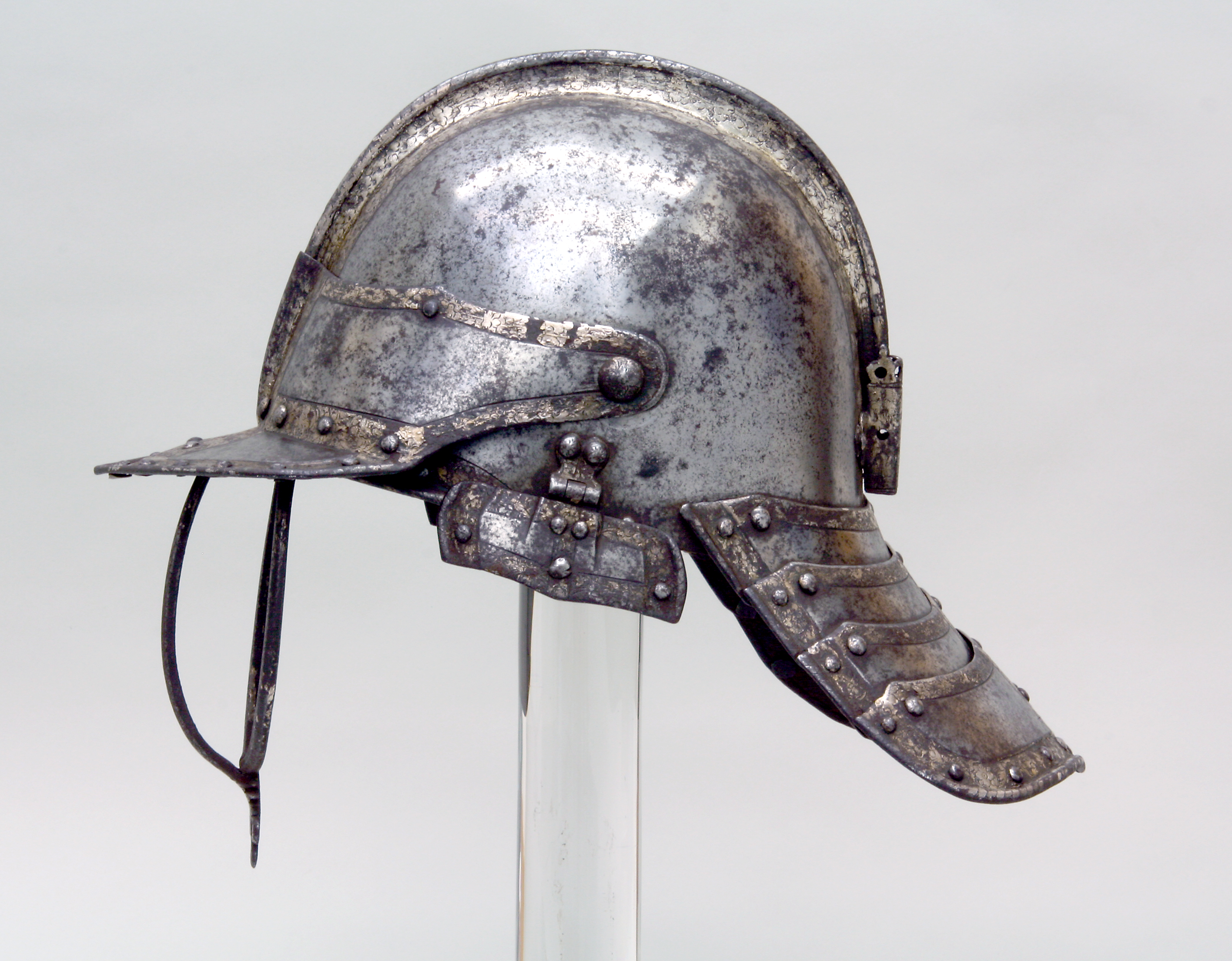
An English lobster-tailed pot helmet c. 1630–1640, with neck protection (the "lobster tail"), three-barred face protection, a peak and a longitudinal comb on the skull; the hinged cheekpieces are missing

Most of the English cavalry were mounted on large, for the time, horses. The cavalrymen wore metal lobster-tailed pot helmets which protected the head and, usually, the neck, cheeks and, to an extent, face. They wore jackets of thick uncured leather and thigh-length boots. Body armour – a cuirass (metal chest and back plates) – was unusual but not unknown. They were each armed with two pistols and a sword. The pistols were 18 inches (46 cm) to 24 inches (61 cm) long and had a very limited effective range. Most but not all cavalry pistols had flintlock firing mechanisms, which were more reliable in damp or windy weather than matchlock mechanisms. Flintlock mechanisms were more expensive than matchlock ones and were usually reserved for the cavalry, who found igniting and using the slow match while controlling a horse inconvenient. The swords were straight, 3-foot-long (90 cm) and effective at both cutting and thrusting. Cavalry were usually positioned on each flank of the infantry.

The Scottish cavalry were similarly equipped, with helmets, pistols, swords and no body armour, although their front ranks bore lances rather than pistols. The main difference was that the Scottish horses were smaller and lighter; this gave them greater manoeuvrability but put them at a disadvantage in a face-to-face confrontation. English cavalry tactics were intended to utilise their strengths. They would advance in a tight formation, with their riders' legs interlocked, at no faster than a trot – in order to maintain formation. They would discharge their pistols at very short range and upon coming into contact attempt to use the sheer weight of their mounts and the mass of their formation to force back their opponents and burst through their ranks.

Both armies contained a number of dragoons. These had originated as mounted infantry, using horses to increase their operational mobility and dismounting to fight with pikes or muskets. By 1650 they had largely become specialist mounted troops; none carried pikes. The English dragoons had exchanged their muskets for carbines (shorter-barrelled versions of the infantry's muskets) or, occasionally, pistols and been formally recognised as a cavalry arm. Scottish dragoons were partway through this transformation and carried both matchlock muskets and cavalry swords. Dragoons usually acted as scouts, or formed their army's rearguard.

=== Artillery ===
The English army possessed about a dozen heavy guns used for sieges which played no part in the battle. The field artillery of both armies, of a variety of calibres from 3 to 20 pounds (1.4 to 9 kg), was immobile once positioned – where wheeled carriages were provided the wheels were removed before firing. Usually, the guns were allocated two or three to each regiment, to provide direct support, but for this battle, Cromwell massed all of his field artillery in one group. The Scottish artillery was even less mobile than the English and most of it played no part due to the way the battle developed, but a few of the lighter Scottish pieces, attached to individual regiments, saw action. Each gun was served by three crew, although there were a large number of additional auxiliary and supernumerary men in the artillery trains.

=== Numbers ===
All of the Scottish units were well under their notional complements. There were 22 Scottish infantry regiments present, each with an establishment of about 750 men, but many had been amalgamated due to their low strengths. Only 15 composite formations took part in the battle. They averaged fewer than 700 men each for a total of approximately 9,500 according to Stuart Reid, or 8,000–9,000 according to Richard Brooks. The Scots fielded 19 small cavalry regiments, with a notional aggregate strength of 4,500; in fact they probably totalled fewer than 3,000.

The New Model Army mustered on 22 July 1650, immediately prior to crossing into Scotland. The 8 infantry regiments, notionally of 1,200 men each, totalled 10,249. Their 7 cavalry regiments and several ancillary mounted units were slightly above their complement of 5,400. (Note: The muster recorded 5,415 cavalry.) The artillery component numbered 640, giving the English a total of 16,289 fighting men at this point. By the day of the battle this total had been seriously depleted. The English navy had taken off some 2,000 sick men and an unknown number had died. A proportion of the remainder were ill: Reid gives the total of English lost through sickness since the start of the campaign as 4,000–5,000 and reckons that there were "upwards of 1,000 sick still with the army". All of those who could would have joined their regiments for the battle. Cromwell states that "as to sound men [...] about 7,500 foot and 3,500 horse", while the modern historian Trevor Royle estimates that a little over 12,000 were fit for action; Reid gives 12,080.

In addition both sides fielded a number of artillery pieces, but details of the number and calibres have not survived other than that the English had 22 field and siege guns with only the field guns taking part in the battle; and the Scots a total of 32 with most not firing during the action.

== Battle ==
=== Preparation ===
The position of the Scottish army on Doon Hill was tactically sound but would cause logistical problems. So far in the campaign the Scots had experienced difficulty in feeding their army and the small, muddy tracks from Edinburgh could not provide the army with food and slow match for more than a few days. More immediately, the weather was foul and Doon Hill was fully exposed to it. The Scottish position was not sustainable and on 2 September they held a council of war to debate what to do. There is no record of the discussion, nor certainty as to the attendees and survivors gave differing accounts. A number of clerics, plus the government's leading lawyer, Archibald Johnston of Wariston, were present and they were enthusiastic for pressing the English hard. Royle, among others, has pointed out that the idea that Leslie was pressured into leaving the security of Doon Hill due to amateur advice from the Covenanter clerics is a myth. Leslie's experienced military lieutenants were unanimous that the Scots had the English at a disadvantage and that they should advance against them.

On 2 September the Scots moved off the exposed ridge of Doon Hill. This took most of the day. The English army in turn advanced out of Dunbar and took up defensive positions along the steep north bank of the Brox Burn stream, which roughly paralleled the Doon Hill ridge. From Brand's Mill westward this burn formed a significant obstacle against attack for both sides. Both Leslie and Cromwell concentrated their cavalry on the seaward side of Brand's Mill, where the Brox Burn was more readily traversable. Leslie deployed much of his light artillery with his cavalry and attempted to also move his infantry to the east. The rough ground and the limited room to manoeuvre between the Brox Burn and the steep northern slope of Doon Hill hampered this and it was incomplete when halted by nightfall.

Cromwell intended to launch a dawn assault against the Scots on 3 September, but the objective of the attack has been debated by historians. After the event Cromwell claimed that the Scots moving down off Doon Hill had presented him with the long-sought opportunity for an open battle which he was quick to seize. (Note: Hodgson states that he heard Cromwell exclaim "God is delivering them into our hands" when he saw the Scots descending from the hill.) The historians Reid and Malcolm Wanklyn believe that Cromwell was attempting to break out and escape along the coast road to England. Reid cites the movement of the baggage train from Dunbar churchyard to Broxmouth House as one indication. This position, in the front line of the army, was, says Reid, "a most extraordinary place" for the baggage train, only explicable by its nearness to the road which would have enabled it to move off promptly if the way could be opened. The alternative view is that Cromwell always planned an all-out assault and a decisive battle; Peter Reese is a proponent, although he states that "the odds against the English ... were awesome".

In the adverse weather conditions it took the English army all night to reposition in preparation for the planned pre-dawn assault. At about 10:00 pm on 2 September English dragoons probed the Scottish positions. The whole Scottish army stood-to and the English withdrew slightly, maintaining patrols to try to ensure that the Scots were unaware of the manoeuvres going on behind them. The Scottish soldier John Nicholl described "a drakie nycht full of wind and weit" (a dark night full of wind and wet) and many Scottish soldiers attempted to shelter in the corn stooks. Their officers scattered across the countryside in search of sounder shelter, their cavalry went foraging and unsaddled most of their horses and Major General James Holborne ordered that the musketeers should extinguish their slow match except for two men per company. (Note: Holborne was the only senior Scottish officer to visit the front line that night, prior to the battle starting.)

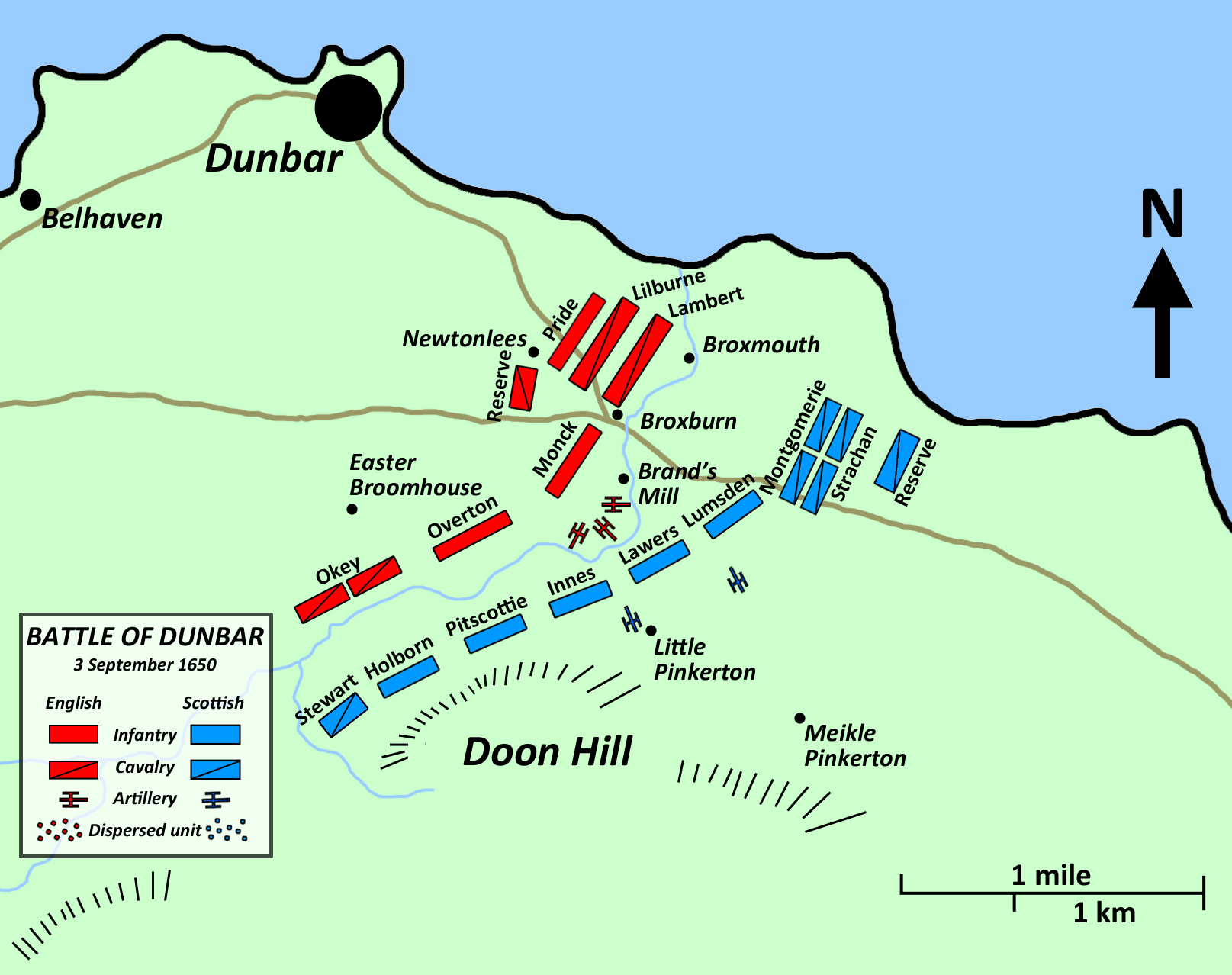
Dispositions shortly before the start of the battle, at about 4:30 am

By around 4:00 am the English troops had reached positions approximately where Cromwell intended them to be; none of them had made the mistake in the dark of going too far and alerting the Scots to their manoeuvres. John Lambert's brigade of three cavalry regiments was positioned abreast of the road; Robert Lilburne's brigade of a further three cavalry regiments was positioned behind it. Thomas Pride's infantry brigade of three infantry regiments was to the north west of the cavalry, ready to cross the Brox Burn further downstream at Broxmouth. George Monck, with a slightly smaller force than Pride, was south of the cavalry, in position to cross the Brox Burn upstream of the road ford at Brand's Mill. Behind all of these, held in reserve, was Cromwell's own Lord General's Regiment, reinforced by two companies of dragoons. A little upstream of Brand's Mill the English field artillery had set up on a prominent spur where it had a good field of fire into the centre of the Scottish army. To the south west of this concentration Robert Overton's three infantry regiments faced the three infantry brigades of the Scottish centre and left. Four companies of dragoons were dispersed in strong pickets along the north bank of the Brox Burn in front of Overton's brigade and extending to its right (west).

The Scots were in a conventional line abreast with nearly all of their cavalry concentrated on their right (east) flank. On the extreme left was a force of about 500 cavalry commanded by William Stewart. Next was the Scottish infantry organised in five brigades. These were, from their left (west): 2,000 men under James Holborne; 1,600 men under Colin Pitscottie; John Innes' brigade of 1,200–1,500; about 2,000 men commanded by James Lumsden; and, facing Brand's Mill, James Campbell of Lawers' 2,000 men. Astride the road and stretching north across the coastal plain were two strong forces of cavalry, totalling approximately 2,500 men, one behind the other. The leading (western) formation was commanded by Robert Montgomerie and the second line by Archibald Strachan. The camp of a small force of dragoons under John Douglas was to the rear of the cavalry, but it is not clear to what extent these troops had been disposed forward as pickets on the night of the battle.

=== Night attack ===
==== Initial assault ====
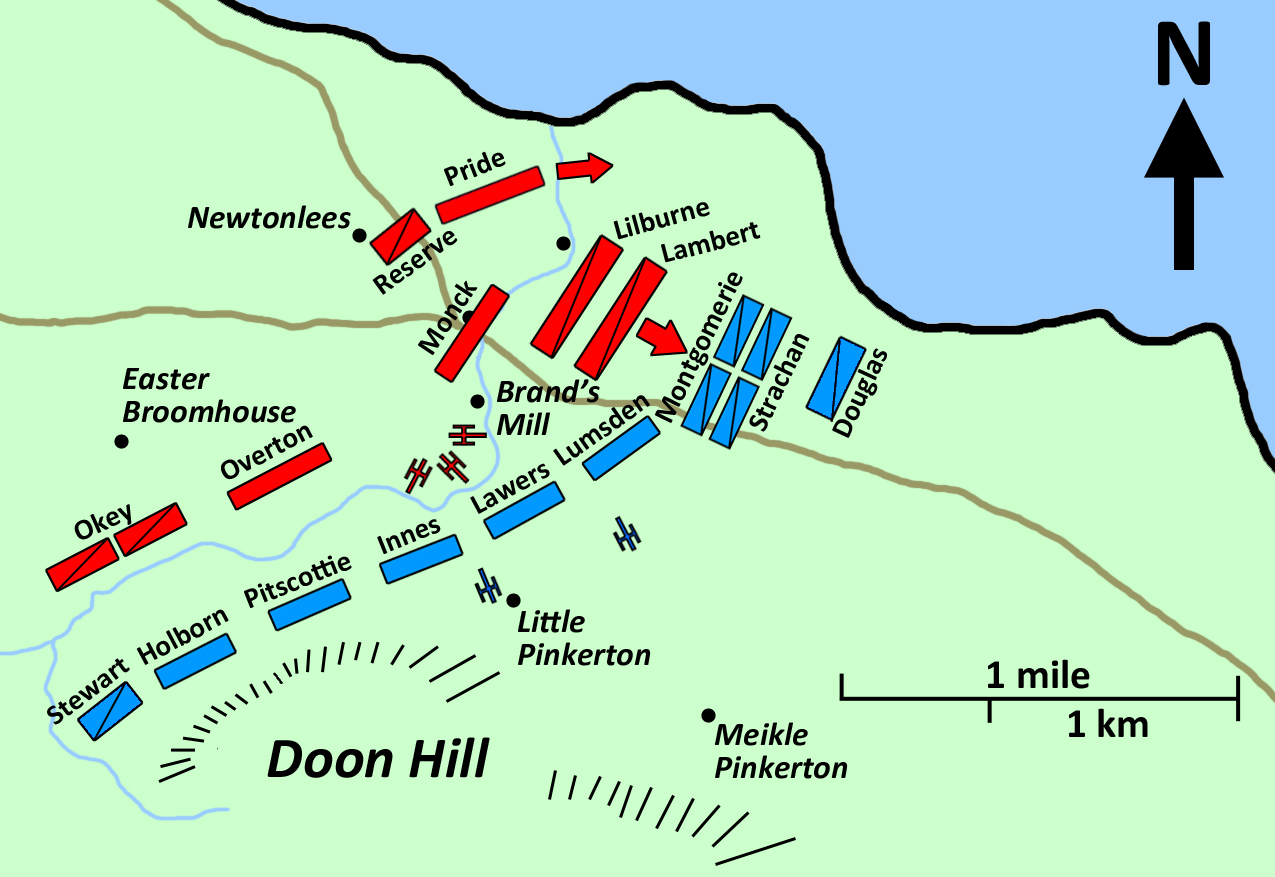
The initial movements of the English army

At approximately 4:00 am on 3 September English cavalry advanced to clear the Scottish pickets from the three militarily practicable crossing points of the Brox Burn: Brand's Mill, the road ford and north of Broxmouth House. The pickets were driven back and a confused firefight broke out. The rain ceased and the cloud briefly cleared allowing moonlight to illuminate the scene. The artillery of both sides opened fire, although it is not known to what effect. At the first hint of dawn, just after 5:00 am with sunrise at 5:33 am, Lambert's cavalry brigade crossed the Brox Burn at the road ford and formed up on the other side unmolested. The English mounts were in good condition and the three regiments advanced in their usual tight formation. Despite the activity during the night, the forward formation of Scottish cavalry was not prepared for action and its commander, Montgomerie, was probably not present. The Scots were taken by surprise, some were still in their tents and they were scattered by the English.

At around the same time Monck pushed his infantry brigade across the Brox Burn at Brand's Mill and attacked Lumsden's brigade of Scottish infantry. Despite having been engaged when the Brand's Ford pickets were driven in shortly before, Lumsden's men were in disarray. Reese reports that many of them were new recruits who had only recently joined the brigade. Reid suggests the inexperienced musketeers may have used all of their ammunition during the earlier firefight. Monck's musketeers delivered two volleys, receiving little fire in return and charged home alongside their pikemen. The fire of the English field guns enfiladed the Scottish line. There are conflicting and sometimes confused accounts of what happened next. Reid has the Scottish brigade shattering after an ineffectual struggle; Monck's troops pursued but were then caught by a counterattack from the next Scottish brigade in line – Lawers' – driven back and "completely knocked out of the fight". According to Reese, Lumsden's regiments maintained their cohesion and, reinforced by troops from Lawers' Brigade, drove Monck back by weight of numbers. Brooks agrees with Reid that Monck's men were "overpowered".

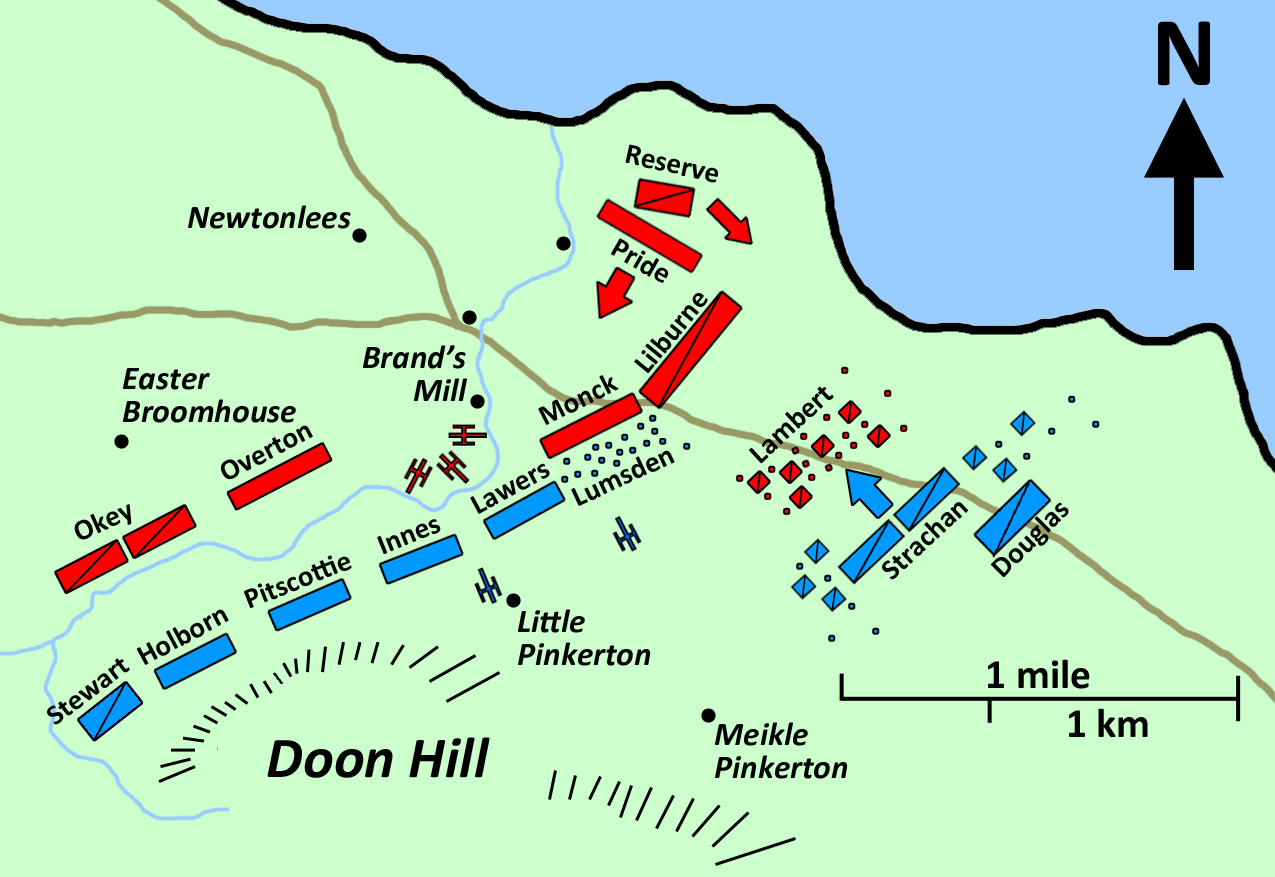
The battle develops.

Meanwhile, Lambert's cavalry charge came to a halt among the tents of the Scottish cavalrymen, with its formation disordered after pursuing the broken Scottish first line cavalry. As they were regrouping they were charged by Strachan's second line cavalry and forced back. Reese points out that it was near dawn, cloudy, misty, there were occasional heavy showers and that great clouds of smoke from cannon and musket fire were drifting across the battlefield: the cumulative effect would have been to greatly restrict visibility and situation awareness. Simultaneously, Lilburne's brigade of a further three cavalry regiments had crossed the Brox Burn, formed up and moved to reinforce Lambert. The fighting seems to have broken down into a series of actions scattered across the coastal plain, with the focus slowly moving to the east.

Pride's Brigade of three English infantry regiments crossed the Brox Burn north of Broxmouth, wheeled right and marched south, behind the ongoing cavalry melee and reinforced Monck's Brigade which was being forced back by the Scottish infantry of Lawers' Brigade and, possibly, Lumsden's. In the confusion Pride's regiments came into action piecemeal and the leftmost (Lambert's) only engaged stragglers in the vicinity of Little Pinkerton. Leslie had three uncommitted infantry brigades, but they were squeezed between the steep slope of Doon Hill and the Brox Burn and were unable to engage. Cromwell had only his reserve cavalry, the reinforced Lord General's Regiment, in hand. The extent to which either commander was aware of the situation on the field is uncertain. According to Hodgson "horse and foot were engaged all over the field". The battle hung in the balance.

==== Outflanking manoeuvre ====
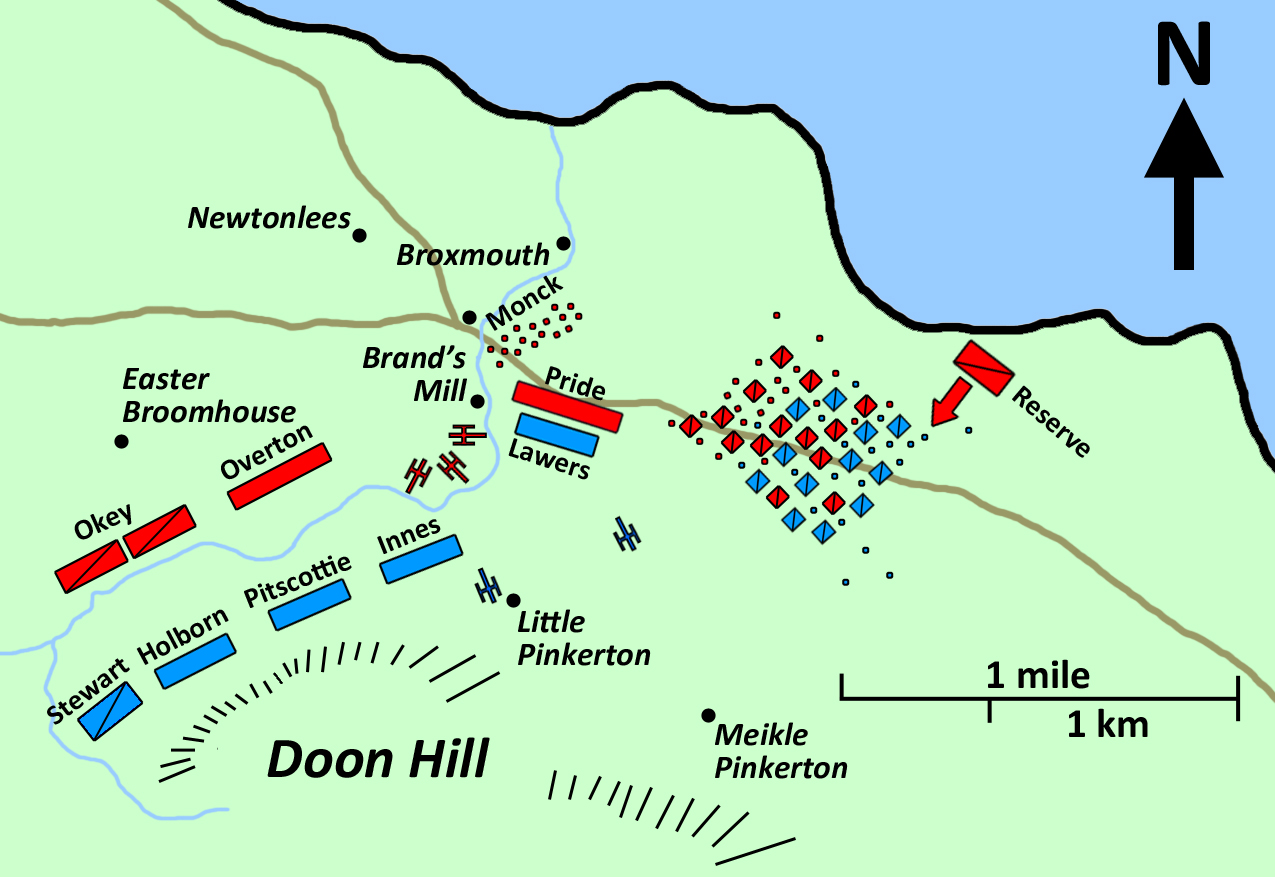
The Scottish cavalry are attacked in the flank.

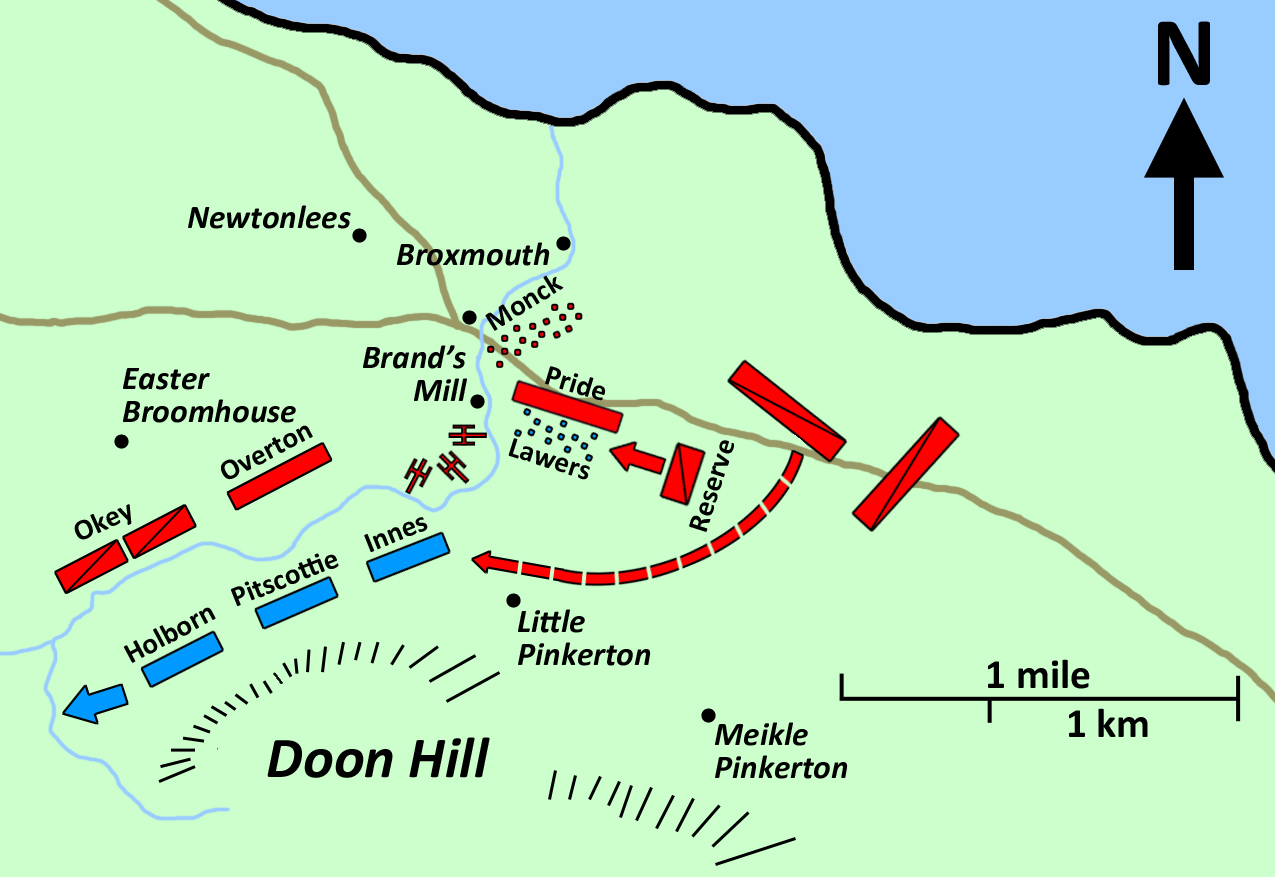
The English roll up the Scottish infantry to win the battle before breakfast.

As with other aspects of the battle, the sources differ regarding what happened next. Reid and Royle separately write that the Lord General's Regiment, led by William Packer, crossed the Brox Burn north of Broxmouth, either alongside or behind Pride's Brigade. It then marched south east, got between the sprawling cavalry battle and the coast, on the Scots' right flank, charged them and set the whole Scottish cavalry force to flight. Wanklyn agrees with this general point but states that it was Pride's infantry brigade that led the flank charge. Cromwell and Lambert prevented a pursuit and surveyed the situation while the English cavalry reorganised. At this point the cavalry troopers sang "Psalm 117". Cromwell ordered his cavalry to the north west, where the infantry struggle was taking place and a unit charged Lawers' troops in their right flank and their formation collapsed. Hodgson wrote that Lawers' Brigade "would not yield though at push of pike and butt-end of musket until a troop of horse charged from one end [flank] to another of them".

In contrast, Reese's account has the Lord General's Regiment, under Cromwell's personal control, following Pride's Brigade across the rear of the cavalry battle and deploying to its left (south). From there Cromwell personally directed them into the exposed flank of Lawers' Brigade at about 7:00 am with the same effect noted above. Meanwhile, the English cavalry gradually got the better of their Scottish counterparts, who broke and scattered. The English cavalry rallied and moved in the general direction of Little Pinkerton.

According to English accounts, Scottish resistance collapsed at this point, with the unengaged Scottish brigades throwing down their weapons and fleeing. Reid points out that as many of the Scottish regiments concerned were fighting again as coherent forces not long after the battle, their withdrawal may have been less panic-stricken than the English recounted. He suggests that Leslie may have been moving the left and centre of his army off the field before Lawers' resistance collapsed. Holborne's and Innes' Brigades crossed the Brox Burn near what is now Doon Bridge (the bridge did not exist at the time) and withdrew to the east in good order, shielded by Stewart's small brigade of cavalry. Pitscottie's Brigade covered their retreat and while two of its regiments escaped with few losses, one – Wedderburn's – was all but wiped out; presumably while gaining the time needed for the other surviving Scots to escape. The Scottish cavalry holding Cockburnspath Defile withdrew and joined the defeated Scottish cavalry from their right wing. They rode a wide loop south and then west of Doon Hill and rejoined Leslie's main force as it withdrew towards their forward base at Haddington, 8 miles (13 km) to the west of the battlefield.

== Aftermath ==
=== Casualties ===
Sources differ as to Scottish casualties. Cromwell gives figures in his contemporaneous correspondence for the strength of the Scottish army based on all of its units being at full strength and claims to have "killed near four thousand" and captured 10,000 Scots. In Cromwell's letters he states that the day after the battle he released between 4,000 and 5,000 of the prisoners. Several modern secondary sources accept these figures; although others dismiss them, with Reid describing them as absurd. The Scottish annalist James Balfour recorded "8 or 900 killed". The English Royalist Edward Walker has 6,000 prisoners being taken and 1,000 of them being released. From Walker's account Reid calculates that fewer than 300 Scots were killed. Brooks uses the known number of Scots wounded, approximately 1,000, to estimate their dead at 300–500. All accounts agree that approximately 5,000 Scottish prisoners were marched south and that 4,000–5,000 Scots survived to retreat towards Edinburgh; over half of them formed bodies of infantry and the balance cavalry or stragglers. English casualties were low, with Cromwell variously giving them as "not twenty men" or 30–40 killed.

The prisoners were taken to England and 3,000 were imprisoned at Durham Cathedral; many died on the march south, or in captivity. In September 2015 archaeologists announced that skeletons found in mass graves near Durham Cathedral were the remains of Scottish soldiers taken prisoner after the battle. The archaeological evidence appeared to show that the bodies had been tipped into a mass grave with no signs of ceremony. At least some of those who survived were deported to become indentured workers on English possessions overseas, or used as forced labour on drainage projects in the Fens.

=== Scottish response ===
When the Scottish government learned of the defeat many people fled Edinburgh in panic, but Leslie sought to rally what remained of his army and build a new defensive line at Stirling, where he was joined by the bulk of the government, clergy and Edinburgh's mercantile elite. Cromwell dispatched Lambert to capture Edinburgh, while he marched on the port of Leith, which offered much better facilities for landing supplies and reinforcements than Dunbar. Without Leslie's army to defend them, both were captured with little difficulty. Cromwell took pains to persuade the citizens that his war was not with them; he promised that their property would be respected and allowed them to come and go freely, hold markets and observe their usual religious services, although the latter was restricted as most of the clergy had removed to Stirling. He also took steps to secure food for the city, which by this point was short on supplies. Edinburgh Castle held out until December, but since it was cut off from reinforcement and supplies and offered no threat, Cromwell did not assault it and treated its commander with courtesy. The historian Austin Woolrych described the behaviour of the occupying troops as "exemplary" and observed that after a short time many fugitives returned to the city and its economic life returned to something akin to normality.

The defeat at Dunbar caused great damage to Leslie's reputation and authority. He attempted to resign as head of the army, but the Scottish government would not permit it, largely because of a lack of any plausible replacement. Several of his officers, however, refused to take orders from him, left Leslie's forces and joined a new army that was being raised by the Western Association.

Divisions already present in the Scottish government were widened by the new situation. The more practical faction believed that the purges were to blame for Leslie's defeat and looked to bring the Engagers back into the fold; the more dogmatic thought that God had deserted them because the purges had not gone far enough and argued that too much faith had been put in Charles II who was not sufficiently committed to the cause of the Covenant. These more radical elements issued the divisive Western Remonstrance, which castigated the government for its failure to properly purge the army and further widened the rifts amongst the Scots. The Remonstrants, as this group became known, took command of the Western Association army and attempted to negotiate with Cromwell, urging him to depart Scotland and leave them in control; Cromwell rejected their advances and destroyed their army at the Battle of Hieton (near the centre of modern Hamilton) on 1 December.

During December Charles and the Scottish government started to draw together what remained of Leslie's forces, as well as the Engagers who had been purged from it and Highland chiefs who had been excluded by their refusal to sign the Covenant. These competing factions were poorly coordinated and even when Cromwell fell ill in early 1651 and was unable to take to the field, they were unable to take effective action. It was not until the late spring of that year that the Scots were able to piece their army together.

=== English conquest ===
A breakthrough was made when English forces, commanded by Lambert, managed to land in Fife and, on 20 July, capture Inverkeithing. This allowed the English army to threaten both Stirling and Perth, while Leslie's men, faced with impending total defeat, started to desert in great numbers. Confident that he would be able to defeat what remained of the Scottish forces, Cromwell, by now returned to health, deliberately left the path from Stirling to England undefended. Charles II and Leslie, presented with little other option if they were not to surrender, went south on 31 July in a desperate bid to raise Royalist support in England. By this time they had only around 12,000 men, who were very short of firearms. They attempted to muster what Royalist support they could on their march through England, but little was forthcoming.

With Leslie and the army gone, Scotland was exposed to the English forces: the Scottish government, now in Perth, surrendered to Cromwell two days after Charles and Leslie left Stirling. Cromwell and Lambert then went south, to shadow the Scottish army, leaving Monck to mop up what little resistance remained. By the end of August, Monck had captured Stirling, Alyth and St Andrews. Dundee, the last significant Scottish stronghold, fell on 1 September.

Cromwell and his forces overtook the Scottish army at Worcester and on 3 September 1651 utterly defeated them. Leslie, along with most of the Royalist commanders, was captured; he was imprisoned in the Tower of London and would remain there until the 1660 Restoration. Charles II himself managed to escape the field. The historian Barry Coward wrote "It was a divided enemy that Cromwell fought after Dunbar and decisively defeated at Worcester, exactly a year after Dunbar." The Scottish Covenanter government was abolished and the English commanders imposed military rule.

== Dunbar medal ==
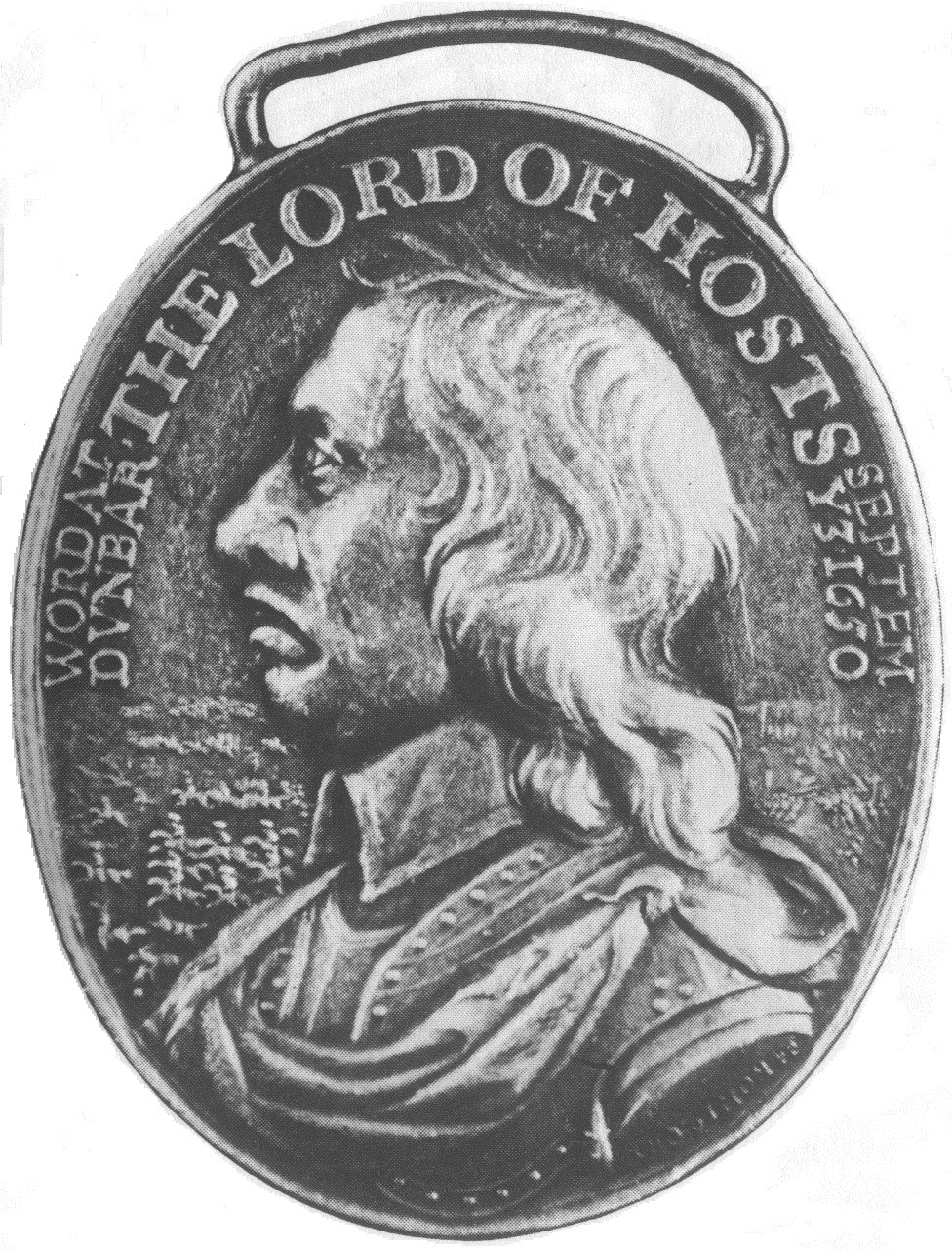
The Dunbar Medal, issued to members of the English army after the battle

Parliament struck the Dunbar Medal for the combatants, in gold for officers and silver for men. It has been claimed to be the first campaign medal to be granted to all ranks of an army and was worn by a cord or chain around the neck. Thomas Simon was dispatched to Edinburgh to create the Lord General's likeness. The medal shows a profile head of Cromwell and the army's battle cry on the day, "The Lord of Hosts" and on the other face a view of Parliament.

== Battlefield today ==
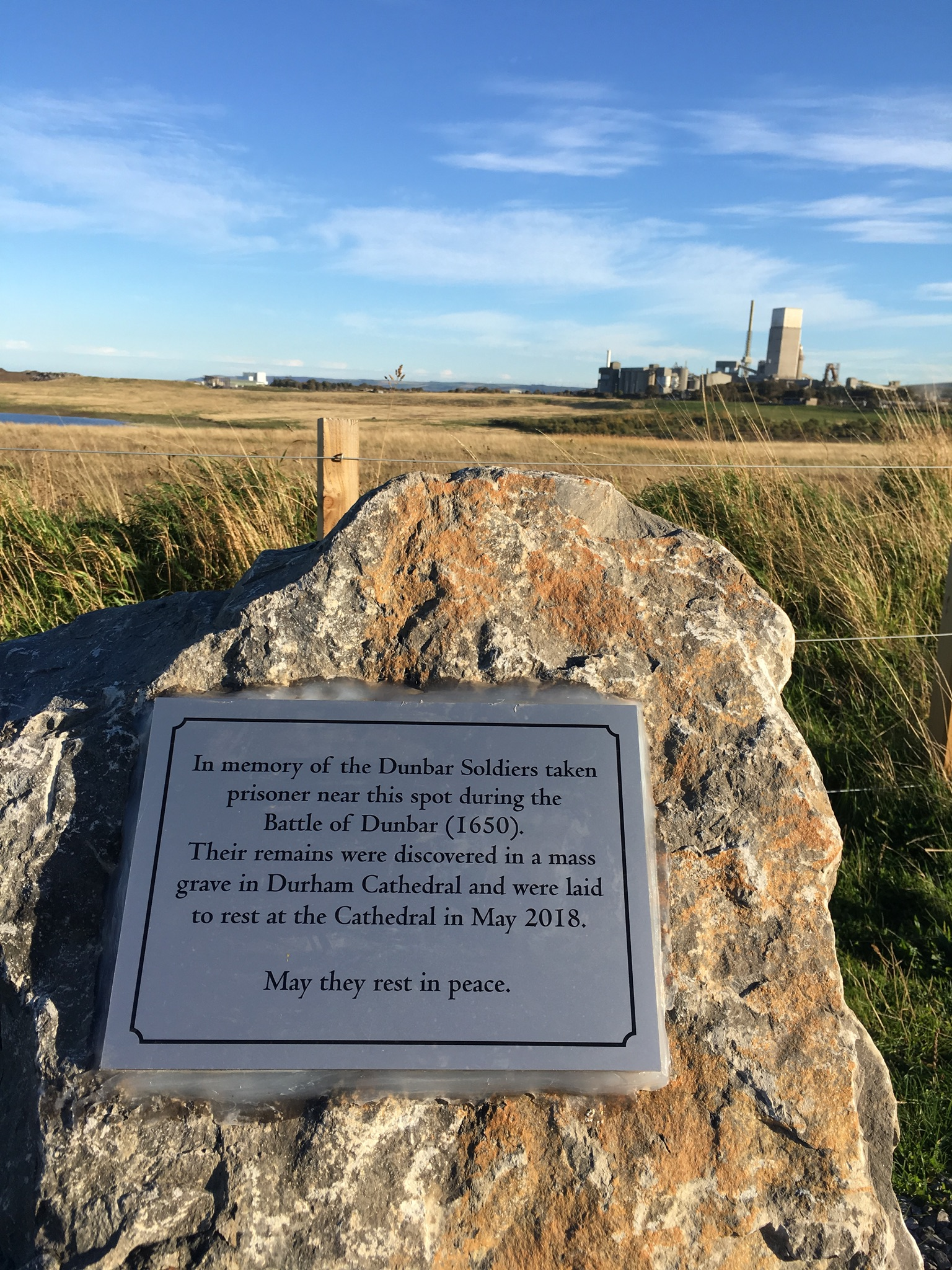
A plaque at the battlefield commemorating the Scottish soldiers taken prisoner and marched to Durham

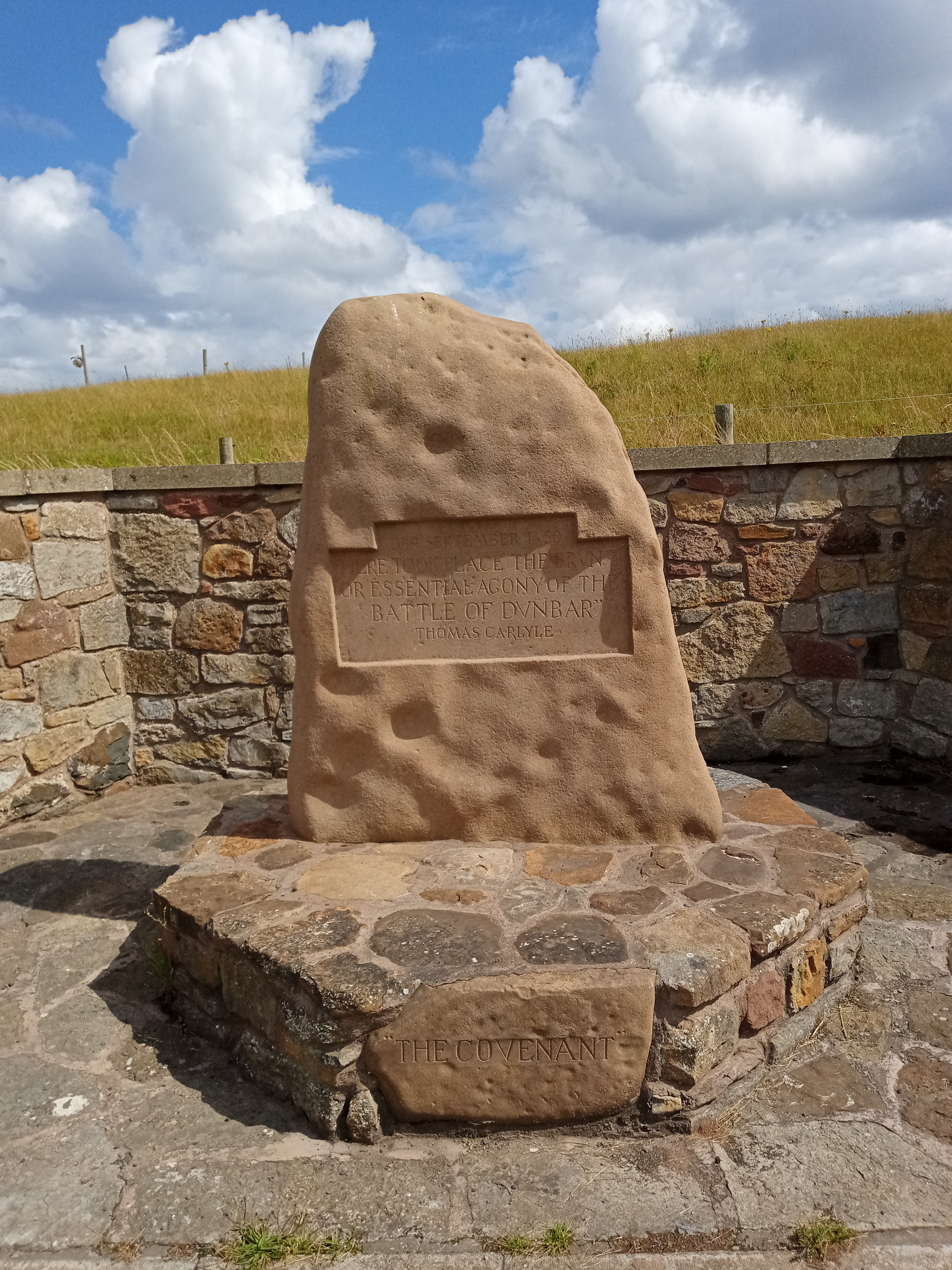
A monument at the site of the battle, inscribed with words by Thomas Carlyle

The battle has traditionally been known as the Battle of Dunbar after the closest parish to the area where the fighting took place, but at least one contemporary source refers to it as the Battle of Broxmouth, after another nearby settlement. The locations which saw action have been designated by Historic Environment Scotland in its Inventory of Historic Battlefields as a battlefield of national importance. The areas covered by the designation include: the summit and slopes of Doon Hill, where the Scots were initially deployed; Broxmouth House and its grounds and the southern part of Dunbar, where the English forces were encamped; the Brox Burn and lands around it, as the general location of the main battle; and Meikle Pinkerton Farm and the lands around it, where the Scottish right flank was deployed. Quarrying in the eastern part of the battlefield, which started in the early 19th century and continues today, has destroyed much of the landscape that was present in 1650 and further damage has been done by the construction of the Main Line railway and the A1 road, but a significant portion of the original landscape survives intact within the grounds of Broxburn House. The location of the English camp has probably been lost beneath the urban development of Dunbar. No artefacts from the battle are known to have been discovered, but Historic Environment Scotland considers it likely that shot and graves may be discovered there by future investigations; the only grave associated with the battle known to exist at the site is that of Sir William Douglas in the grounds of Broxmouth House.

== Notes, citations and sources ==
=== Sources ===
- "Battle of Dunbar II". Historic Environment Scotland. 14 December 2012. Archived from the original on 28 May 2017.
- Brooks, Richard (2005). Cassell's Battlefields of Britain and Ireland. London: Weidenfeld & Nicolson. ISBN 978-0-304-36333-9.
- Butler, James Davie (October 1896). "British Convicts Shipped to American Colonies". American Historical Review. 2 (1): 12–33. doi:10.2307/1833611. JSTOR 1833611. Archived from the original on 4 February 2021.
- Coward, Barry (2003). The Stuart Age: England 1603–1714. Harlow: Pearson Education Ltd. ISBN 978-0-582-77251-9.
- Darby, Henry Clifford (1956) [1940]. The Draining of the Fens. London: New York: Cambridge University Press. OCLC 1148915143.
- Dow, F.D. (1979). Cromwellian Scotland 1651–1660. Edinburgh: John Donald Publishers. ISBN 978-0-85976-049-2.
- "Durham Cathedral History". The Chapter of Durham. Archived from the original on 21 December 2008.
- "Durham Palace Green remains were Scottish prisoners". BBC News. BBC. 2 September 2015. Archived from the original on 4 July 2020.
- Edwards, Peter (2002). "Logistics and Supply". In John Kenyon & Jane Ohlmeyer (eds.). The Civil Wars: A Military History of England, Scotland and Ireland 1638–1660. Oxford: Oxford University Press. pp. 234–271. ISBN 978-0-19-280278-1.
- Ffoulkes, Charles John & Hopkinson, Edward Campbell (2013) [1938]. Sword, Lance & Bayonet: a Record of the Arms of the British Army & Navy. Cambridge: Cambridge University Press. ISBN 978-1-107-67015-0.
- Furgol, Edward (2002). "The Civil Wars in Scotland". In John Kenyon & Jane Ohlmeyer (eds.). The Civil Wars: A Military History of England, Scotland and Ireland 1638–1660. Oxford: Oxford University Press. pp. 41–72. ISBN 978-0-19-280278-1.
- Gentles, Ian (2002). "The Civil Wars in England". In John Kenyon & Jane Ohlmeyer (eds.). The Civil Wars: A Military History of England, Scotland and Ireland 1638–1660. Oxford: Oxford University Press. pp. 103–154. ISBN 978-0-19-280278-1.
- Hutton, Ronald & Reeves, Wiley (2002). "Sieges and Fortifications". In John Kenyon & Jane Ohlmeyer (eds.). The Civil Wars: A Military History of England, Scotland and Ireland 1638–1660. Oxford: Oxford University Press. pp. 195–233. ISBN 978-0-19-280278-1.
- Kenyon, John & Ohlmeyer, Jane (2002). "The Background to the Civil Wars in the Stuart Kingdoms". In John Kenyon & Jane Ohlmeyer (eds.). The Civil Wars: A Military History of England, Scotland and Ireland 1638–1660. Oxford: Oxford University Press. pp. 3–40. ISBN 978-0-19-280278-1.
- Ohlmeyer, Jane (2002). "The Civil Wars in Ireland". In John Kenyon & Jane Ohlmeyer (eds.). The Civil Wars: A Military History of England, Scotland and Ireland 1638–1660. Oxford: Oxford University Press. pp. 73–102. ISBN 978-0-19-280278-1.
- Reese, Peter (2006). Cromwell's Masterstroke: The Battle of Dunbar 1650. Barnsley: Pen & Sword Military. ISBN 978-1-84415-179-0.
- Sadler, John; Serdiville, Rosie (2020). Cromwell's Convicts: The Death March from Dunbar 1650. Yorkshire; Philadelphia: Pen & Sword Military. ISBN 978-1-52673-820-2.
- Reid, Stuart (2008) [2004]. Dunbar 1650: Cromwell's Most Famous Victory. Oxford: Osprey Publishing. ISBN 978-1-84176-774-1.
- Royle, Trevor (2005) [2004]. Civil War: The Wars of the Three Kingdoms, 1638–1660. London: Abacus. ISBN 978-0-349-11564-1.
- "Skeletons found in mass graves are 17th Century Scottish soldiers". Scottish Soldiers Project. Durham University. 2 September 2015. Archived from the original on 11 May 2020.
- Stewart, Laura A.M. (2016). Rethinking the Scottish Revolution. Oxford: Oxford University Press. ISBN 978-0-19-871844-4.
- "The Dunbar Medal". National Portrait Gallery. 2020. Archived from the original on 26 September 2020.
- Wanklyn, Malcolm (2019). Parliament's Generals: Supreme Command and Politics During the British Wars 1642–51. Barnsley: Pen & Sword Military. ISBN 978-1-47389-836-3.
- Woolrych, Austin (2002). Britain in Revolution 1625–1660. Oxford: Oxford University Press. ISBN 978-0-19-820081-9.
- Young, John R. (1996). The Scottish Parliament 1649–1661: A Political and Constitutional Analysis. Edinburgh: John Donald Publishers. ISBN 978-0-85976-412-4.
