= Beacharra ware =

Beacharra ware, also known as Ballyalton bowls, is a style of Middle Neolithic pottery, defined by Thomas Hastie Bryce (1862–1946), which is only found in the western parts of Scotland, including Kintyre). The comparable pottery style in Ireland is known as Western Neolithic ware. British archaeologist, Stuart Piggott divided Beacharra ware into 3 groups:

- A) unornamented bag-shaped bowls
- B) decorated carinated bowls with a rim diameter smaller than the diameter at the carination with incised or channelled ornaments (arcs, straight lines and U-shaped)
- C) small bowls with panel ornaments in fine whipped cord.

== Literature ==
- Darvill, Timothy (2008). Oxford Concise Dictionary of Archaeology, 2nd ed., Oxford University Press, Oxford and New York, ISBN 978-0-19-953404-3
- Flanagan, Laurence. Ancient Ireland. Life before the Celts, Dublin, 1998. ISBN 0-7171-2433-9
- Kipfer, Barbara Ann. Dictionary of Artifacts, Oxford: Blackwell, 2007. ISBN 978-1-4051-1887-3
