= Dunbar Medal (1650) =

Campaign medal awarded for participation in the 1650 Battle of Dunbar

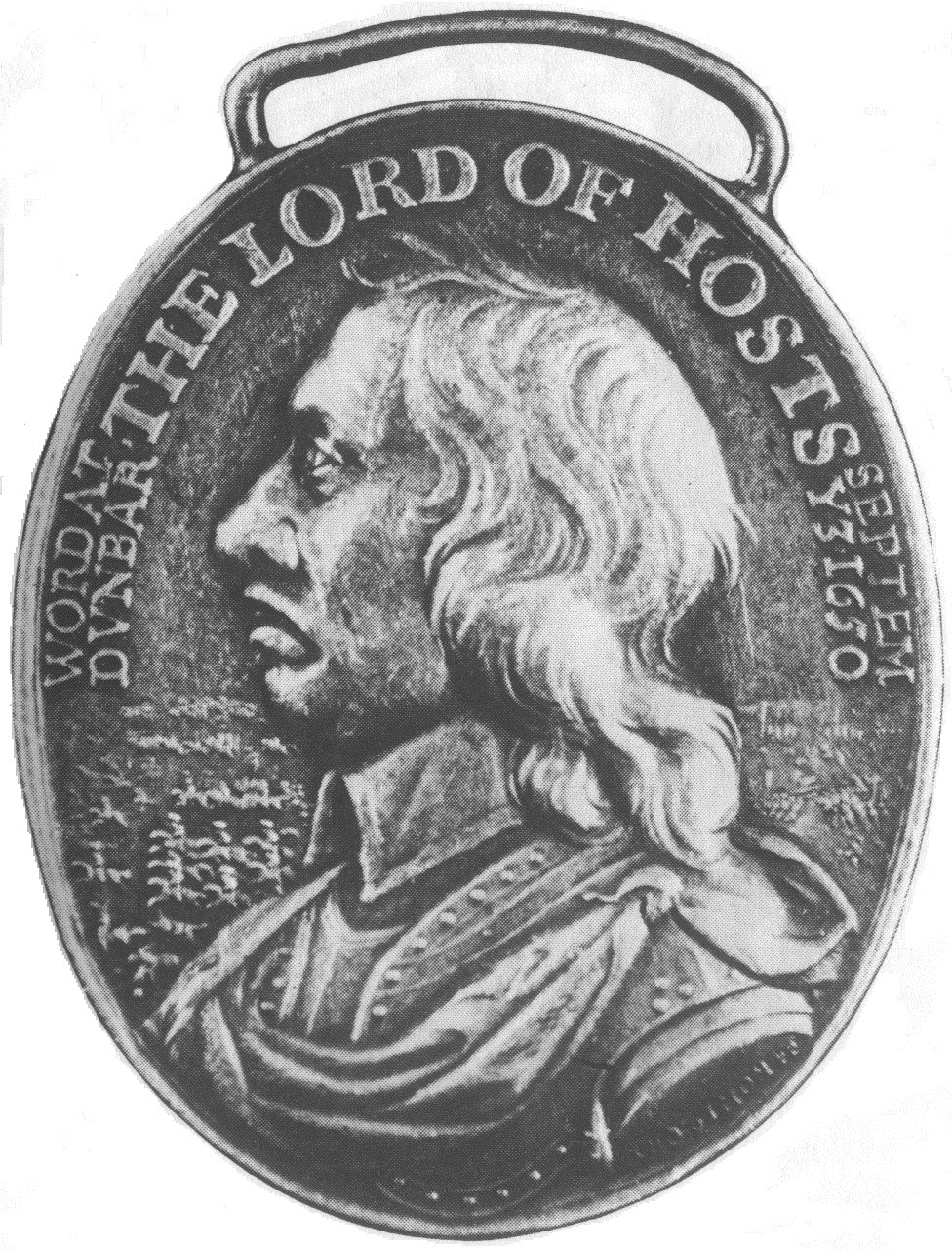
- The obverse of a silver Dunbar Medal
- Type: Campaign Medal
- Awarded for: Campaign service
- Presented by: Commonwealth of England
- Eligibility: All officers and other ranks of the New Model Army who participated in the Battle of Dunbar on 3 September 1650
- Campaign: Battle of Dunbar (3 September 1650)
- Clasps: None
- Established: 1650
- First award: 1651

The Dunbar Medal is a campaign medal of the Commonwealth of England and was sanctioned by Parliament in 1650 to be awarded to officers and other ranks of the New Model Army who participated in the Battle of Dunbar on 3 September 1650. Two versions were produced; one in gold for officers, and one in silver for other ranks. The Dunbar Medal is thought by historians and numismatists to be the first ever military medal to be eligible to every man present in a campaign or engagement, irrespective of rank. It was worn by a cord or chain around the neck. They were engraved by Thomas Simon, with an image of Oliver Cromwell on the obverse and a scene of the House of Commons on the reverse, the latter has also been found replaced in other media.

An original Dunbar Medal awarded to a soldier in Monck's Regiment of Foot (later named The Coldstream Guards), can be seen in The Guards Museum, London.

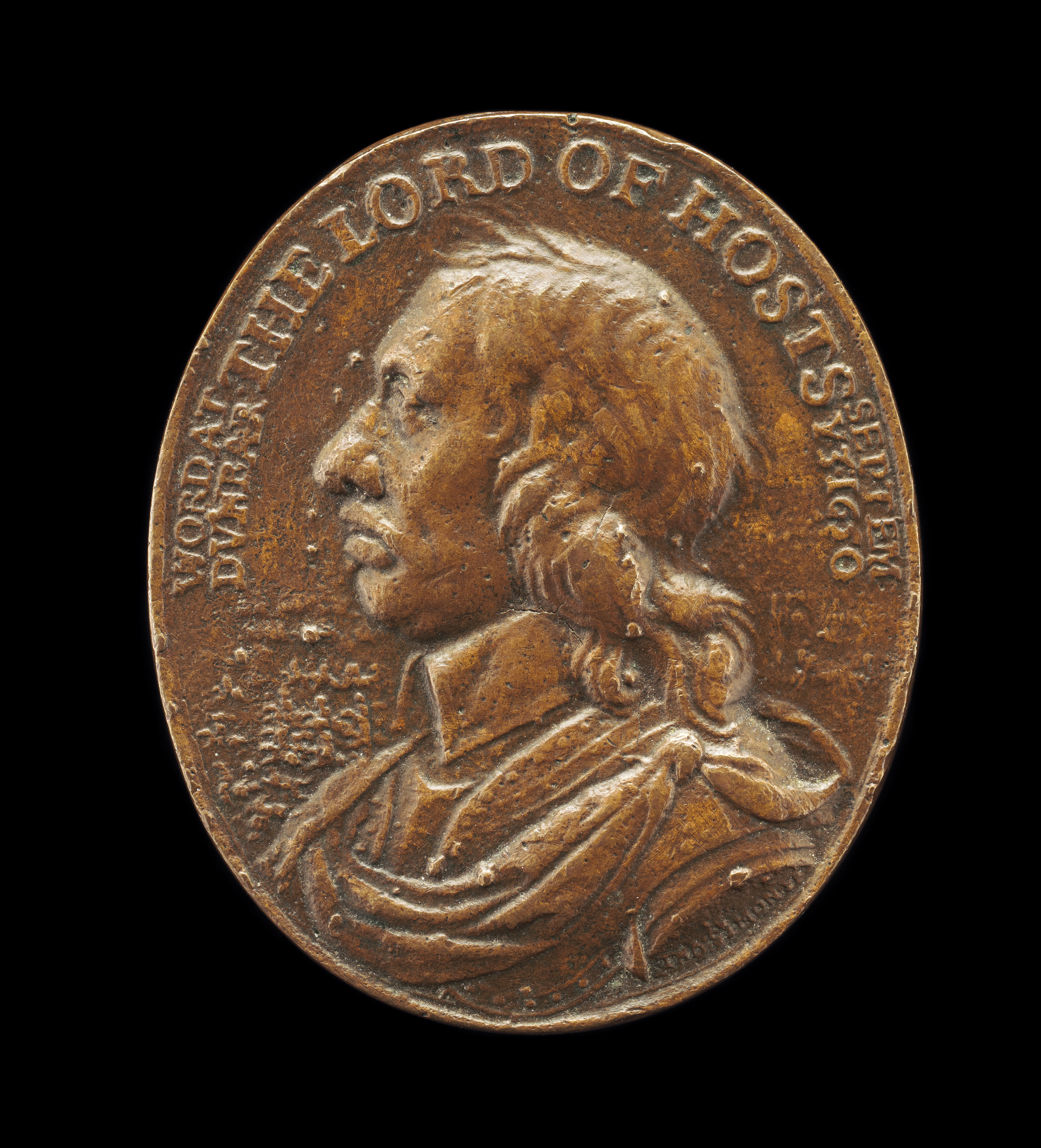
The obverse of a Dunbar Medal struck in bronze
