= James Lumsden (military officer) =

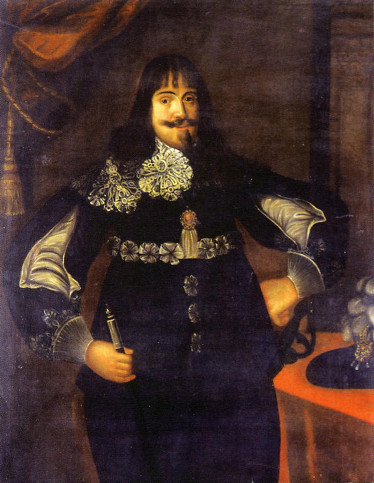
Portrait of Sir James Lumsden

James Lumsden (1598–1660) was a Scottish soldier who served in the Swedish army of Gustavus Adolphus during the Thirty Years' War, and subsequently commanded Scottish Covenanter armies.

Having commanded a regiment of Scottish soldiers in Swedish service, and fought at the Battle of Lutzen as part of John Hepburn's Green Brigade. Lumsden was made governor of Osnabrück in May 1634 which he held with his regiment until relieved by Field Marshal Alexander Leslie in 1636 against considerable odds. Lumsden left the Swedish Army in 1639 like many Scottish officers and returned to Scotland. He commanded troops during the Bishop's Wars, and in 1644 he was Sergeant Major General of Foot in General Alexander Leslie's Covenanter Army which entered England to support the English Parliament during the First English Civil War. He played a major part in the Battle of Marston Moor, and though many of his own regiment were routed, he did much to regroup the remainder and rally the reserve battalions which helped secure victory for the allied forces of the parliaments. Lumsden left an account of the battle, published anonymously

Lumsden was subsequently Lieutenant General of Horse in the Covenanter Army which, now fighting for King Charles II, was defeated at the Battle of Dunbar in 1650. He was captured, and released in 1652.
