= William P. Dunbar =

American physician

William Philipps Dunbar (1863 in Minnesota – 1922) was an American physician, director of the State Hygienic Institute in Hamburg, who made seminal discoveries about cholera control and allergies, including identifying the allergen in grass pollen and cat fur. He performed some of the earliest experiments in desensitizing pollen injection therapy.

== Overview ==
In September 1892 Dunbar went to Hamburg to help deal with a disastrous cholera epidemic. He improved the detection procedure for the cholera and other pest pathogens. He developed a regular methodology for monitoring the river and tap water, which was especially significant as this was a primary means for the spread of cholera. His pioneering research in city sanitation led the European Water Association to award a "Dunbar Medal" for outstanding scientific contributions to the waste water treatment and water protection. The "Dunbar Medal" was first awarded in 1973, and is awarded every three years.

== Allergy control contributions ==
Dunbar devised techniques for collecting pure pollen, because sample contamination had previously led to unverifiable results. He developed methodologies for testing patients' sensitivity to certain pollens by minuscule exposure to pollen via their eyes or nasal passages, By using high-quality lab techniques, he was able to eliminate a number of theories about "hay fever" that were current in the late 1800s. Dunbar determined that it was the dried cat saliva on cat hair that caused the allergic reaction. With regard to grass pollen, Dunbar identified the albumin fraction as the active toxin, discovered changes in the blood that accompanied exposure to the pollen, and was able to grade individual's relative susceptibility to each type of pollen. Much of his work on allergies is summed up in his 1913 publication "The present state of knowledge of hay fever".
