= Grimston-Lyles Hill ware =

Early British Neolithic pottery style

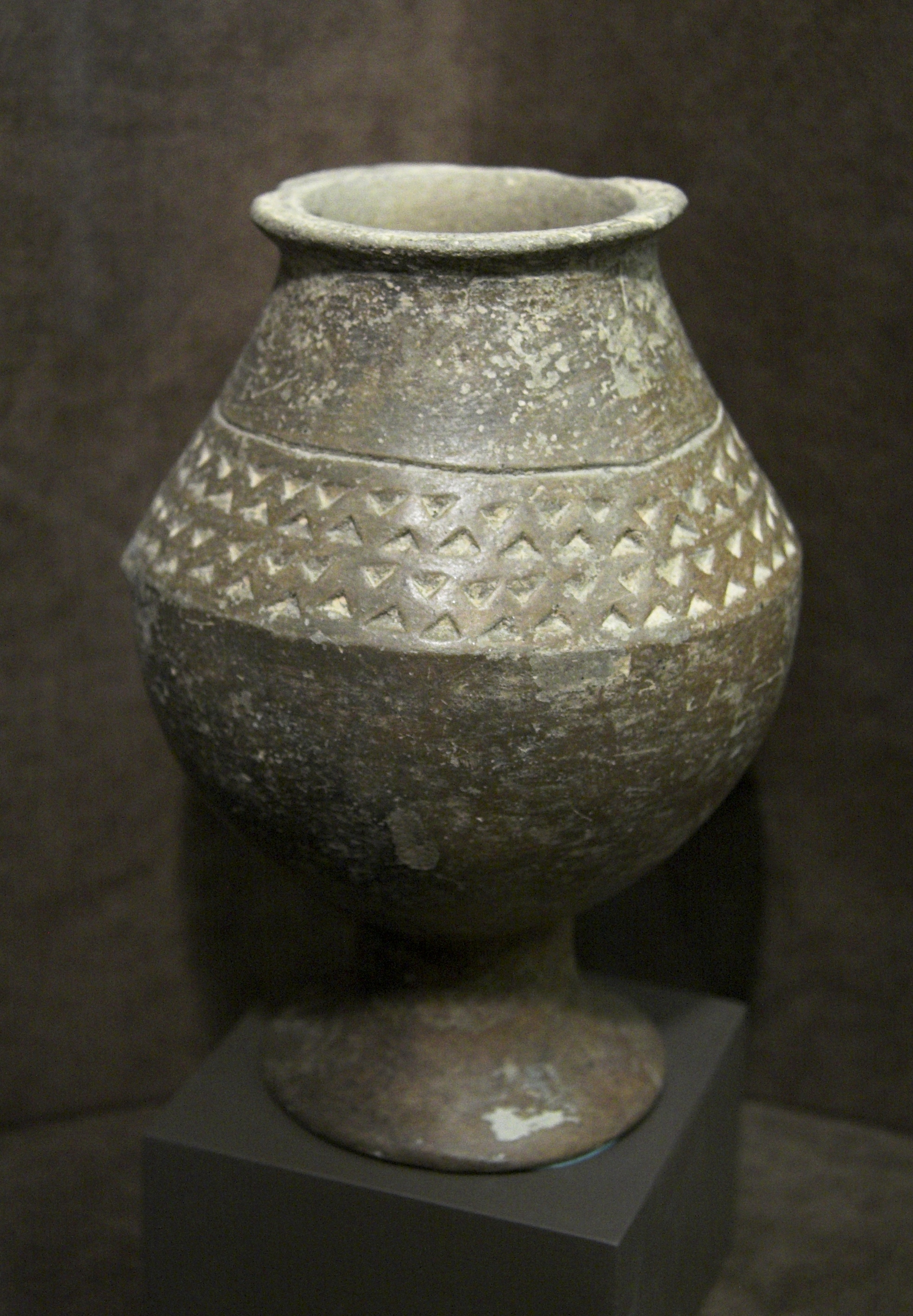
Grimson-Lyles Hill ware

Grimston-Lyles Hill ware or Grimston ware (more recently CB ware) is an Early and Middle Neolithic pottery originally named after the site where it was found in the north east of England, "Hanging Grimston", a long barrow in the former East Riding area of Yorkshire.

In 1974, Isobel Smith expanded this term because she discovered the vessels spread across the British Isles to Lyles Hill in Northern Ireland. The vessels represent the earliest pottery style of the British Stone Age.

The long-lasting Grimston-Lyles Hill ware is characterized by its use of fine materials, good workmanship and kumpf-like shapes with a shoulder profile and turned-over edge. More recently, the term "carinated bowl" (CB) or "shouldered bowl" has been preferred, although there are also shoulder-less specimens. All are (except for occasional finger fluting) unadorned.

Alison Sheridan makes a distinction between the earliest manifestation of pottery, the "traditional CB" and its later developments, "modified (or developed) CB". "Traditional CB" pottery is significantly more consistent and distributed across a wide area in Great Britain and Ireland, while "modified CB" shows regional differences.

A 2018 report from English Heritage used Bayesian analysis to estimate when carinated bowls first appeared in England, and when they ceased to be made. They concluded that these bowls first appeared in England shortly before 4000 BC, and continued to be made until the middle of the 4th millennium BC. (Note: The start date of the range was estimated to be 4245-3975 BC, and the end of the range was estimated to be 3625-3395 BC (both with 95% confidence).)

== Sources ==
- Barclay, Alistair J.; et al. (2018). Dating the earliest Neolithic ceramics of Wessex (Report). English Heritage.
- Darvill, Timothy (2008). Oxford Concise Dictionary of Archaeology, 2nd ed., Oxford University Press, Oxford and New York, ISBN 978-0-19-953404-3.
- Fowler, Chris; Jan Harding and Daniela Hofmann, The Oxford Handbook of Neolithic Europe, Oxford: OUP, 2015.
- Sheridan, Alison. French connections I: spreading the marmites thinly. In: I. Armit et al. (eds.): Neolithic settlement in Ireland and Western Britain. Oxford: Oxbow, 2003.
