= Badshot Lea Long Barrow =

Unchambered long barrow in England

Coordinates: 51°13′27″N 0°46′07″W

Badshot Lea Long Barrow, also known as Farnham Long Barrow, was an unchambered long barrow located near the village of Badshot Lea in the south-eastern English county of Surrey. It was probably constructed in the fourth millennium BCE, during Britain's Early Neolithic period.

Archaeologists have established that the monument was built by pastoralist communities shortly after the introduction of agriculture to Britain from continental Europe. Although representing part of an architectural tradition of long barrow building that was widespread across Neolithic Europe, the Badshot Lea Long Barrow is the only known example in Surrey. The nearest examples are the Medway Megaliths, clustered around the River Medway in Kent, and the long barrows of Sussex.

Built out of earth, the long barrow consisted of a tumulus flanked by side ditches. A timber post was embedded into the eastern end of the mound. By the mid-1930s, chalk quarrying adjacent to the long barrow had destroyed much of its southern side. In 1936, local resident W. F. Rankine discovered ox bones and stone arrow-heads in the vicinity of the site. An excavation was launched under the directorship of Alexander Keiller and Stuart Piggott, who sought to investigate the remains of the long barrow before it was destroyed by further quarrying.

== Location ==
The Badshot Lea Long Barrow, which has also been called the Farnham Long Barrow, was located near to Badshot Farm in the parish of Runfold, Surrey. Standing on the western end of the Hog's Back ridge, it was on a slope of Upper Chalk overlooking the Blackwater Gravels below. It stood at approximately 85 metres (280 ft) above sea level.

== Context ==
In 1987, the archaeologists David Field and Jonathan Cotton stated Badshot Lea Long Barrow was "the most impressive Neolithic feature yet located within the historic county" of Surrey. There are few known Neolithic monuments in Surrey, with most information about the area during the Neolithic period deriving from discoveries of worked flint scatters. Among the other known monuments from this period are a causewayed enclosure at Staines and a cursus monument at Stanwell.

Archaeologists believe that the primary importance of Badshot Lea Long Barrow is its location, isolated from other known examples of long barrows. The nearest known long barrows are at Freefolk (22 miles to the west), Hinton Ampner (20 miles to the west/southwest), Old Winchester Hill (22 miles to the west/southwest) and Up Marden (21 miles to the west/southwest). The next nearest group are the Medway Megaliths, a cluster of chambered long barrows in northwest Kent, which are located approximately 89 kilometres (55 mi) away. The archaeologist Ronald Jessup suggested that the North Downs Trackway might have served as a link between these different locations. Three earthen long barrows—Julliberrie's Grave, Jacket's Field Long Barrow, and Shrub's Wood Long Barrow—are also found near the River Stour in Kent, approximately 120 kilometres (75 mi) from the Badshot Lea Long Barrow. The archaeologist Ian Kinnes classed the Badshot Lea example alongside the Preston Candover Long Barrow in Hampshire as the two known examples located on the North Downs.

Material recovered from primary silts in the ditches of the Badshot Lea Long Barrow included charcoal produced from burnt hazel as well as a molluscan assemblage including snails which favoured damp scrub conditions. This evidence indicates the nature of the environment around the long barrow shortly after it was constructed in the Early Neolithic period.

== Design and construction ==
Badshot Lea Long Barrow was an earthen long barrow. At the time of the site's excavation during the 1930s, the tumulus had been completely destroyed. Excavators believed that extensive agricultural activity had largely levelled it, although most of it had also been quarried away from the south. The excavators believed that this tumulus was once approximately 43 metres (140 ft) in length, and that it had probably been higher at the eastern end than the western end. No human bone was found at the site.

The northern and southern sides of the tumulus were flanked with flat-bottomed, parallel ditches. It was from these that the chalk used to build up the mound may have been dug. Excavators found that the northern ditch measured 35 metres (116 ft) in length and that its depth varied; at the western end it measured 1.12 metres (3 ft 8 in) below the 1930s turf-level, while at the eastern end it measured 1.91 metres (6 ft 3 in) beneath that depth. By the 1930s, most of the southern ditch had been destroyed by quarrying, preventing archaeologists from determining its exact dimensions. However, the lack of any evidence for such a ditch on an area to the south-west of the tumulus led the excavators to suggest that the southern ditch was shorter than its northern counterpart. They also estimated that the average width between the northern and southern ditches was approximately 15 metres (50 ft).

At the eastern end of the monument, the northern and southern ditches did not meet, but left a causeway measuring 12 metres (40 ft) between them. In the middle of this causeway was a posthole cut 0.15 metres (0 ft 6 in) into the undisturbed chalk. This would have held a wooden post which was probably contemporary with the rest of the structure. Given how shallow the posthole was, it was probably that the eastern end of the earthen mound had also helped to support the original timber post. The site's excavators believed that this post served no structural purpose and thus probably had a ritual function. The excavators also noted that evidence for a very similar post had been found in the end of the Long Barrow 163A at Thickthorn Down in Dorset.

== Finds ==
In the primary silting in the surviving part of the southern ditch, excavators recovered three small fragments of unadorned pottery, which they attributed to a period they called "Neolithic A." Radiocarbon dating of material recovered from this primary fill produced dates of 2530 BCE and 2650 BCE.

Above this primary layer of silting was a deep layer of sandy red-brown loam that filled much of the southern ditch. Found in this were fragments of a black ware vessel and one or two sherds of a pale ware vessel, as well as fragments of a vessel that the excavators believed was Early Bronze Age in date. In the same layer as the "Neolithic B" pottery from this ditch were also found the cutting edge of a broken polished flint axe and three stone scrapers.

The sandy red-brown loam that filled the southern ditch was also found filling much of the northern ditch. This layer contained many ceramic sherds which the archaeologists attributed to the period "Neolithic B", later identified as Mortlake ware. Many of the sherds of this type found in the northern ditch all belonged to the same vessel. As the sherds were distributed throughout the loam layer, it was believed that this deposit must have entered the ditch in an exceedingly rapid manner. This broken vessel had a bevelled rim and hollow neck. Decoration was provided by twisted cord impressions as well as a series of criss-cross lines incised into the clay, probably with a flint flake. The hollow of the neck of the vessel also included some small finger-tip impressions, while the interior of the rim included a series of pendant semicircles possibly made by pressing a bird-bone into the clay.

Also in the northern ditch were sherds of a large vessel which had been decorated with the impressions of a twisted cord. Excavation of the northern ditch also recovered two flint arrow-heads. One of these was leaf-shaped and unbroken; the other was broken, with only the point remaining. These arrow-heads were found in association with the bones of ox as well as the bones and antlers of red deer. Radiocarbon dating of some of this bone carried out during the 1980s produced dates of 2650 BCE and 2470 BCE.

== Archaeological investigation ==
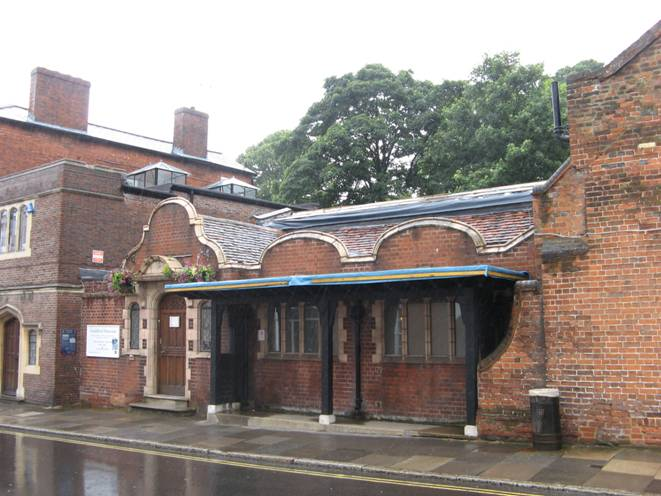
Finds from the excavation of the long barrow have been placed on display in Guildford Museum

Prior to 1936, much of the southern ditch and the tumulus of Badshot Lea Long Barrow had been destroyed by a chalk quarrying operation. That year, plans were put forward to extend the quarry northward, obliterating what was left of the Neolithic monument. A resident of Badshot Lea, W. F. Rankine, (Note: Rankine was largely a specialist in the study of Mesolithic Britain; he explored various fields around Farnham and Tilford during the 1930s, identifying prehistoric flint tools.) investigated the area due to be quarried, recovering ox bones and two leaf-shaped stone arrow heads.

Rankine brought his discoveries to the attention of W. G. Lowther, a member of the Society of Antiquaries of London. Lowther then visited the site and determined that it had archaeological value. He approached the Morven Institute of Archaeological Research to see if they would organise an excavation. The Institute then launched an excavation directed by Alexander Keiller and Stuart Piggott, who were assisted by Lowther, the Institute’s foreman W. E. V. Young, and a team of labourers paid for by the Surrey Archaeological Society. Permission to conduct the excavation on land that was part of Badshot Farm was provided by its owner, Mr Tice, who ensured that the quarrying was delayed to allow the archaeologists time to complete their investigation.

As ditches were the only feature that was clearly visible, the excavators initially believed that they were dealing with a Neolithic causewayed enclosure. As they continued, they realised that the ditches had once flanked a long barrow which was now barely evident. Most of the long barrow had already been destroyed by the quarrying, but a cross-section of the eastern face was exposed. Keiller and Piggott subsequently wrote up an excavation report on the long barrow which was published by Surrey Archaeological Society as part of their 1939 volume, A Survey of the Prehistory of the Farnham District (Surrey). Surrey Archaeological Society loaned a ceramic vessel recovered at the site to Guildford Borough Council, who put it on display in Guildford Museum. During the 1980s, several animal bones recovered during the excavation were subject to radiocarbon dating.
