= Shrub's Wood Long Barrow =

English long barrow

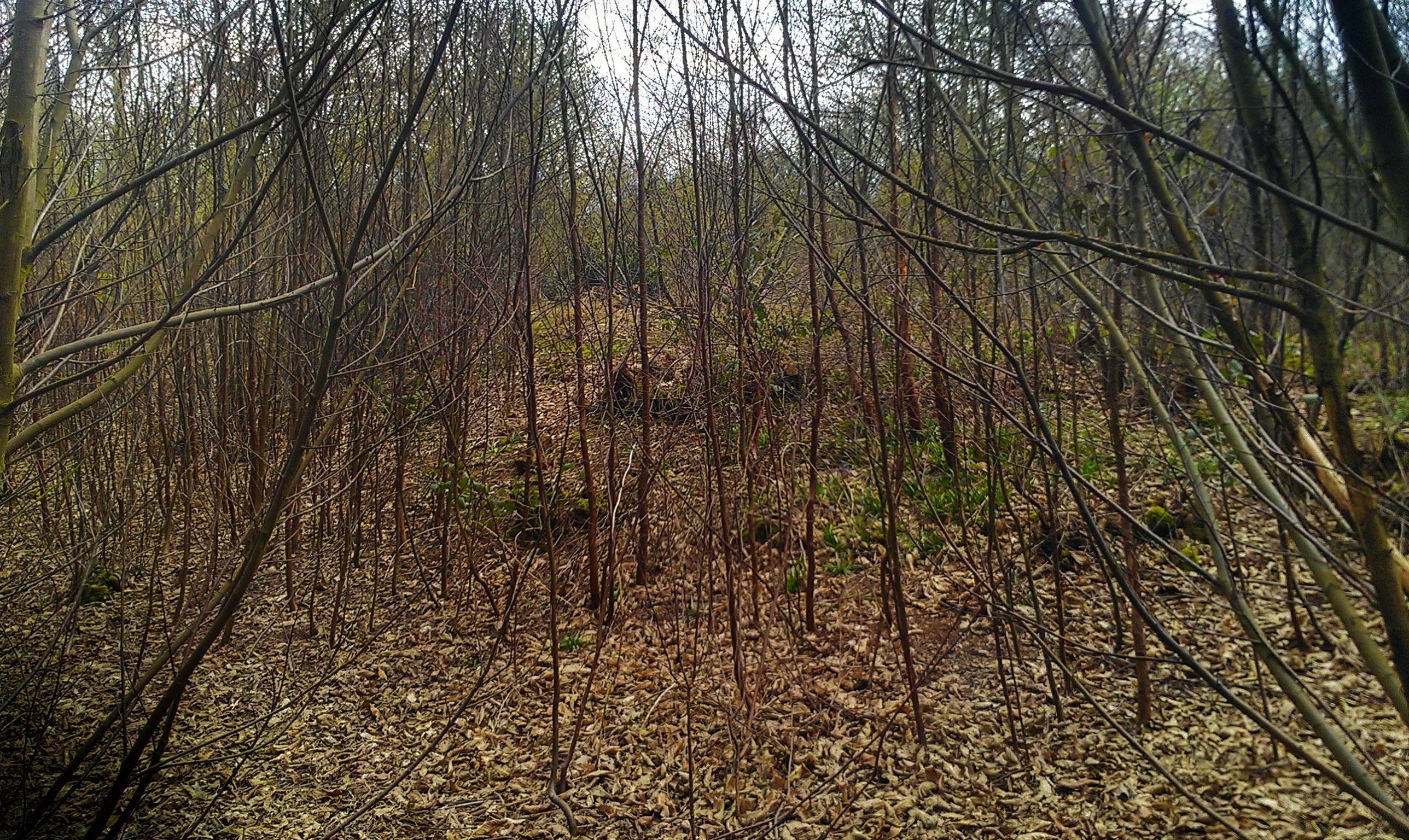
- Shrub's Wood Long Barrow is found within woodland and has trees growing in it

- Location within Kent
- 51.17357°N 1.00178°E
- Type: Long barrow
- Location: Elmsted, Kent

History
- Built: Early Neolithic

Scheduled monument
- Designated: 1969
- Reference no.: 1012523

Shrub's Wood Long Barrow is an unchambered long barrow located near to the village of Elmsted in the south-eastern English county of Kent. It was probably constructed in the fourth millennium BCE, during Britain's Early Neolithic period. Built out of earth, the long barrow consists of a sub-trapezoidal tumulus flanked by side ditches.

Archaeologists have established that the monument was built by a pastoralist community shortly after the introduction of agriculture to Britain from continental Europe. Although representing part of an architectural tradition of long-barrow building that was widespread across Neolithic Europe, Shrub's Wood Long Barrow belongs to a localised regional variant of barrows produced in the vicinity of the River Stour. Of these, it lies on the eastern side of the river with Julliberrie's Grave, while the third known example in this tumuli group, Jacket's Field Long Barrow, is located on the western side. Shrub's Wood Long Barrow was discovered in the late 1960s, although it has yet to undergo thorough archaeological investigation.

== Location ==
Shrub's Wood Long Barrow is in an area of woodland, the eponymous Shrub's Wood, near the village of Elmsted. It can be inspected from an adjacent public path. The barrow stands on a sandy sub-soil that is part of the Lenham Beds. The North Downs trackway is around 2 kilometres (1.2 mi) to the south-west of the barrow.

== Context ==
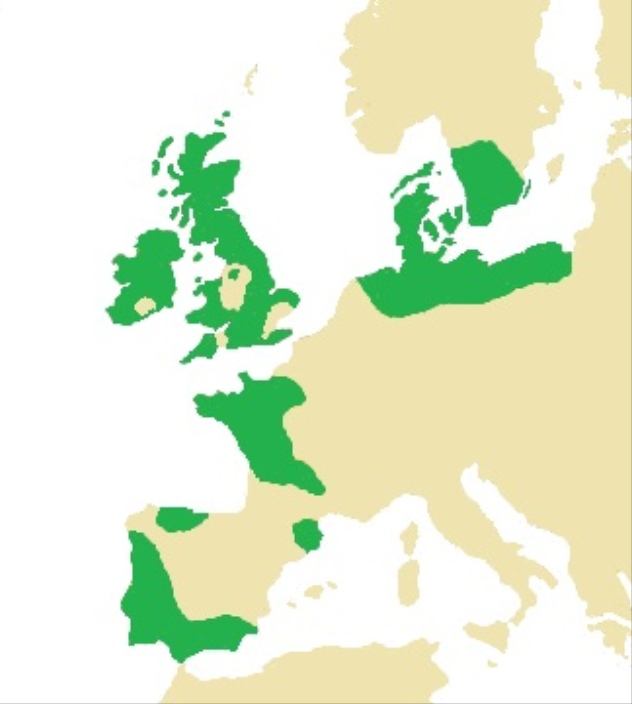
The construction of long barrows and related funerary monuments took place in various parts of Europe during the Early Neolithic (distribution pictured)

The Early Neolithic was a revolutionary period of British history. Between 4500 and 3800 BCE, it saw a widespread change in lifestyle as the communities living in the British Isles adopted agriculture as their primary form of subsistence, abandoning the hunter-gatherer lifestyle that had characterised the preceding Mesolithic period. This came about through contact with continental societies, although it is unclear to what extent this can be attributed to an influx of migrants or to indigenous Mesolithic Britons adopting agricultural technologies from the continent. The region of modern Kent would have been a key area for the arrival of continental European settlers and visitors because of its position on the estuary of the River Thames and its proximity to the continent.

Britain was largely forested in this period; widespread forest clearance did not occur in Kent until the Late Bronze Age (c.1000 to 700 BCE). Throughout most of Britain, there is little evidence of cereal agriculture or permanent dwellings from this period, leading archaeologists to believe that the Early Neolithic economy on the island was largely pastoral, relying on herding cattle, with people living a nomadic or semi-nomadic life. It is apparent that although a common material culture was shared throughout most of the British Isles in this period, there was great regional variation regarding the nature and distribution of settlement, architectural styles, and the use of natural resources.

=== Stour Long Barrows ===
Across Western Europe, the Early Neolithic marked the first period in which humans built monumental structures in the landscape. These were tombs that held the physical remains of the dead, and, though sometimes constructed out of timber, many were built using large stones, now known as megaliths. Individuals were rarely buried alone in the Early Neolithic, instead being interred in collective burials with other members of their community. The construction of these collective burial monumental tombs, both wooden and megalithic, began in continental Europe before being adopted in Britain in the first half of the fourth millennium BCE. Many archaeologists have suggested that this is evidence for an Early Neolithic ancestor cult revolving around veneration of the spirits of the dead. Given that other rites may have taken place around these long barrows, historian Ronald Hutton termed them "tomb-shrines" to reflect their dual purpose.

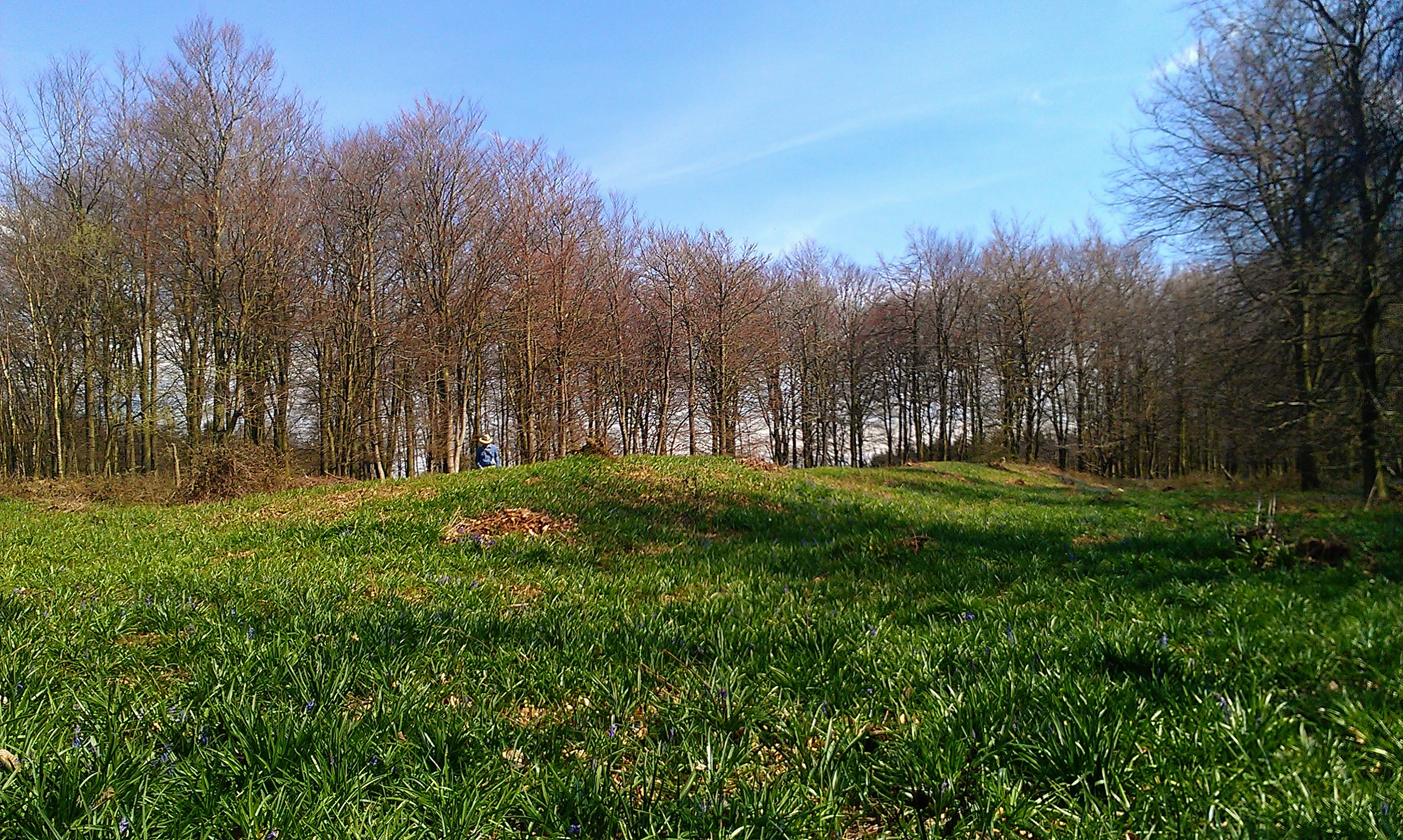
Jacket's Field Long Barrow

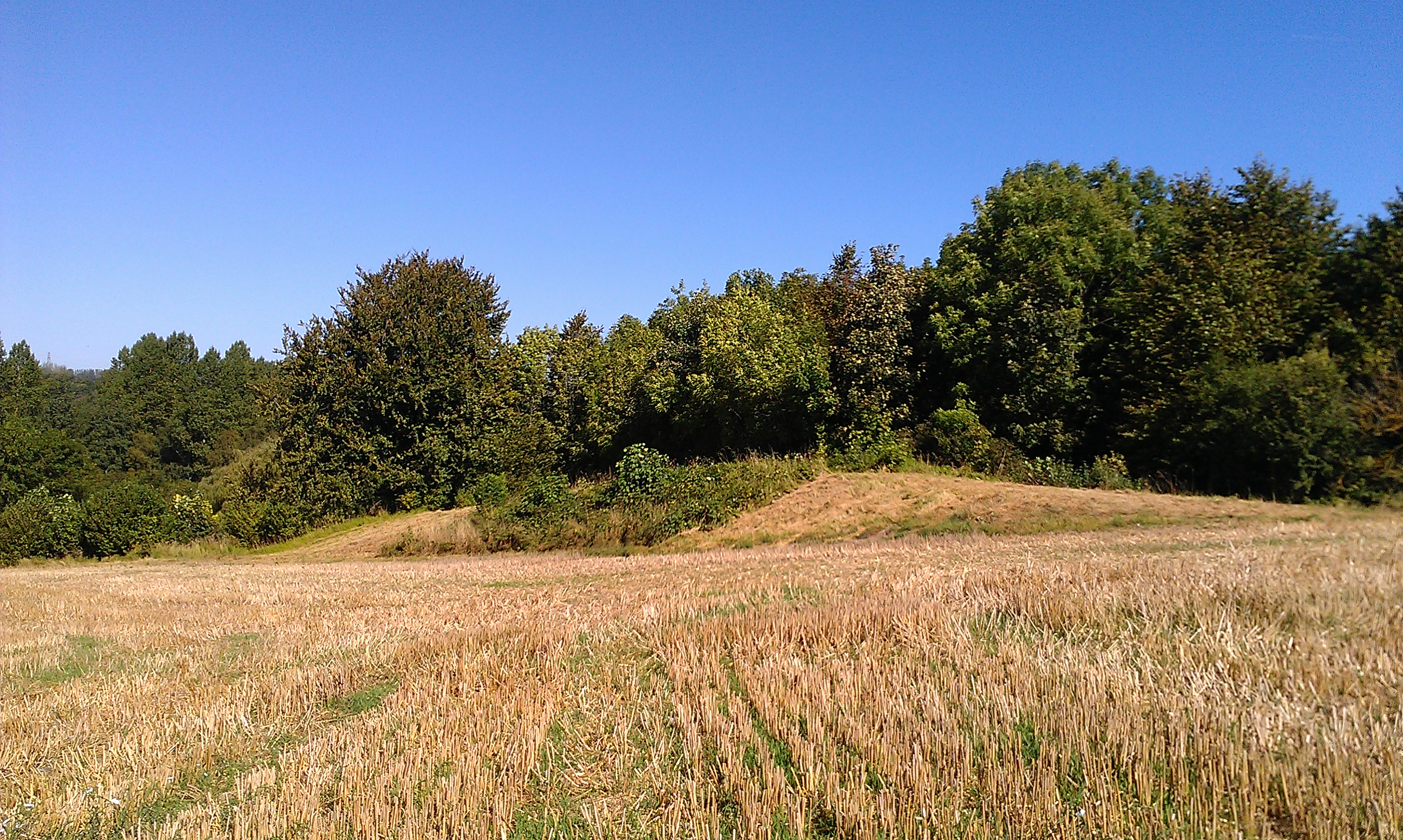
Julliberrie's Grave

In Britain, these long barrows were typically built on prominent hills and slopes overlooking the surrounding landscape, perhaps at the junction between different territories. Archaeologist Caroline Malone noted that the tombs would have served as one of a variety of markers in the landscape that conveyed information on "territory, political allegiance, ownership, and ancestors". Many archaeologists have subscribed to the idea that these tomb-shrines served as territorial markers between different tribal groups, although others have argued that such markers would be of little use to a nomadic herding society. Instead, it has been suggested that they were markers along herding pathways. Many archaeologists have suggested that the construction of such monuments reflects an attempt to stamp control and ownership over the land, thus representing a change in mindset brought about by Neolithicisation. Others have suggested that these monuments were built on sites already deemed sacred by Mesolithic hunter-gatherers.

Archaeologists are aware of around twelve Neolithic long barrows in Kent. The best-known are the Medway Megaliths found in the vicinity of the River Medway, each of which contains a stone burial chamber: the Coldrum Stones, Addington Long Barrow, Chestnuts Long Barrow, Kit's Coty House, Little Kit's Coty House, the destroyed Smythe's Megalith, and two other possible examples, the Coffin Stone and the White Horse Stone. About 38 kilometres (24 mi) east of the Medway Megaliths are the Stour Long Barrows. This distinct regional grouping consists of three known mounds: Jacket's Field Long Barrow, Julliberrie's Grave, and Shrub's Wood Long Barrow. These are within 8 kilometres (5 mi) of each other, high up on the North Downs between Canterbury and Ashford; Jacket's Field is on the western side of the River Stour and the other two on the eastern side. Unlike the Medway Megaliths, the Stour Long Barrows do not appear to have used stone as a building material. Their builders' decision against stone was likely deliberate, for sarsens are naturally present in the local area and could have been obtained had the builders wanted them.

The presence of the long barrows suggests some sort of settlement nearby in the Early Neolithic period, and two polished flint axes from the period have been found at Soakham Farm, not far from Jacket's Field Long Barrow. The North Downs trackway may have been in use at the time and would have provided routes for local people to travel west. Elsewhere in southern Britain, long barrows were often erected close to causewayed enclosures, although none of the latter have yet been discovered near to the Stour Long Barrows. Elsewhere in the southeast, there are other long barrows of the period; over 75 kilometres (47 mi) away from the Stour Long Barrows are another regional cluster in Sussex, while Badshot Lea Long Barrow, a solitary long barrow, is known at Badshot Farm in Farnham, Surrey.

== Description ==
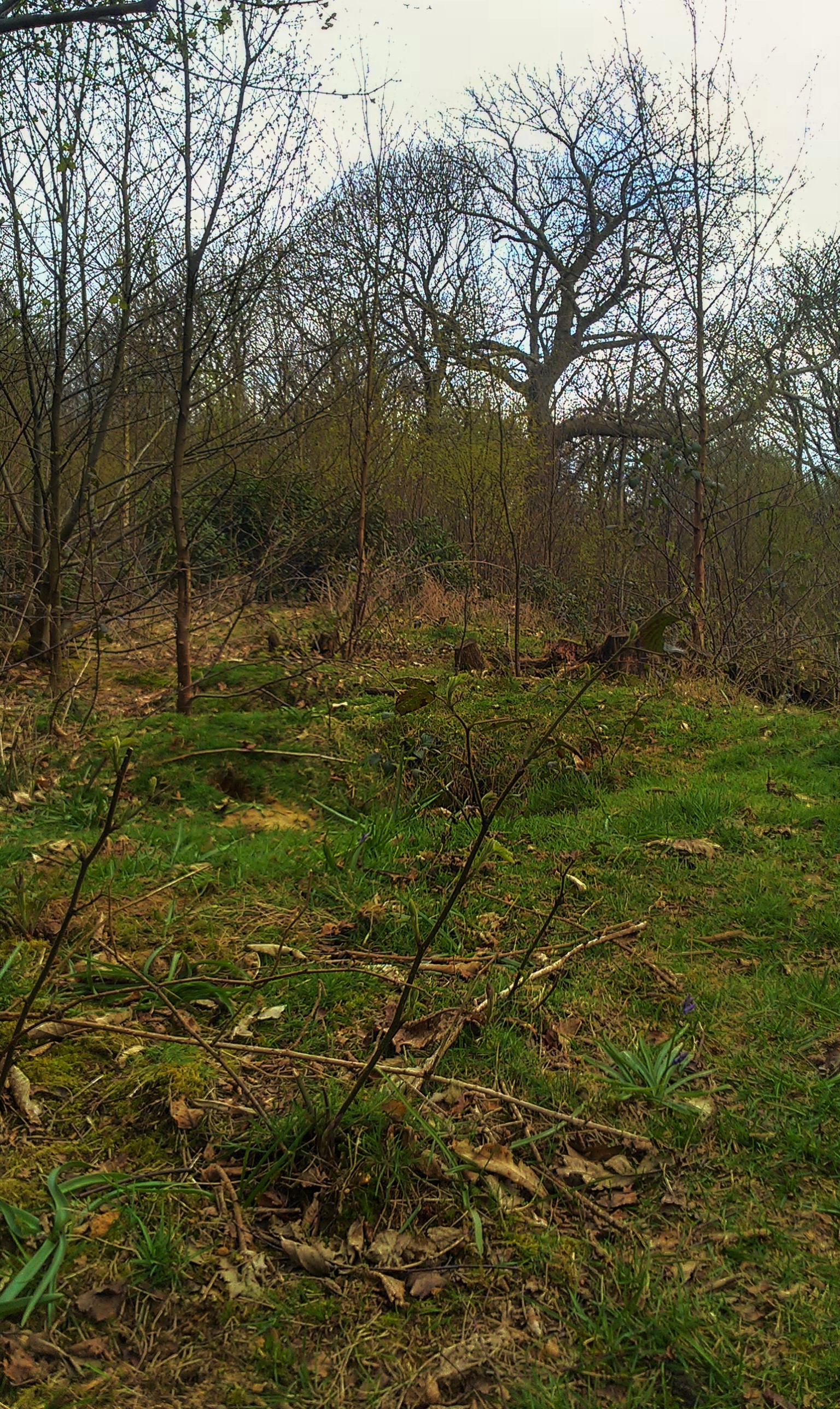
The surface of the Shrub's Wood Long Barrow

Shrub's Wood Long Barrow is oval in shape and has a maximum width of 19 metres (62 ft). Aligned on an east-to-west axis, it is 38 metres (120 ft) long. At its eastern end, the long barrow is 2 metres high, and a little less than that at its western end. There is evidence of side ditches flanking the mound, which are slightly curved in shape and measure between 5 and 7 metres (16 and 23 ft) in width. According to its English Heritage listing, it is "amongst the finest surviving oval barrows in the South-East".

== Discovery ==
While Julliberrie's Grave had been known to antiquarians since at least the 16th century, Shrub's Wood Long Barrow—as well as Jacket's Field Long Barrow—was only discovered by later archaeological investigation. Archaeologist Ronald Jessup, who excavated Julliberrie's Grave in the 1930s, suggested the likelihood that other long barrows would also be found in the area. In 1970, J. Bradshaw reported in Archaeologia Cantiana that Shrub's Wood Long Barrow had been "recently recorded". On discovery, it was made a scheduled monument. As of 2007, neither Shrub's Wood Long Barrow nor Jacket's Field Long Barrow had undergone archaeological excavation.
