= Preston Candover Long Barrow =

Long barrow in Hampshire, England

Coordinates: 51.1590°N 1.1366°W

Preston Candover Long Barrow is an unchambered long barrow located near to the village of Preston Candover in the south-eastern English county of Hampshire.

The archaeologist Ian Kinnes classed the Preston Candover example alongside the Badshot Lea Long Barrow in Surrey as the two known examples located on the North Downs.

== Finds ==
A spearhead and a seax probably dating from the seventh or eighth century, during England's early medieval period, have been recovered from the Preston Candover Barrow. In the late nineteenth century, an iron spearhead was recovered from inside the barrow. T. W. Shore thought it might be Early Iron Age in date, although Christopher Hawkes later established that it was early medieval, of a style dating from the fifth, sixth, or seventh century. A scramasax was also reported as having been found from the edge of the barrow, and was in the collection of Basingstoke Museum by the late 1930s. Writing in 1940, Hawkes expressed hope that archaeological excavation might reveal more about early medieval activity at the barrow.

== Archaeological investigation ==
In the late nineteenth century, the Reverend Sumner Wilson and T. W. Shore expressed the opinion that the Preston Candover barrow was stylistically a long barrow. O. G. S. Crawford disagreed with this assessment and on the Ordnance Survey map it was instead classified as a round barrow. Two other individuals, G. W. Willis of Basingstoke Museum and J. R. Ellaway, subsequently informed Hawkes that the original identification was correct, and that the tumulus had only taken on the appearance of a round barrow after being deformed by agricultural levelling in recent decades.
