= Elmsted =

Village in Kent, England

Coordinates: 51.1643°N 1.0265°E

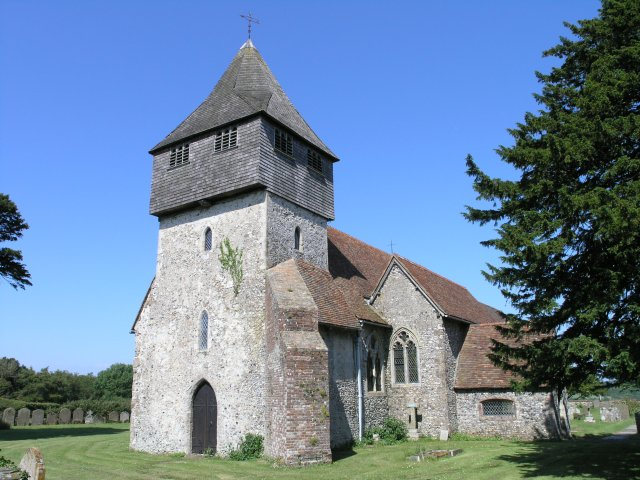
- St James has an unusual belfry on the tower

- Location within Kent
- Population: 312 (parish, 2021 Census)
- OS grid reference: TR115449
- District: Folkestone and Hythe
- Shire county: Kent
- Region: South East
- Country: England
- Sovereign state: United Kingdom
- Post town: Ashford
- Postcode district: TN25
- Post town: Canterbury
- Postcode district: CT4
- Dialling code: 01233
- Police: Kent
- Fire: Kent
- Ambulance: South East Coast
- UK Parliament: Folkestone and Hythe

Elmsted is a small village and civil parish in the Folkestone and Hythe District of Kent, England. It lies west of Stone Street (the B2068), a Roman road connecting Canterbury and Lympne. The parish includes the hamlets of Bodsham, North Leigh, and Evington. Elmsted had a population of 312 according to the 2021 Census.

The village is known for its rural character, historic connections, and scattered settlements reflecting its agricultural origins. Elmsted's parish council consists of six elected members who oversee local matters.

The name "Elmsted" originates from the abundance of elm trees that once grew in the area during Saxon times, combined with "sted," meaning 'place' in Old English. Its focal point is St James the Great Church, a Grade I listed building, notable for its medieval origins and unusual wooden belfry.

Despite its small size, Elmsted maintains a strong community spirit, supported by local amenities such as Bodsham Church of England Primary School, a pub, and several bed-and-breakfasts that contribute to its rural economy.

== Geography ==
Elmsted is a small parish encompassing an area of approximately 10 km square with its population scattered in small hamlets like Bodsham, North Leigh and Elmsted Court. Settlements are largely at the top of the chalky down land with surrounding, lowland areas being used for grazing Cattle and Sheep and other farming . In these lower areas the ground contains far more in the way of clay and flint deposits than chalk. The Parish church of St James the Great lies in the center of the parish at a kilometre or two from the parish boundary in every direction. On its eastern boundary the parish largely follows parallel to the Roman Road Stone Street. However it dips into the hamlets of Stelling Minnis and into Sixmile cottages. The parish itself is 11 kilometres east of Ashford which is the nearest town.

The settlements in the parish are very scattered which can largely be attributed to the agricultural nature of the parish. Homesteads would be built next to the land that the people living in them farmed. The laborers on the farms would then walk to their parish church. The parish boundaries have remained broadly consistent with only slight variations in the south-east of the parish.

The parish contains no shops or doctors surgery but does have a primary school, a pub, a cidery and a number of bed-and-breakfasts. The local school is Bodsham Church of England Primary School. The School has around 90 students and has a close link to the local church with a daily worship. It is part of the Federation of Church of England Primary Schools.

== History ==
The Roman road Stone Street defines part of the parish's eastern border. Constructed following the Roman invasion of Britain in 43 AD, the road provided a faster and more direct route between Canterbury and the south coast, facilitating the movement of troops across the Empire. Its construction also enhanced trade for surrounding areas and later served as a vital corridor for the Archbishop of Canterbury to oversee his diocese.

While Elmsted is not listed in the Domesday Book of 1086, the hamlet of Bodsham, located within the parish, is mentioned. Today, Bodsham is notable for housing the local primary school.

One of the most prominent families in the parish's history were the Honywoods, who resided at Evington from the 1400s until the early 20th century. Their legacy is evident in St James the Great Church, where the south chapel, known as the Honywood Chapel, commemorates the family's contribution to the area.

Evington Court, a key historical estate in the parish, remains a significant landmark. In August 2023, Arron Martin was named the Lord of the Manor of Evington Court, inheriting this historic title. The title, while largely ceremonial today, highlights the enduring importance of the estate in Elmsted's heritage. Though it no longer confers ownership of the estate, the Lordship reflects the area's feudal history and its connection to local traditions.

John Marius Wilson, writing in the Imperial Gazetteer of England and Wales between 1870 and 1872, described the parish as follows:

"ELMSTEAD, a parish in Elham district, Kent; 4½ miles ESE of Wye r. station, and 6½ ENE of Ashford. It has a post office under Ashford, and a fair on 25 July. Acres, 2,692. Real property, £2,692. Pop., 492. Houses, 93. The property is divided among a few. The living is a vicarage in the diocese of Canterbury. Value, £80. Patron, the Archbishop of Canterbury. The church is old but good."

Today, St James the Great Church continues to fall under the jurisdiction of the Archbishop of Canterbury. While the July 25th fair, traditionally held in honor of St James’ Day, is no longer observed, a spring fair now takes place annually on May 1st at Evington Hall.

The number of houses in Elmsted has increased significantly over the last century. In 1901, there were 93 houses in the parish; by the 2011 census, this had risen to 140.

== St James the Great ==
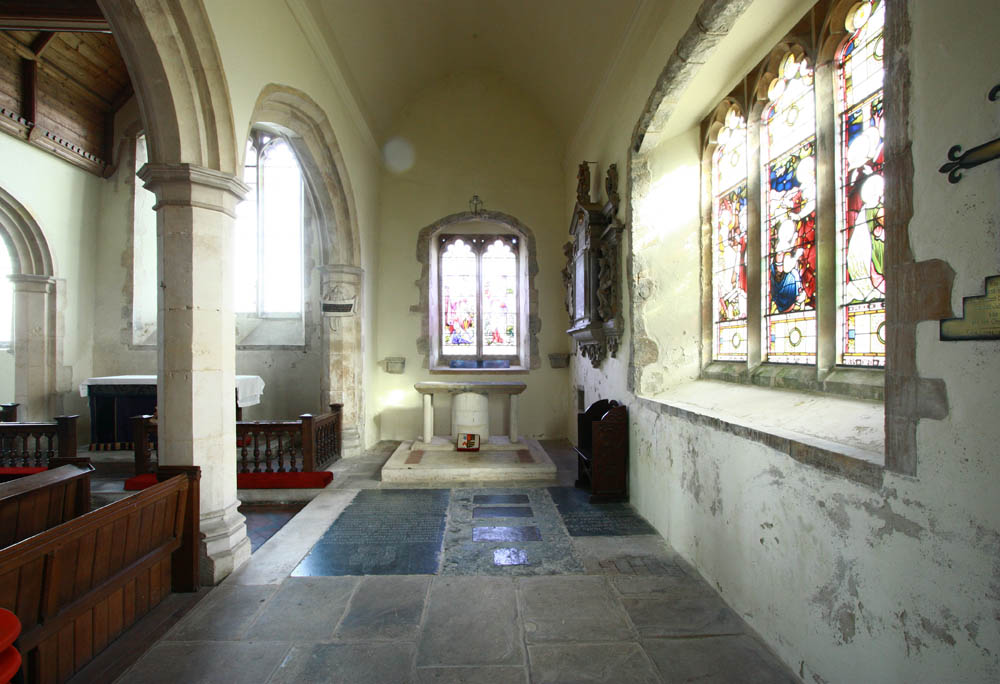
The Honywood Chapel

The Anglican church is dedicated to St James the Great and dates back to the 11th century. It was restored in 1877 by Ewan Christian. It was Grade I listed in 1966 due to its historic and architectural significance. The church has an unusual wooden medieval belfry on the tower which was constructed across the 13th and 14th centuries. There are 6 bells in the church which were cast in 1721 by John Waylet. Before this there were 4 bells in the belfry which were recorded in 1552. Much like other churches in the area its walls have been constructed with local flints. It is made up of a tower in the west, a nave with north and south aisles and a chancel with north and south chapels, all of which are open making the church open and airy. There are a number of large tablets inside the church which are all dedicated to prominent families in the parish like the Honywoods. The church hosts a 19th-century organ as well as kitchen facilities, a toilet, and a vestry which is now used for Sunday school. Every second Sunday of the month a family service is held in the church. The two chapels were both added to the Church around 1300. The South Chapel is known as both a Chapel of John the Baptist and as the Honywood Chapel, the latter because of the monuments to Sir Thomas Honywood and Sir William Honywood as well as a number of dedications to the family on monuments on the walls and ledger stones on the floor. In the 1877 restoration the family also paid for a new roof for the chapel.

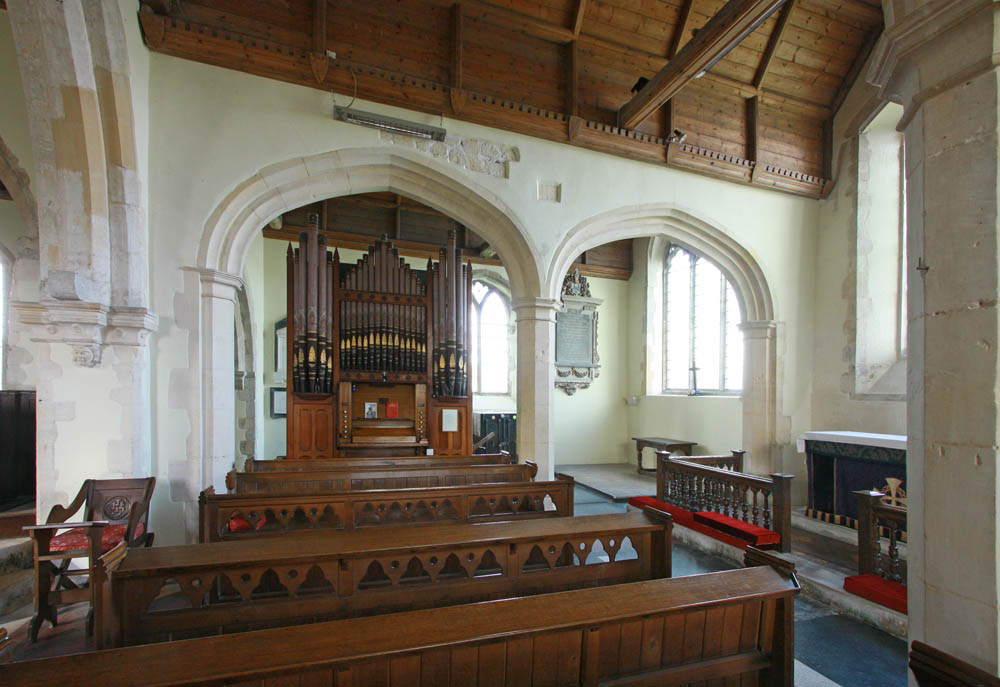
The interior of St James

== Demographics ==
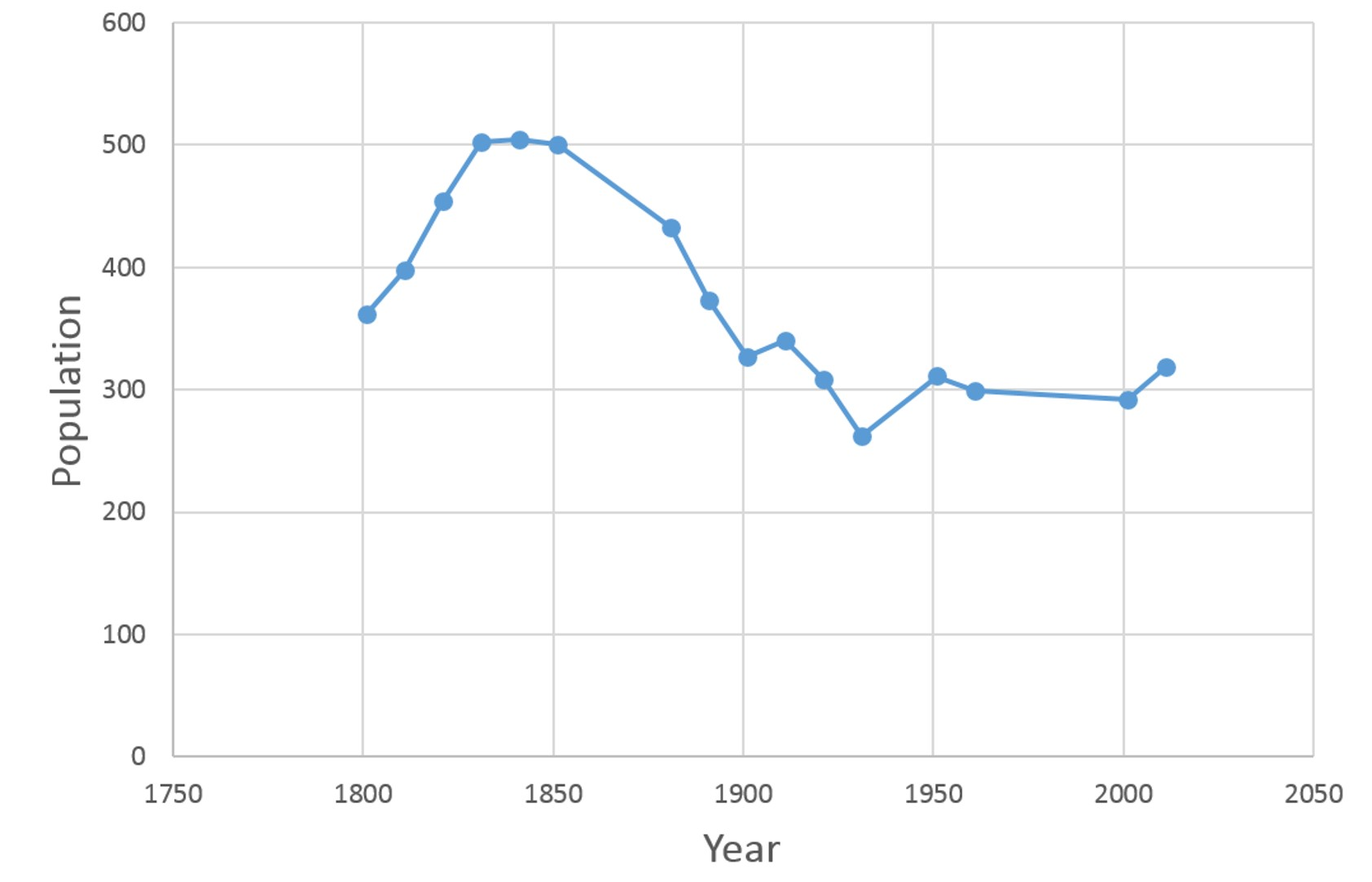

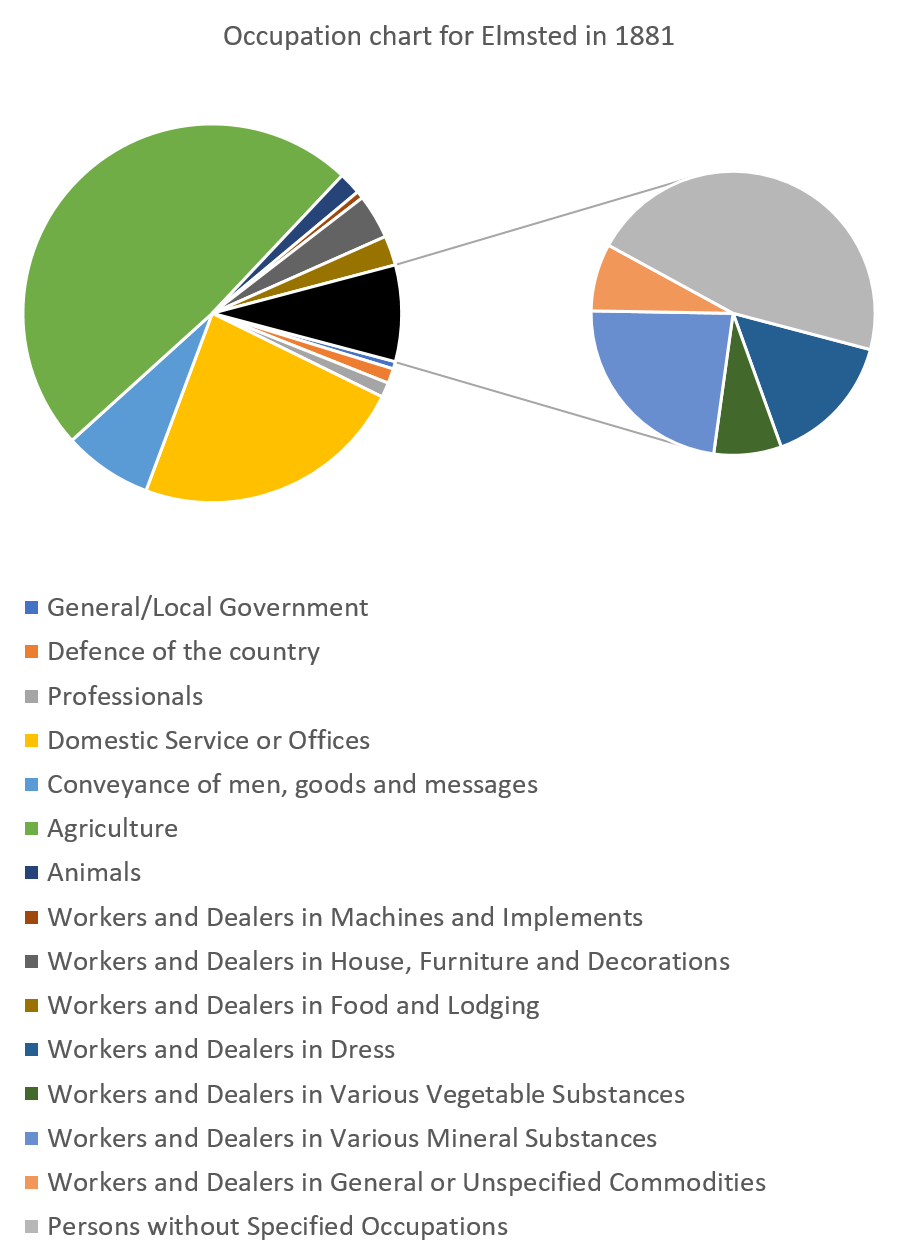
Occupations of males and females in Elmsted reported in the 1881 census.

Elmsted was featured in the 1881 census which provides information on the occupational structure of the population at the time. The majority of men and women worked in agriculture which reflects the rural nature of the small parish. The second largest group at that time were those working in domestic service or in offices. It is made up largely by women who were working at home whilst others living in the house would go out and work. Notably only 1 women was recorded as working in agriculture which shows how the industry was male dominated at the time.

After the mid 19th Century the village began a steady decrease in population from its peak in 1850 of just over 500 people to just over 250 in 1960. It has since risen somewhat back up to just under 300 people.

In 2011 according to the census data there were 156 females and 163 males living in the parish. In that same year the population was largely made up of people between 35 and 64 suggesting that there are a large number of people who commute out of, Elmsted where there are very few employers, to towns nearby. Though it is notable that in Elmsted 25.7% of economically active 16 to 74 year olds are self-employed. This is far higher than the average for England which is only 9.8%. This may be linked to the bed and breakfasts, brewery and farms which are so common in the parish which provide full-time self-employment for many residents of the parish.

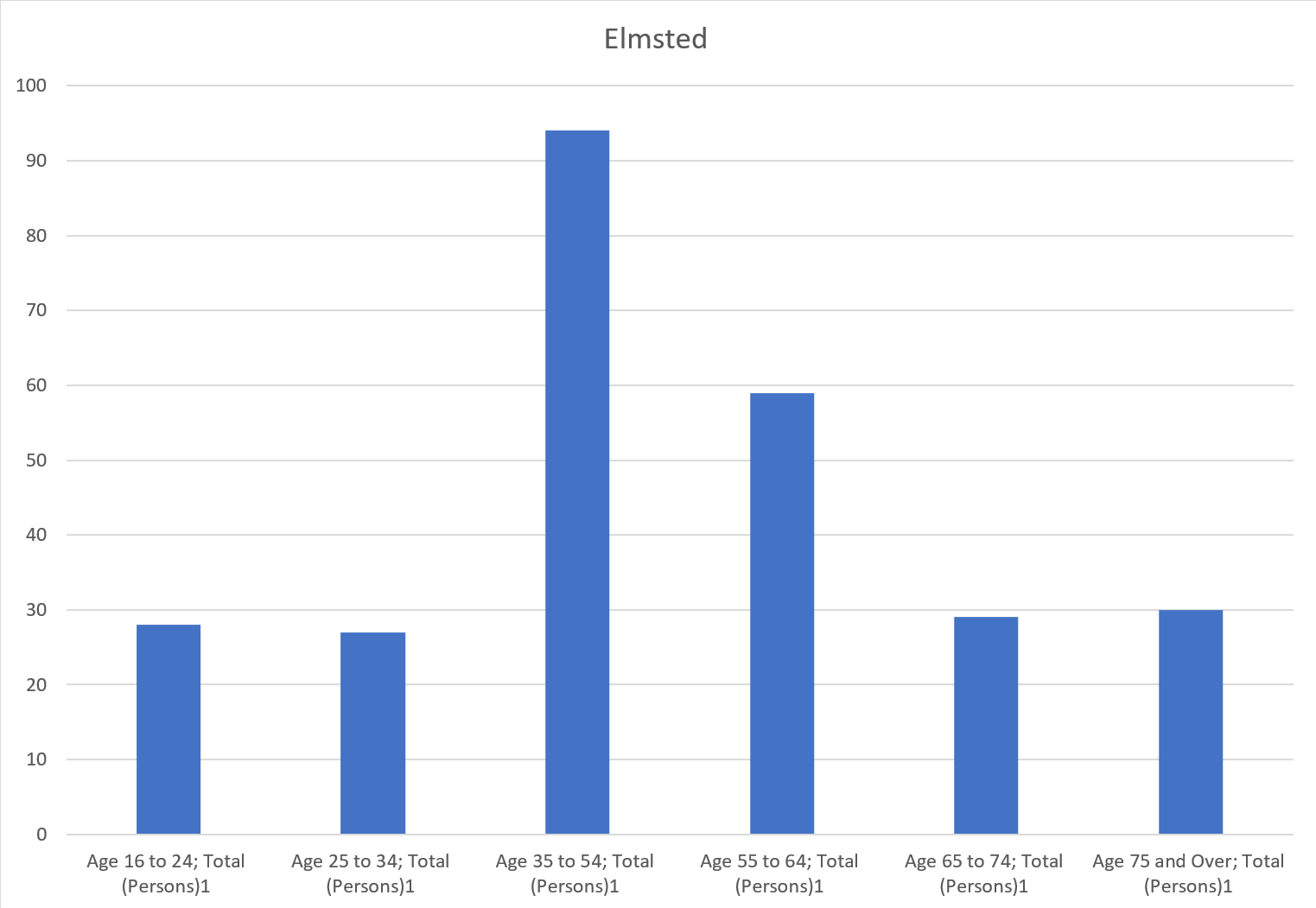
Population age groups for residents of Elmsted
