= Julliberrie's Grave =

Long barrow in Kent, England

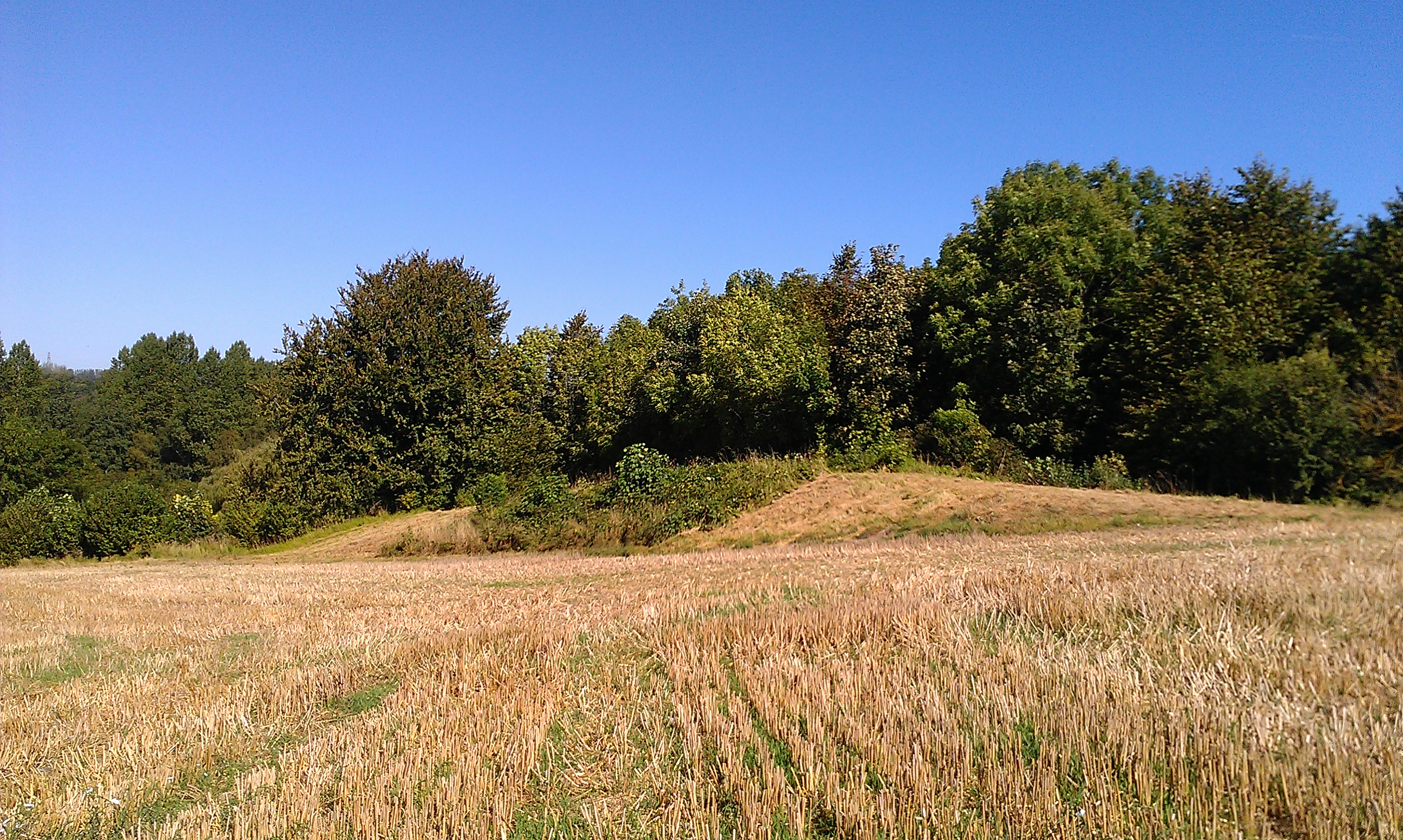

- Location within Kent
- 51.240479°N 0.974888°E
- Type: Long barrow

Scheduled monument
- Designated: 1981
- Reference no.: 1013000

Julliberrie's Grave, also known as The Giant's Grave or The Grave, is an unchambered long barrow located near to the village of Chilham in the south-eastern English county of Kent. Probably constructed in the fourth millennium BCE, during Britain's Early Neolithic period, today it survives only in a state of ruin.

Archaeologists have established that the monument was built by pastoralist communities shortly after the introduction of agriculture to Britain from continental Europe. Although representing part of an architectural tradition of long barrow building that was widespread across Neolithic Europe, Julliberrie's Grave belongs to a localised regional variant of barrows produced in the vicinity of the River Stour. Of these, it lies on the eastern side of the river, alongside the Shrub's Wood Long Barrow, while the third known example in this barrow group, Jacket's Field Long Barrow, is located on the western side.

Julliberrie's Grave is 44 metres (144 ft) long, 2 metres (6 ft 7 in) high, and 15 metres (49 ft) at its widest. It was originally larger, with the northern end having been destroyed. Unlike many other long barrows, no evidence for any Early Neolithic human remains have been found at the site; it is possible that its builders never placed human remains within it, or that such burials were included in the barrow's (since lost) northern end. A broken polished stone axe was included in the centre of the monument, which archaeologists believe was likely placed there as part of a ritual act of deposition. A rectangular pit was dug into the western side of the barrow shortly after its completion, likely containing a ritual deposit of organic material, before being refilled.

In the Iron Age, a hearth was established in the ditch circling the barrow; in the Romano-British period, human remains and a coin hoard were buried around its perimeter. Ensuing millennia witnessed local folklore grow up around the site, associating it with the burial of either a giant or an army and their horses. The ruin attracted the interest of antiquarians in the 17th century, although was heavily damaged by chalk quarrying around the 18th. During the 18th and 19th century, antiquarians dug into the barrow at least twice, while cautious archaeological excavation took place in the 1930s. A Scheduled Ancient Monument, it is accessible to visitors all year around.

== Location and status ==
Julliberrie's Grave is located on a shoulder of downland that flanks the eastern side of the River Stour. It is located just over half-a-mile southeast of St Mary's Church, Chilham, and can be inspected from an adjacent public path. It is recognised as a Scheduled Ancient Monument under British law.

== Context ==
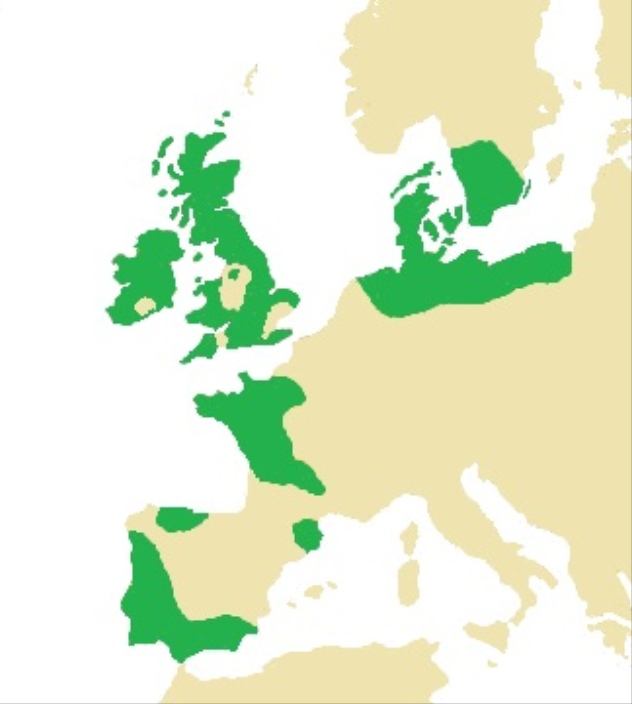
The construction of long barrows and related funerary monuments took place in various parts of Europe during the Early Neolithic (distribution pictured)

The Early Neolithic was a revolutionary period of British history. Between 4500 and 3800 BCE, it saw a widespread change in lifestyle as the communities living in the British Isles adopted agriculture as their primary form of subsistence, abandoning the hunter-gatherer lifestyle that had characterised the preceding Mesolithic period. This came about through contact with continental societies, although it is unclear to what extent this can be attributed to an influx of migrants or to indigenous Mesolithic Britons adopting agricultural technologies from the continent. The region of modern Kent would have been a key area for the arrival of continental European settlers and visitors, because of its position on the estuary of the River Thames and its proximity to the continent.

Britain was largely forested in this period; widespread forest clearance did not occur in Kent until the Late Bronze Age (c.1000 to 700 BCE). Throughout most of Britain, there is little evidence of cereal or permanent dwellings from this period, leading archaeologists to believe that the Early Neolithic economy on the island was largely pastoral, relying on herding cattle, with people living a nomadic or semi-nomadic life. It is apparent that although a common material culture was shared throughout most of the British Isles in this period, there was great regional variation regarding the nature and distribution of settlement, architectural styles, and the use of natural resources.

=== The Stour Long Barrows ===
Across Western Europe, the Early Neolithic marked the first period in which humans built monumental structures in the landscape. These were tombs that held the physical remains of the dead, and though sometimes constructed out of timber, many were built using large stones, now known as "megaliths". Individuals were rarely buried alone in the Early Neolithic, instead being interred in collective burials with other members of their community. The construction of these collective burial monumental tombs, both wooden and megalithic, began in continental Europe before being adopted in Britain in the first half of the fourth millennium BCE.

The Early Neolithic people of Britain placed far greater emphasis on the ritualised burial of the dead than their Mesolithic forebears had done. Many archaeologists have suggested that this is because Early Neolithic people adhered to an ancestor cult that venerated the spirits of the dead, believing that they could intercede with the forces of nature for the benefit of their living descendants. Given that other rites may have taken place around these monuments, historian Ronald Hutton termed them "tomb-shrines" to reflect their dual purpose.

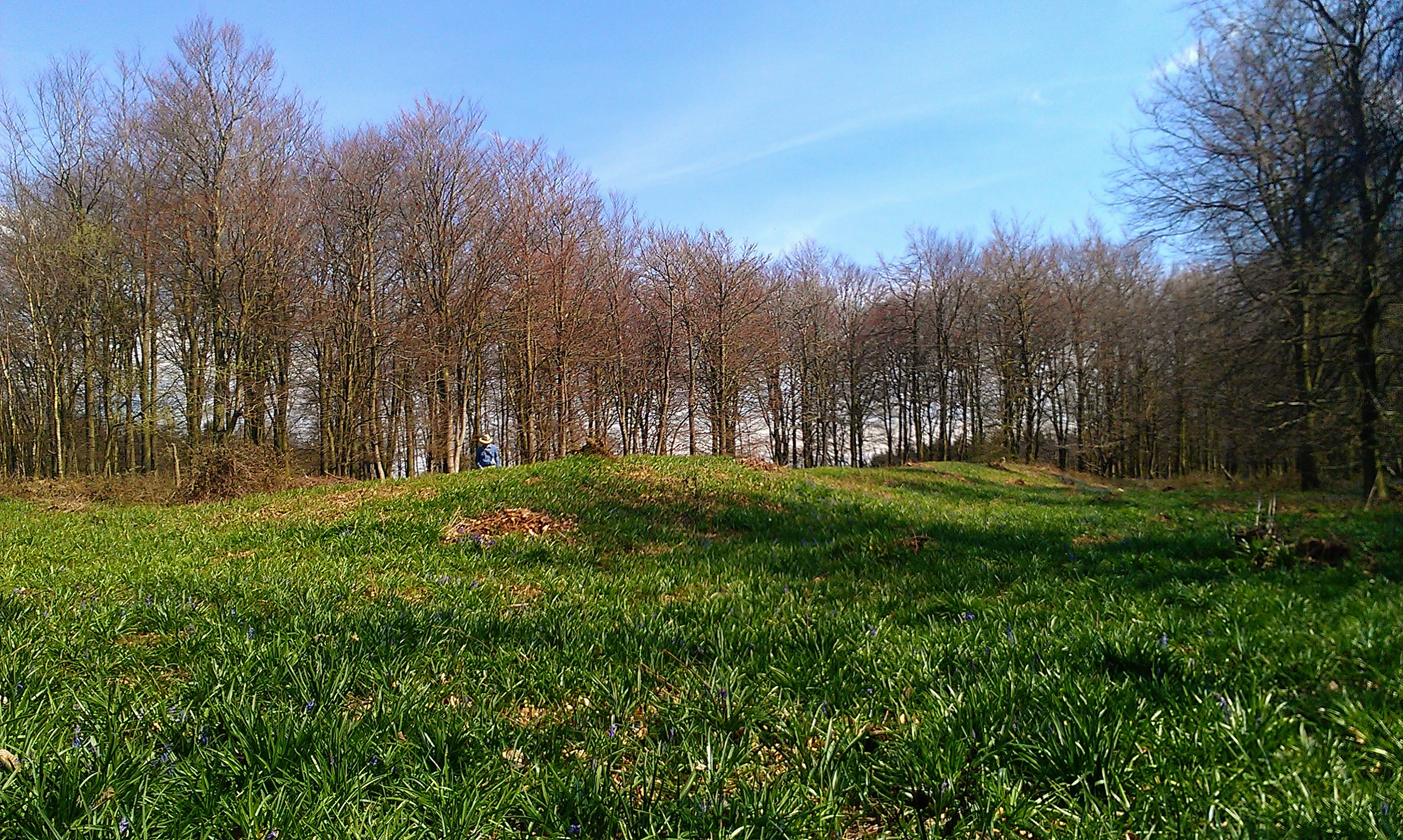
Jacket's Field long barrow, one of Julliberrie's Grave's fellow Stour barrows

In Britain, these tombs were typically located on prominent hills and slopes overlooking the surrounding landscape, perhaps at the junction between different territories. Archaeologist Caroline Malone noted that the tombs would have served as one of a variety of markers in the landscape that conveyed information on "territory, political allegiance, ownership, and ancestors." Many archaeologists have subscribed to the idea that these tomb-shrines served as territorial markers between different tribal groups, although others have argued that such markers would be of little use to a nomadic herding society. Instead it has been suggested that they represent markers along herding pathways. Many archaeologists have suggested that the construction of such monuments reflects an attempt to stamp control and ownership over the land, thus representing a change in mindset brought about by Neolithicisation. Others have suggested that these monuments were built on sites already deemed sacred by Mesolithic hunter-gatherers.

Archaeologists have differentiated these Early Neolithic tombs into a variety of different architectural styles, each typically associated with a different region within the British Isles. Passage graves, characterised by their narrow passage made of large stones and one or multiple burial chambers covered in earth or stone, were predominantly located in northern Britain and southern and central Ireland. Alternately, across northern Ireland and central Britain long chambered mounds predominated, while in the east and south-east of Britain, earthen long barrows represented the dominant architectural trend. These earthen long barrows were typically constructed of timber because building stone was scarce in southern Britain; archaeologist Aubrey Burl argued that these timber tombs might have been "even more eye-catching" than their stone counterparts, perhaps consisting of "towering carved poles, flamboyantly painted", but that evidence of such sculptures has not survived.

Archaeologists are aware of around twelve Neolithic long barrows that are located in Kent. The best known of these are the Medway Megaliths, all of which are found in the vicinity of the River Medway and each of which contains a stone burial chamber. This use of stone as a building material sets these Medway Megaliths apart from Julliberrie's Grave and the Stour long barrows. The decision by the builders of the Stour long barrows to not use stone was likely deliberate, for sarsens are naturally present in the local area and could have been obtained had they wanted them. Archaeologists recognise the Stour long barrows as a distinct regional grouping of this form of monument. The archaeologist Paul Ashbee thought that there was a typological link between Julliberrie's Grave and the long barrows on the chalk downlands of Sussex, despite the fact that they are over fifty miles apart from each other. The three tumuli are located within eight kilometres of each other, high up on the North Downs between Canterbury and Ashford. As of 1998, Julliberrie's Grave is the only one of the trio to have been archaeologically excavated.

== Design and construction ==
Trapezoidal in shape, Julliberrie's Grave is oriented on a north-northwest to south-southeast orientation. As of the mid-1930s, the barrow measured 43.9 metres (144 feet) in length, with a width of 14.6 metres (48 feet) at its northern end and 12.8 metres (42 feet) at its southern end. The tumulus measured 2.1 metres (7 feet) at its highest point. The long barrow was once larger than this; a letter written by an antiquarian in 1703 reported that the barrow was over 54.8 metres (180 feet) in length and over 12.1 metres (40 feet) in width at its widest section. A ditch encircled the southern end and sides of the tumulus and was not broken by any causeways. Whether this ditch also encircled the barrow's northern end is unknown due to the damage to that end of the monument. The inclusion of an encircling ditch without breaks in it is also seen in some of the long barrows found along Britain's southern coast, in Hampshire and Dorset.

No primary burials of human remains have been found in the barrow. This tumulus might therefore have been an example of a long barrow that did not contain a burial; several other empty examples are known. Conversely, it could have been that human remains were located in the northern end of the mound, which was later destroyed — likely by chalk quarrying — prior to any archaeological excavation. It is possible that the barrow's purpose was not funerary, perhaps instead serving as a territorial marker.

Julliberrie's Grave has not been firmly dated, and an understanding of its age relies upon circumstantial evidence. However, both its U-shaped plan and its lack of burials are representative of a later form in the European long barrow tradition. On the typological basis of a polished axe-head found within the barrow, the archaeologist Stuart Piggott suggested that the monument had been constructed at a late date within the Early Neolithic.

=== Deposits ===
Located well into the original turf-core of the southern end of the barrow was a broken polished stone-axe, discovered during the 1937 excavation of the site. Given both the high status prestige of such an item and its location deep inside the barrow, various archaeologists have deemed it likely that it had been deliberately deposited into the barrow as part of a ritual act. The inclusion of an axe within the monument is not unique to Julliberrie's Grave; elsewhere in Britain, axes have been found deposited inside other Early Neolithic monuments, including both long barrows and causewayed enclosures. Piggott highlighted that such polished axes have also been found in the long barrows of the Netherlands, furthermore highlighting that the style of the axe found within Julliberrie's Grave was akin to that found in the Netherlands, northern Germany, and Scandinavia, thereby suggesting a link between this part of Kent and those regions during the Early Neolithic. Ashbee suggested that the location of this axe reflects the existence of an axe cult that was present in both Kent and elsewhere during this period.

On the western side of the barrow, a rectangular pit had been dug which measured 4.7 metres (15.5 feet) from east to west and 2.3 metres (7.75) feet from north to south, as well as to a depth of at least 1.5 metres (5 feet) below the mound's surface. Its appearance suggested that care had been taken when both digging and filling it in; at its bottom was a deposit of lumpy chalk along with organic material that archaeologists in the 1930s could not identify, but which likely represented the item originally placed within the pit. Although no datable material was found within this pit, analysis of land mollusc shells recovered from both the top and the bottom of the pit suggested that it was broadly contemporary in date with the construction of the barrow itself. The archaeologist responsible for excavating this pit, Ronald Jessup, therefore suggested that the "burial pit" was "likely to postdate the mound only by a short period". He thought that it may have contained "a ritual offering made at the completion of the barrow".

=== Meaning and purpose ===
Britain's Early Neolithic communities placed greater emphasis on the ritual burial of the dead than their Mesolithic forebears. Archaeologists have suggested that this is because Early Neolithic Britons adhered to an ancestor cult that venerated the spirits of the dead, believing that they could intercede with the forces of nature for the benefit of their living descendants. The archaeologist Robin Holgate stressed that rather than simply being tombs, the Medway Megaliths were "communal monuments fulfilling a social function for the communities who built and used them". Thus, it has been suggested that Early Neolithic people entered into the tombs—which doubled as temples or shrines—to perform rituals honouring the dead and requesting their assistance. For this reason, the historian Ronald Hutton termed these monuments "tomb-shrines" to reflect their dual purpose.

In Britain, these tombs were typically located on prominent hills and slopes overlooking the landscape, perhaps at the junction between different territories. The archaeologist Caroline Malone noted that the tombs would have served as one of various landscape markers that conveyed information on "territory, political allegiance, ownership, and ancestors". Many archaeologists have subscribed to the idea that these tomb-shrines were territorial markers between different tribes; others have argued that such markers would be of little use to a nomadic herding society. Instead it has been suggested that they represent markers along herding pathways. The archaeologist Richard Bradley suggested that the construction of these monuments reflects an attempt to mark control and ownership over the land, thus reflecting a change in mindset brought about by the transition from the hunter-gatherer Mesolithic to the pastoralist Early Neolithic. Others have suggested that these monuments were built on sites already deemed sacred by Mesolithic hunter-gatherers.

== Subsequent history ==
=== Iron Age and Romano-British history ===
Archaeologists found evidence for activity at the site during the British Iron Age. In this period, a hearth was established in the barrow's western ditch. The remains of two pots were found alongside this hearth; one was made from "friable reddish-brown ware with large flint grits" and the other from "sandy, brown fabric, smoothed on the inside and with a fine flint tempering".

Romano-British finds are commonly located in and around Early Neolithic monuments, and at Julliberries' Grave there is evidence for what the archaeologist Paul Ashbee called "more than [a] casual Romano-British interest". Archaeologists found several Romano-British burials—both inhumations and cremations—just to the south of the long barrow. "Roman Burial I" was an inhumation of a child aged between 5 and 7, lain on its back with its feet to the northeast. It had been buried with a bronze brooch used to pin a shroud, as well as a bronze bracelet on its right arm and both a pottery dish and a cup by its head, all artefacts dated to the middle of the first century CE. "Roman Burial II" contained a female skeleton aged around 17 at the time of death. She was positioned on her back with her feet facing westward. Interred with the grave were a dish and a cup, both also dated to the middle of the first century CE. Between Burial I and II was an area of "greasy yellow chalk", which the excavators believed represented evidence for the burial of an infant. "Roman Burial III" contained six pottery vessels: a flagon, a butt-shaped beaker, two small cups, a dish, and a wide-mouthed bowl containing the cremated remains of a human cranium, as well as parts of the thorax and the long bones of a young adult. The bowl was placed atop six contiguous cervical vertebrae and a severed hand. The excavators believed that this was an early example of inhumation burial in Roman Britain, a practice that only became widespread in the third century CE.

A pot containing a hoard of Roman coins dating to the era of the Emperor Constantine was buried in the vicinity of the barrow; it was rediscovered in the nineteenth century. During the 1930s excavations, eight Roman coins of late fourth-century date were found below the turf at the southern end of the barrow – perhaps having been dropped from the hoard when it was discovered – while a Roman coin dating from the reign of the Emperor Magnus Maximus was found in ploughsoil. On the monument's south-eastern side had been a Romano-British hearth, which subsequently was used to deposit animal bones, oyster shells, a fragment of a glass cup, and pieces of pottery—including a piece of Samian ware—most of which dated to the first century CE. This had been topped by several large chalk flints. Excavators interpreted this as "a rubbish dump", with the stones perhaps having come from a collapsed memorial cairn associated with the nearby burials. Excavation on the site's northwest corner also revealed worn sherds of Romano-British pottery, including a piece from a second-century Samian ware cup, located 15.2 cm (six inches) below the surface of the turf. Romano-British pottery sherds were also found in the upper level of the ditch around the barrow.

The Romano-British burial of individuals around prehistoric barrows is not unique to Julliberrie's Grave and can be seen at other sites; for example, broadly contemporary with these burials were the cremation interments placed around a round barrow near Pakenham in Suffolk, Eastern England. The archaeologist Howard Williams noted that the Romano-British use of such prehistoric monuments could have been because, at the time, they were regarded "as the embodiment of local deities, ancestors and group identity". He added that they "could have provided an important role in the construction and negotiation of social identities and power relations in Romano-British society, alternative to those resources and ideologies provided by the Roman state."

=== Damage and dilapidation ===
Jessup believed that at some point in the barrow's history, an encroaching chalk pit destroyed its northern end; by the mid-1930s, it was reported that this pit has "not been worked for the past century" and had been stabilised by the growth of vegetation, which was preventing any further erosion. Conversely, Ashbee suggested that this damage might have been caused by a river meander gradually eroding that end. The northern end of the tumulus has also faced some damage from wastage, a result of rain water repeatedly dripping onto it from overhanging trees. Along part of the barrow's western side, ploughing has damaged the tumulus.

=== Etymology, folklore, and literature ===
By the early decades of the twentieth century, the archaeological site had come to be known as "Julliberrie's", "The Grave", and "The Giant's Grave" among residents of the local area. The -berrie element of the site's name may have derived from the Old English word beorg or beorge, meaning artificial mound or hill. The Julli- element might have derived from an individual's name or might be a reference to jewels, items which locals could have thought were present inside the barrow. In his study of Kentish place names, the etymologist J. K. Wallenberg suggested that the name "Julliberrie's Grave" may have emerged from antiquarian speculation.

During the 1930s, the idea that the barrow marked the grave of a giant was still present among the local population. Another tale recorded at the time was that the tumulus marked the burial place of one hundred horses and one hundred men who had been killed in battle but who could not be fitted into the graveyard of Chilham Church. Also in this period, a local man named Mr Read, who lived in the neighbouring mill, said that his father had forbidden him from climbing the mound, because it would be disrespectful to stand upon a grave.

Julliberrie's Grave also appears in R. Austin Freeman's 1936 novel The Penrose Mystery.

== Antiquarian and archaeological investigation ==
=== Antiquarian descriptions and investigations ===
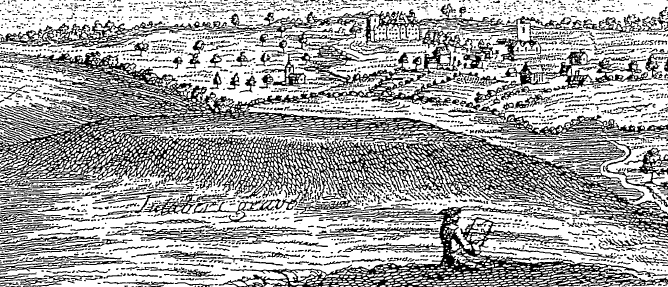
William Stukeley's drawing of Julliberrie's Grave from October 1722; the image was titled "Caesars Passage of the Stour by Chilham and Julabers Grave" and features a possible self-depiction of Stukeley within the image itself.

Unlike the other two Stour long barrows, the existence of Julliberrie's Grave has been known for many centuries. In the writings of the antiquarian William Camden, Julliberrie's Grave is presented as the burial place of Julius Laberius, one of the tribunes of the Roman general Julius Caesar, who Camden alleged died fighting the Iron Age Britons in 54 BCE during the second of Caesar's invasions of Britain. According to Camden:

Below this town [Chilham], is a green barrow, said to be the burying-place of one Jul-Laber many ages since; who, some will tell you, was a Giant, others a Witch. For my own part, imagining all along that there might be something of real Antiquity couch'd under that name, I am almost perswaded [sic] that Laberius Durus the Tribune, slain by the Britains [sic]... was buried here; and that from him the Barrow was call'd Jul-Laber.

Camden's ideas were largely accepted by later antiquarian commentators on the site, among them William Lambarde in his 1576 Perambulation of Kent, Richard Kilburne in his 1650 A Topographie of Kent, and Thomas Philipott in this 1659 Villare Cantianum. The account would also influence William Gostling, who in various editions of his Walk in and About the City of Canterbury—published between 1774 and 1825—included the long barrow on a map, where he labelled it "Jullaber or Tomb of Laberius".

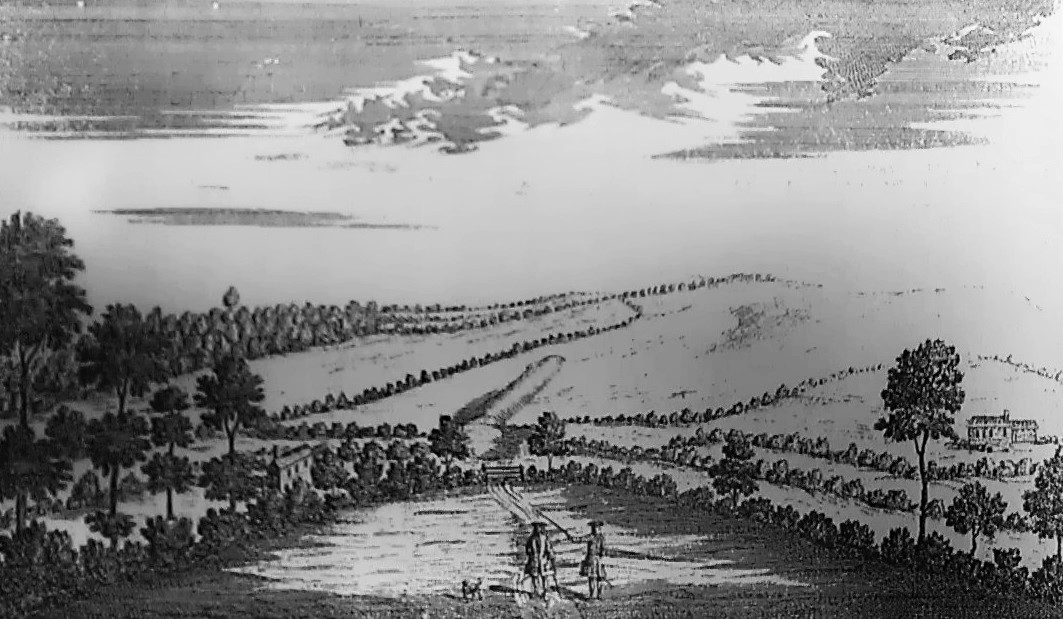
One of Stukeley's three engravings of the barrow, 1724. Julliberrie's Grave is in the centre of the image, situated within its 18th-century landscape context

Other prominent antiquarians also made visits to the site. The antiquarian John Aubrey visited in about 1671 when staying at Hothfield with his friend and patron, Nicholas Tufton, 3rd Earl of Thanet. Aubrey then made reference to the site in his unpublished document on British archaeology, Monumenta Britannica. In October 1722, the site was visited by the antiquarian William Stukeley, who made a drawing of the landscape around the long barrow; in October 1724, he returned to the site and produced a second sketch. In May 1725 he again visited Chilham and on this occasion produced Prospect of Julaber's Grave from Chilham, a drawing from the vantage point of the Woolpack Inn. This and other drawings were converted into engravings by Elisha Kirkall and featured in Stukeley's publications.

An excavation of the barrow was carried out by Lord Weymouth and Heneage Finch—later the 5th Earl of Winchelsea—in 1702 at the instigation of Thomas Thynne, 1st Viscount Weymouth, both of whom had antiquarian interests. Finch dug a shaft 1.5 metres (5 feet) in diameter through the middle of the mound and then expanded it into a 4.8 metre (16 foot) trench along the barrow's length. He found a few bones he regarded as non-human and described a chalk cap covering core of dark earth within the barrow. In a letter Finch wrote to John Battely, the Archdeacon of Canterbury, shortly after the excavation, he noted that: "that it has been a burial-place is manifest, but of what people or time I find no marks." It was later noted that this was one of the earliest organised "barrow openings" to take place in England. Later excavation in the 1930s found surface-evidence of a cross-trench in the heart of a barrow; this may be evidence for another, un-documented excavation that had taken place, perhaps conducted by a member of the Wildman family who owned the Chilham Castle estate between 1792 and 1861.

In the early nineteenth century, the site's owner set up a fence around the barrow to prevent trespassers walking onto it; this was gone by the mid-1930s. It was during the digging of a post hole for the fence that the hoard of Roman coins was discovered. Although the site had long been recognised as a tumulus, it was only in 1868 that it was first recognised as a long barrow, by the archaeologist John Thurnam. In 1880, the archaeologist Flinders Petrie recorded the site among a list of Kentish earthworks, referring to it as "Julaber's Grave". It was then examined and recorded by the archaeologist O. G. S. Crawford in his 1924 Ordnance Survey, Professional Papers.

=== Jessup's excavation ===
In July 1936, an excavation of the barrow was carried out under the directorship of the archaeologist Ronald Jessup. The excavation was both instigated and funded by the landowner who owned the barrow, Sir Edmund Davis, after the publication of Dr. R. Austin Freeman's novel, The Penrose Mystery (London: Hodder & Stouton, 1936) in which it plays a central role. After conducting this excavation, Jessup's team engaged in some conservation by filling in rabbit holes and removing thorn bushes that were damaging the barrow. In 1937, Davis paid for Jessup to run a second excavation at the site. This time lasting for eight weeks, the "primary object" of this excavation was to gain good dating evidence for the creation of the tumulus, something that had not been obtained in the 1936 excavation. The lithics discovered at the site were analysed by the archaeologist Grahame Clark, while the pottery was examined by his colleague, Stuart Piggott. Jessup's investigation confirmed Thurnam's view that the tumulus was a Neolithic long barrow, ascertained that the northern end had been destroyed, and revealed both the polished stone axe and the Romano-British burials.

Characterising Jessup's excavation as "careful, [and] comprehensive", Ashbee later related that it was one of "a small series of long barrow excavations carried out" during the 1930s which "were the valued precedents" of those carried out after the Second World War.
