= Jacket's Field Long Barrow =

Neolithic long barrow in Kent, England

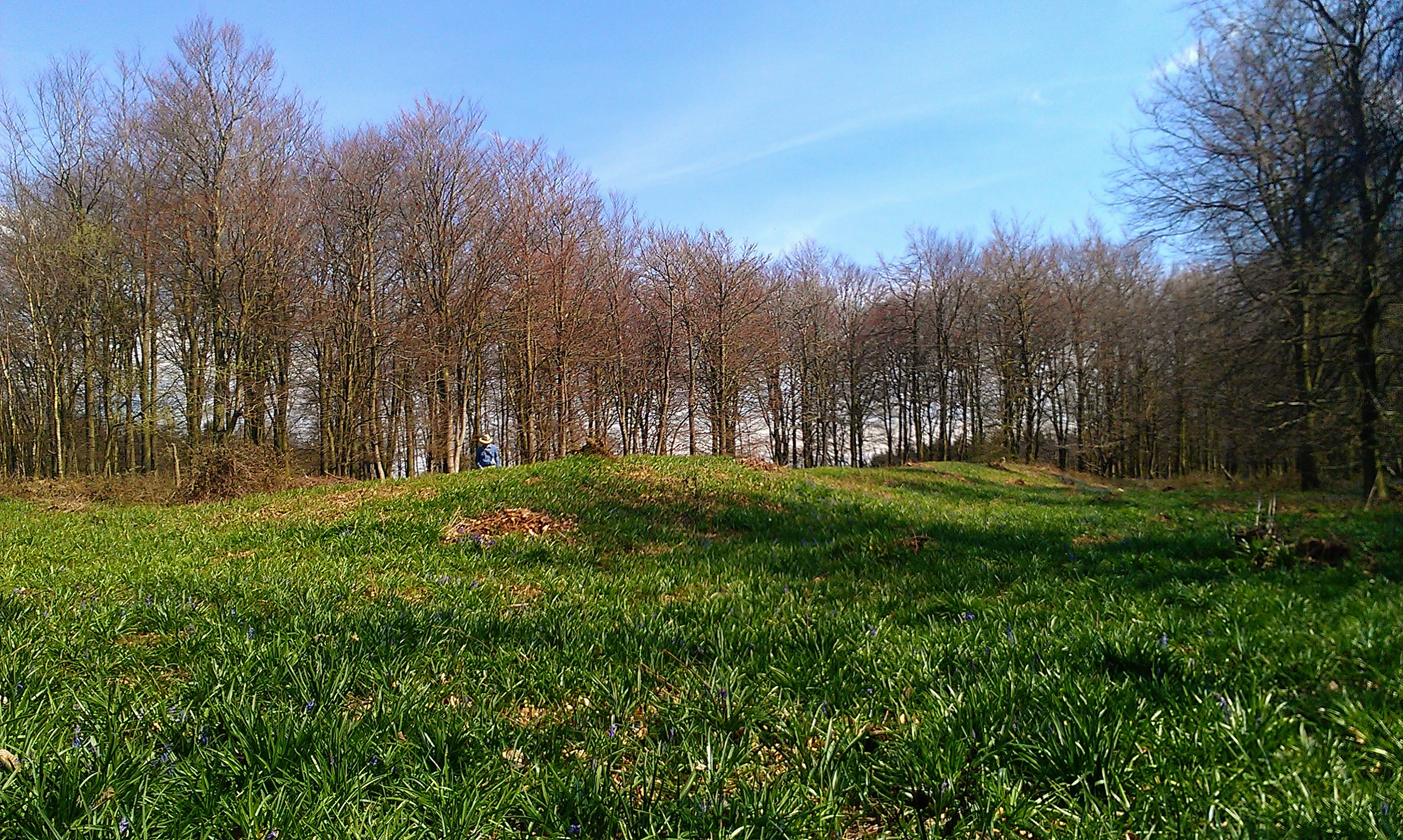
- Jacket's Field Long Barrow is located in a woodland clearing

- Location within Kent
- 51.209500°N 0.909193°E
- Type: Long barrow

History
- Built: Early Neolithic

Scheduled monument
- Designated: 1973
- Reference no.: 1013071

Jacket's Field Long Barrow is an unchambered long barrow located near to the village of Boughton Aluph in the south-eastern English county of Kent. It was probably constructed in the fourth millennium BCE, during Britain's Early Neolithic period. Built out of earth, the long barrow consists of a sub-trapezoidal tumulus flanked by side ditches.

Archaeologists have established that the monument was built by a pastoralist community shortly after the introduction of agriculture to Britain from continental Europe. Although representing part of an architectural tradition of long-barrow building that was widespread across Neolithic Europe, Jacket's Field Long Barrow belongs to a localised regional variant of barrows produced in the vicinity of the River Stour. Of these, it lies on the western side of the river, while Julliberrie's Grave and Shrub's Wood Long Barrow are found on the eastern side. The site was discovered in 1970, at which point it was concealed in dense woodland, although has yet to undergo thorough archaeological investigation.

== Location ==
Jacket's Field Long Barrow is found within woodland in Jacket's Field, north of the village of Boughton Aluph. It is located within the Soakham Downs on a subsoil of Clay-with-Flints. The North Downs trackway is located around 3 kilometres (1.9 mi) to the south-west of the barrow. It can be inspected from an adjacent public path.

== Context ==
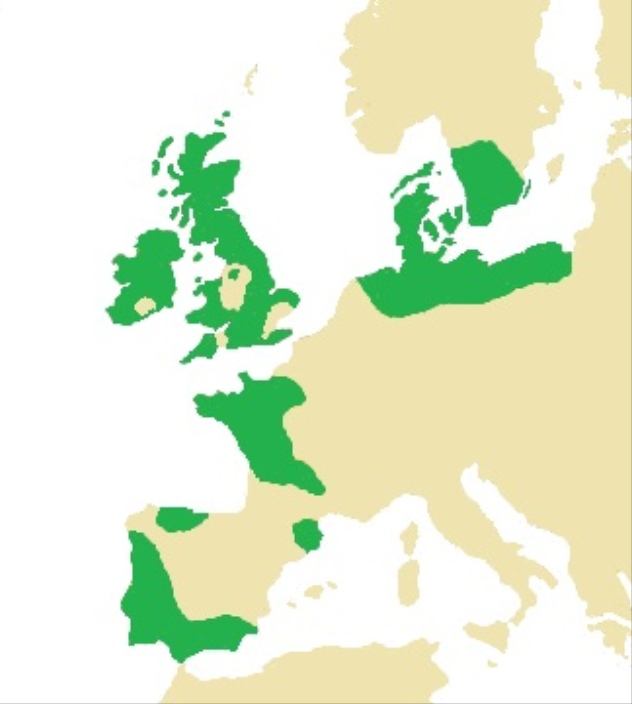
The construction of long barrows and related funerary monuments took place in various parts of Europe during the Early Neolithic (distribution pictured)

The Early Neolithic was a revolutionary period of British prehistory. Between 4500 and 3800 BCE, there was a widespread change in lifestyle as the communities living on the British Isles adopted agriculture as their primary form of subsistence, abandoning the hunter-gatherer lifestyle that had characterised the preceding Mesolithic period. This came about through contact with continental societies, although it is unclear to what extent this can be attributed to an influx of migrants or to indigenous Mesolithic Britons adopting agricultural technologies from the continent. The region of modern Kent would have been a key area for the arrival of continental European settlers and visitors, because of its position on the estuary of the River Thames and its proximity to the continent.

Britain was largely forested in this period; widespread forest clearance did not occur in the area around modern Kent until the Late Bronze Age (c.1000 to 700 BCE). Throughout most of Britain, there is little evidence of cereal or permanent dwellings from this period, leading archaeologists to believe that the Early Neolithic economy on the island was largely pastoral, relying on herding cattle, with people living a nomadic or semi-nomadic life. It is apparent that although a common material culture was shared throughout most of the British Isles in this period, there was great regional variation regarding the nature and distribution of settlement, architectural styles, and the use of natural resources.

=== Stour Long Barrows ===
Across Western Europe, the Early Neolithic marked the first period in which humans built monumental structures in the landscape. These were tombs that held the physical remains of the dead, and though sometimes constructed out of timber, many were built using large stones, now known as "megaliths". Individuals were rarely buried alone in the Early Neolithic, instead being interred in collective burials with other members of their community. The construction of these collective burial monumental tombs, both wooden and megalithic, began in continental Europe before being adopted in Britain in the first half of the fourth millennium BCE. Many archaeologists have suggested that this is evidence for an Early Neolithic ancestor cult revolving around veneration of the spirits of the dead. Given that other rites may have taken place around these long barrows, the historian Ronald Hutton termed them "tomb-shrines" to reflect their dual purpose.

In Britain, these long barrows were typically located on prominent hills and slopes overlooking the surrounding landscape, perhaps at the junction between different territories. The archaeologist Caroline Malone noted that the tombs would have served as one of a variety of markers in the landscape that conveyed information on "territory, political allegiance, ownership, and ancestors". Many archaeologists have subscribed to the idea that these tomb-shrines served as territorial markers between different tribal groups, although others have argued that such markers would be of little use to a nomadic herding society. Instead, it has been suggested that they were markers along herding pathways. Many archaeologists have suggested that the construction of such monuments reflects an attempt to stamp control and ownership over the land, thus representing a change in mindset brought about by Neolithicisation. Others have suggested that these monuments were built on sites already deemed sacred by Mesolithic hunter-gatherers.

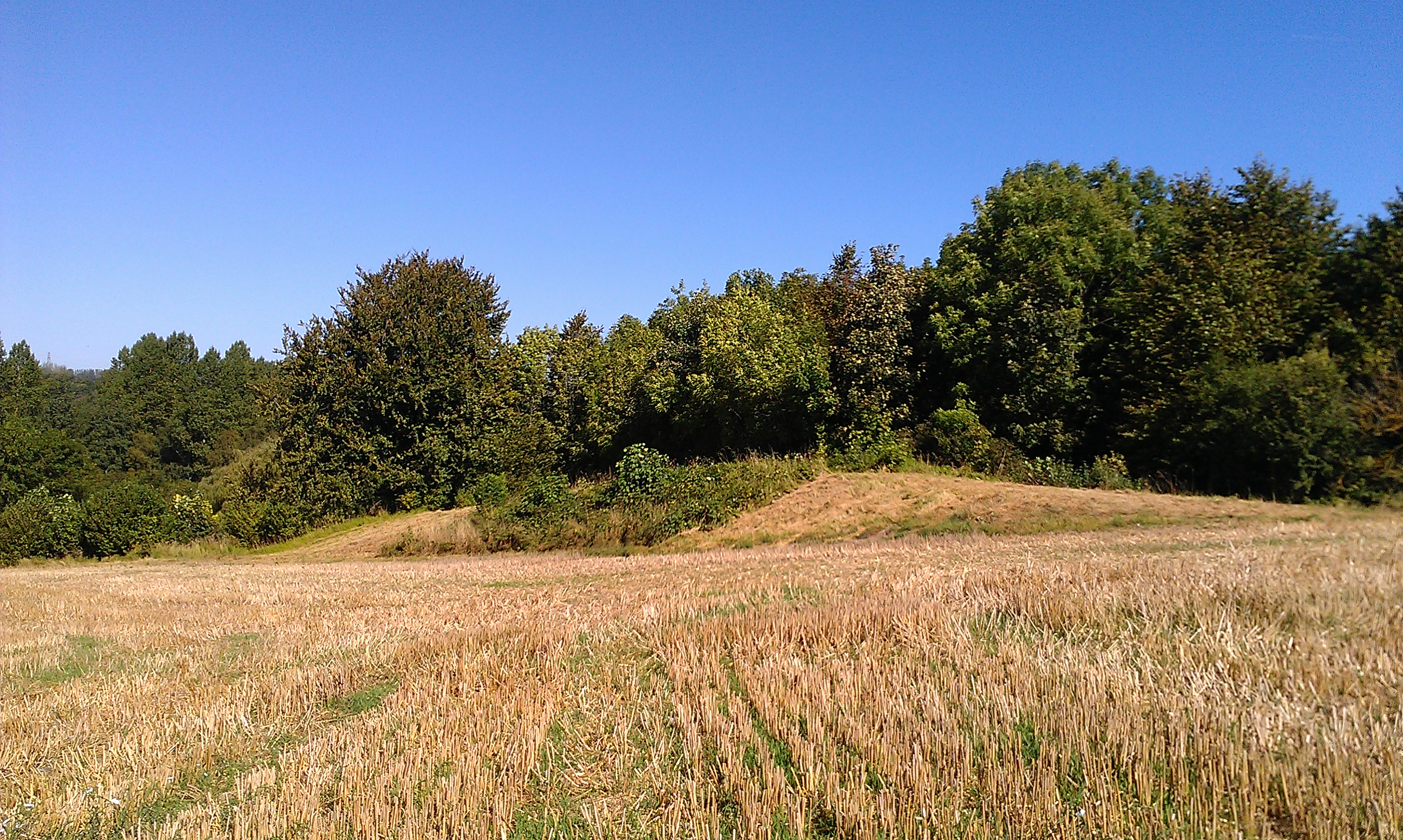
Juliberrie's Grave, one of the other two known Stour long barrows

Archaeologists are aware of around twelve Neolithic long barrows located in Kent. The best known are the Medway Megaliths found in the vicinity of the River Medway, each of which contains a stone burial chamber: the Coldrum Stones, Addington Long Barrow, Chestnuts Long Barrow, Kit's Coty House, Little Kit's Coty House, (the destroyed) Smythe's Megalith, and two other possible examples, the Coffin Stone and the White Horse Stone. About 38 kilometres (24 mi) east of the Medway Megaliths are the Stour long barrows. This distinct regional grouping consists of three known mounds: Jacket's Field Long Barrow, Julliberrie's Grave, and Shrub's Wood Long Barrow. These are located within 8 kilometres (5.0 mi) of each other, high up on the North Downs between Canterbury and Ashford; Jacket's Field is on the western side of the River Stour and the other two on the eastern side. Unlike the Medway Megaliths, the Stour long barrows do not appear to have used stone as a building material. Their builders' decision not to do so was likely deliberate, for sarsens are naturally present in the local area and could have been obtained had they wanted them.

The presence of the long barrows suggests some sort of settlement nearby in the Early Neolithic period, and two polished flint axes from the period have been found at Soakham Farm, not far from Jacket's Field Long Barrow. The North Downs trackway may have been in use at the time, and would have provided routes for local people to travel west. Elsewhere in southern Britain, long barrows were often erected close to causewayed enclosures, although none of the latter have yet been discovered near to the Stour long barrows. Elsewhere in the southeast, there are other long barrows of the period; over 75 kilometres (47 mi) away from the Stour long barrows are another regional cluster in Sussex, while a solitary long barrow is known at Badshot Farm in Farnham, Surrey.

== Description ==
Jacket's Field Long Barrow is "slightly trapezoidal" in shape. It aligns on an east/southeast to west/southwest axis. It measures approximately 70 metres (230 ft) in length, with a width of 12 metres (39 ft) at its eastern end and 10 metres (33 ft) at the west. At its western end, it reaches 1 metre (3 ft 3 in) in height, and at the eastern end almost 2 metres (6 ft 7 in). There is evidence of side ditches that once flanked the mound.

== Discovery ==
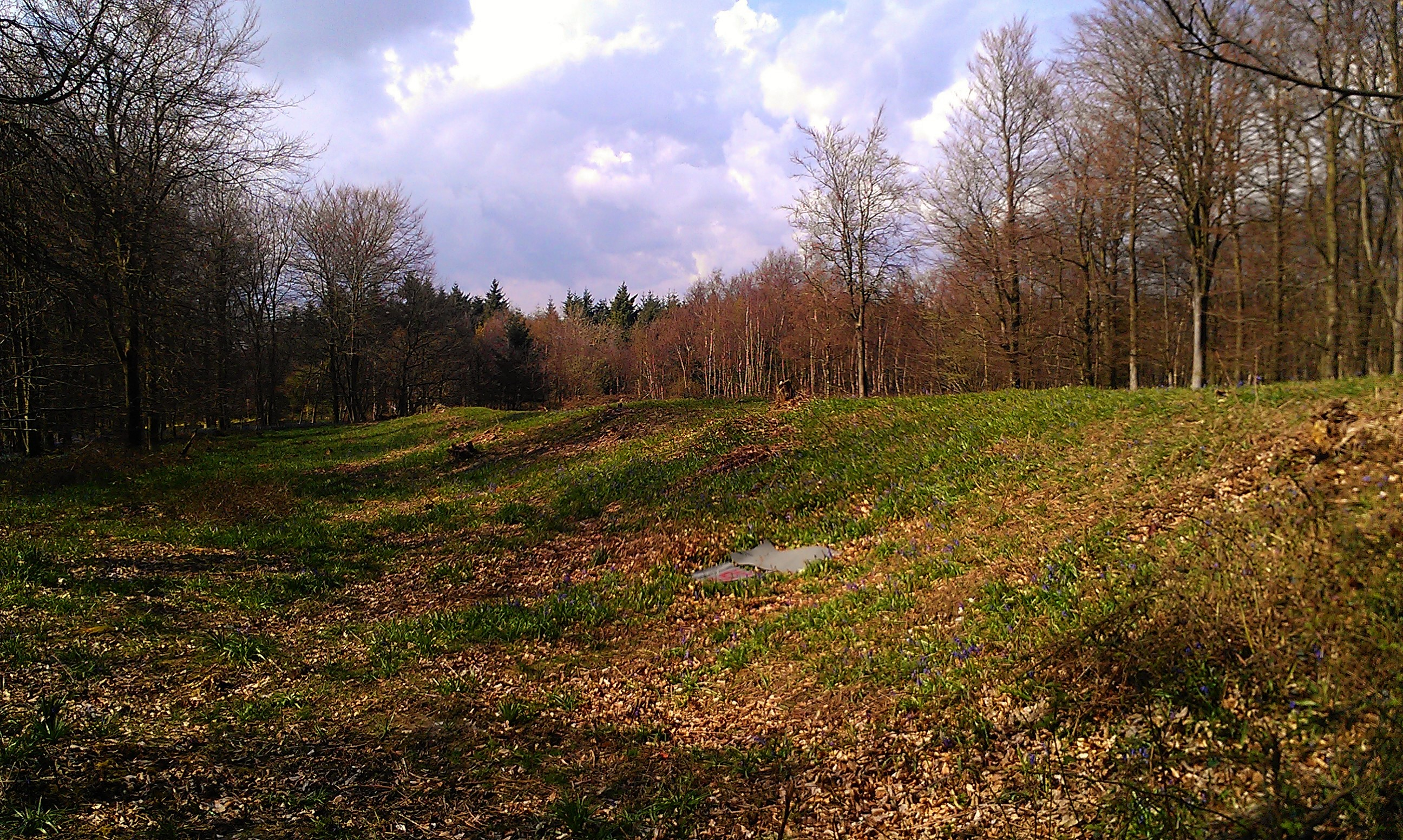
Jacket's Field barrow

While Julliberrie's Grave had been known to antiquarians since at least the 16th century, Jacket's Field Long Barrow—as well as Shrub's Wood Long Barrow—was only discovered by later archaeological investigation. The archaeologist Ronald Jessup, who excavated Julliberrie's Grave in the 1930s, suggested the likelihood that other long barrows would also be found in the area. In 1970, J. Bradshaw reported in the Archaeologia Cantiana, the journal of the Kent Archaeological Society, that Jacket's Field Long Barrow had been discovered within dense woodland and reported to the Ordnance Survey archaeological team, who investigated and confirmed its existence. It was subsequently made a scheduled monument.

As of 2007, neither Jacket's Field nor Shrub's Wood had undergone archaeological excavation.
